= List of Japanese naval commanders =

This is a list of Japanese naval commanders. Rank is assumed to be admiral unless stated otherwise.

== Post-Restoration War ==
- [Gombei] Yamamoto Gonnohyōe (1852–1933)
- Ijuin Gorō (1852–1921)
- Kawamura Sumiyoshi [Jungi] (1836–1904)
- Nakamuta Kuranosuke (1837–1916)
- Itō Sukemaro (1834–1906)
- Enomoto Takeaki (1836–1908)

== Sino-Japanese War ==
- Tsuboi Kōzō [Hara Kōzō] (1843–1898)
- Hidaka Sonojo (1848–1932)
- Itō Sukeyuki (1843–1914)
- Sakamoto Toshiatsu (1858–1941)
- Saigō Tsugumichi (1843–1902)

== Russo-Japanese War ==
- Koichi Fuiji (1858–1926)
- Shimamura Hayao (1858–1923)
- Tōgō Heihachirō (1848–1934)
- Kamimura Hikonojō (1849–1916)
- Murakami Kakuichi (1862–1927)
- Kanji Kato (1870–1939)
- Akiyama Saneyuki (1868–1918)
- Dewa Shigetō (1856–1930)
- Kataoka Shichirō (1854–1920)
- Misu Sotarō (1855–1921)
- Uryū Sotokichi (1857–1937)
- Kabayama Sukenori (1837–1922)
- Matsumura Tatsuo (1868–1932)
- Nashiba Tokioki (1850–1924)
- Katō Tomosaburō (1861–1923)
- Shibayama Yahachi (1850–1924)
- Matsumoto Yawara (1860–c. 1925)

== World War I ==
- Tetsutaro Sato (1886–1942)
- Yamashita Gentarō (1863–1931)
- Yamaya Tanin (1866–1940)
- Yashiro Rokurō (1860–1930)
- Mitsumasa Yonai (1880–1948)

== World War II ==
- Hiroaki Abe (1889–1949)
- Masafumi Arima (1895–1944)
- Shigeru Fukudome (1891–1971)
- Boshirō Hosogaya (1888–1964)
- Matsuji Ijuin (1893–1944)
- Toshihira Inoguchi (1896–1944)
- Shigeyoshi Inoue (1889–1975)
- Seiichi Itō (1890–1945)
- Kakuji Kakuta (1890–1944)
- Mineichi Koga (1885–1944)
- Teruhisa Komatsu (1888–1970)
- Nobutake Kondō (1886–1953)
- Takeo Kurita (1889–1977)
- Kameto Kuroshima (1893–1965)
- Jinichi Kusaka (1889–1972)
- Ryūnosuke Kusaka (1892–1971)
- Gunichi Mikawa (1888–1981)
- Osami Nagano (1880–1947)
- Chūichi Nagumo (1886–1944)
- Shōji Nishimura (1889–1944)
- Tomoshige Samejima (1889–1969)
- Satō Tetsutarō (1866–1942)
- Shigetarō Shimada (1883–1976)
- Kōichi Shiozawa (1881–1943)
- Kantarō Suzuki (1868–1948)
- Sōkichi Takagi (1893–1979)
- Takeo Takagi (1892–1944)
- Ibō Takahashi (1888–1947)
- Takarabe Takeshi (1867–1949)
- Sadatoshi Tomioka (1897–1970)
- Soemu Toyoda (1885–1957)
- Matome Ugaki (1890–1945)
- Tamon Yamaguchi (1892–1942)
- Isoroku Yamamoto (1884–1943)

== See also ==
- List of Imperial Japanese Navy admirals
