= 1st Fleet (Imperial Japanese Navy) =

IJN fleet (1903–1944)

- Active: 28 December 1903 – 25 February 1944
- Country: (Empire of Japan)
- Branch: Imperial Japanese Navy

Commanders
- Notable commanders: Heihachiro Togo; Kōichi Fujii; Osami Nagano; Isoroku Yamamoto; Chuichi Nagumo

The 1st Fleet (第一艦隊, Dai-ichi Kantai) was the main battleship fleet of the Imperial Japanese Navy.

== History ==
First established on 28 December 1903, the IJN 1st Fleet was created during the Russo-Japanese War when the Imperial General Headquarters divided the Readiness Fleet into a mobile strike force of cruisers and destroyers to pursue the Imperial Russian Navy's Vladivostok-based cruiser squadron (the Imperial Japanese Navy's 2nd Fleet), while the remaining bulk of the Japanese fleet (the IJN 1st Fleet) continued to blockade Port Arthur in hopes of luring the battleships of the Russian Pacific Fleet out into a classic line-of-battle confrontation. The two fleets were combined into the Combined Fleet for the final Battle of Tsushima. The decisive victory of the Japanese fleet over the Imperial Russian Navy at the Battle of Tsushima validated the doctrine of the "decisive victory", or kantai kessen as stipulated by naval theorists such as Alfred Thayer Mahan and Satō Tetsutarō in the eyes of the Imperial Japanese Navy General Staff, and future naval procurement and deployment was centered on refinements of this doctrine. The Mahanian objective was to build a fleet in being, a naval force kept deliberately in strategic reserve, as secondary forces based on cruisers and destroyers waged a campaign of attrition against an approaching enemy, who would then be destroyed in a climactic final battle similar to the Battle of Tsushima. As a result of this doctrine, although individual ships and task forces were dispatched on occasion for specific combat operations, the main force in the Imperial Japanese Navy was mostly held in reserve from the time of its inception until near the end of World War II.

== Commanders of the IJN 1st Fleet ==
	Commander-in-Chief	Dates		Previous Post	Next Post	Notes
1	Vice-Admiral; Tōgō Heihachirō 東郷平八郎	28 December 1903	20 December 1905	Commander-in-chief; Standing Fleet	Chairman; Navy General Staff	Promoted to Admiral 6 June 1904; Also Commander-in-Chief of the Combined Fleet for entire tenure.
2	Vice-Admiral; Kataoka Shichirō 片岡七郎	20 December 1905	22 November 1906	Commander-in-chief; 3rd Fleet	Director; Naval Shipping Bureau	
3	Vice-Admiral; Arima Shinichi 有馬新一	22 November 1906	26 May 1908			
4	Vice-Admiral; Ijūin Gorō 伊集院五郎	26 May 1908	1 December 1909	Commander-in-chief; 2nd Fleet	Chairman; Navy General Staff	Also Commander-in-Chief of the Combined Fleet from 8 October to 20 November 1908
5	Vice-Admiral; Kamimura Hikonojō 上村彦之丞	1 December 1909	1 December 1911	Commander-in-chief; Yokosuka Naval District	Naval Councilor	Promoted to Admiral
6	Vice-Admiral; Dewa Shigetō 出羽重遠	1 December 1911	1 December 1913	Commander-in-chief; Sasebo Naval District	Naval Councilor	Promoted to Admiral
7	Vice-Admiral; Katō Tomosaburō 加藤友三郎	1 December 1913	10 August 1915	Commander-in-chief; Sasebo Naval District	Minister of the Navy	
8	Vice-Admiral; Kōichi Fujii 藤井較一	10 August 1915	23 September 1915	Commander-in-chief; Sasebo Naval District	Commander-in-chief; Yokosuka Naval District	
9	Vice-Admiral; Shigetarō Yoshimatsu 吉松茂太郎	23 September 1915	1 December 1917	Commander-in-chief; Kure Naval District	Naval Councilor	Promoted to Admiral; Also Commander-in-Chief of the Combined Fleet; 8 October to 20 November 1915, 1 September to 14 October 1916, 1 to 22 October 1917
10	Vice-Admiral; Yamashita Gentarō 山下源太郎	1 December 1917	1 December 1919	Commander-in-chief; Sasebo Naval District	Naval Councilor	Promoted to Admiral; Also Commander-in-Chief of the Combined Fleet; 1 September to 15 October 1918, 1 June to 28 October 1919
11	Admiral; Yamaya Tanin 山屋他人	1 December 1919	24 August 1920	Commander-in-chief; 2nd Fleet	Commander-in-chief; Yokosuka Naval District	Also Commander-in-chief of the Combined Fleet from 1 May 1920
12	Admiral; Sōjirō Tochiuchi 栃内曽次郎	24 August 1920	27 July 1922	Vice-Minister of the Navy	Commander-in-chief; Sasebo Naval District	Also Commander-in-chief of the Combined Fleet until 31 October 1920 and from 1 May to 31 October 1921
13	Vice-Admiral; Takeshita Isamu 竹下勇	27 July 1922	27 January 1924		Commander-in-chief; Kure Naval District	Promoted to Admiral 3 August 1923; Also Commander-in-chief of the Combined Fleet from 1 December 1922; Command of Combined Fleet and 1st Fleet would be unified for the next 20 years.
14	Admiral; Suzuki Kantarō 鈴木貫太郎	27 January 1924	1 December 1924	Commander-in-chief; Kure Naval District	Naval Councilor	
15	Admiral; Okada Keisuke 岡田啓介	1 December 1924	10 December 1926	Naval Councilor	Commander-in-chief; Yokosuka Naval District	
16	Vice-Admiral; Katō Hiroharu 加藤寛治	10 December 1926	10 December 1928	Commander-in-chief; Yokosuka Naval District	Naval Councilor	Promoted to Admiral 1 April 1927
17	Admiral; Taniguchi Naomi 谷口尚真	10 December 1928	11 November 1929	Commander-in-chief; Kure Naval District	Commander-in-chief; Kure Naval District	
18	Vice-Admiral; Yamamoto Eisuke 山本英輔	11 November 1929	1 December 1931	Commander-in-chief; Yokosuka Naval District	Naval Councilor	Promoted to Admiral 1 March 1931
19	Vice-Admiral; Kobayashi Seizō 小林躋造	1 December 1931	15 November 1933	Vice-Minister of the Navy	Naval Councilor	Promoted to Admiral 1 April 1933
20	Vice-Admiral; Suetsugu Nobumasa 末次信正	15 November 1933	15 November 1934	Commander-in-chief; 2nd Fleet	Commander-in-chief; Yokosuka Naval District	Promoted to Admiral 30 March 1934
21	Vice-Admiral; Takahashi Sankichi 高橋三吉	15 November 1934	1 December 1936	Commander-in-chief; 2nd Fleet	Naval Councilor	Promoted to Admiral 1 April 1936
22	Vice-Admiral; Mitsumasa Yonai 米内光政	1 December 1936	2 February 1937	Commander-in-chief; Yokosuka Naval District	Minister of the Navy	
23	Admiral; Nagano Osami 永野修身	2 February 1937	1 December 1937	Minister of the Navy	Naval Councilor	
24	Vice-Admiral; Yoshida Zengo 吉田善吾	1 December 1937	30 August 1939	Commander-in-chief; 2nd Fleet	Minister of the Navy	
25	Vice-Admiral; Yamamoto Isoroku 山本五十六	30 August 1939	11 August 1941	Vice-Minister of the Navy	Commander-in-chief; Combined Fleet	Promoted to Admiral 15 November 1940; Command of Combined Fleet and 1st Fleet separated.
26	Vice Admiral; Takasu Shirō 高須四郎	11 August 1941	14 July 1942	Commander-in-chief; 4th Fleet	Attendant; Navy General Staff	
27	Vice-Admiral; Shimizu Mitsumi 清水光美	14 July 1942	20 October 1943			
28	Vice-Admiral; Nagumo Chūichi 南雲忠一	20 October 1943	25 February 1944	Commander-in-chief; Kure Naval District		

Chief of Staff

	Rank	Name	Date
1	Fleet Admiral	Baron Hayao Shimamura	28 December 1903 – 12 January 1905
2	Fleet Admiral	Viscount Tomosaburō Katō	12 January 1905 – 20 December 1905
3	Admiral	Kōichi Fujii	20 December 1905 – 22 November 1906
4	Fleet Admiral	Baron Yamashita Gentarō	22 November 1906 – 10 December 1908
5	Admiral	Takarabe Takeshi	10 December 1908 – 1 December 1909
6	Admiral	Kaneo Nomaguchi	1 December 1909 – 11 March 1911
7	Vice Admiral	Saneyuki Akiyama	11 March 1911 – 1 December 1912
8	Admiral	Isamu Takeshita	1 December 1912 – 24 May 1913
x		position vacant	24 May 1913 – 1 December 1913
9	Vice Admiral	Tetsutaro Sato	1 December 1913 – 17 April 1914
10	Vice Admiral	Kazuyoshi Yamaji	17 April 1914 – 1 December 1914
11	Vice Admiral	Shibakichi Yamanaka	1 December 1914 – 13 December 1915
12	Vice Admiral	Saburo Horiuchi	13 December 1915 – 1 December 1917
13	Vice Admiral	Hanroku Saito	1 December 1917 – 1 December 1918
14	Vice Admiral	Kajishiro Funakoshi	1 December 1918 – 1 December 1919
15	Vice Admiral	Hansaku Yoshioka	1 December 1919 – 1 December 1921
16	Vice Admiral	Kumazo Shirane	1 December 1921 – 1 December 1923
17	Rear Admiral	Bekinari Kabayama	1 December 1923 – 10 November 1924
18	Vice Admiral	Kanjiro Hara	10 November 1924 – 1 December 1925
19	Vice Admiral	Naotaro Ominato	1 December 1925 – 1 November 1926
20	Admiral	Sankichi Takahashi	1 November 1926 – 1 December 1927
21	Vice Admiral	Eijiro Hamano	1 December 1927 – 10 December 1928
22	Vice Admiral	Ken Terajima	10 December 1928 – 30 October 1929
23	Admiral	Koichi Shiozawa	30 October 1929 – 1 December 1930
24	Admiral	Shigetarō Shimada	1 December 1930 – 1 December 1931
25	Admiral	Zengo Yoshida	1 December 1931 – 15 September 1933
26	Admiral	Soemu Toyoda	15 September 1933 – 15 March 1935
27	Admiral	Nobutake Kondō	15 March 1935 – 15 November 1935
28	Admiral	Naokuni Nomura	15 November 1935 – 16 November 1936
29	Rear Admiral	Yasutaro Iwashita	16 November 1936 – 18 February 1937
30	Vice Admiral	Jisaburo Ozawa	18 February 1937 – 15 November 1937
31	Vice Admiral	Ibo Takahashi	15 November 1937 – 5 November 1939
32	Vice Admiral	Shigeru Fukudome	5 November 1939 – 10 April 1941
33	Admiral	Seiichi Ito	10 April 1941 – 11 August 1941
34	Vice Admiral	Kengo Kobayashi	11 August 1941 – 6 January 1943
35	Vice Admiral	Gihachi Takayanagi	6 January 1943 – 25 February 1944

== Books ==
- D'Albas, Andrieu (1965). Death of a Navy: Japanese Naval Action in World War II. Devin-Adair Pub. ISBN 0-8159-5302-X.
- Dull, Paul S. (1978). A Battle History of the Imperial Japanese Navy, 1941–1945. Naval Institute Press. ISBN 0-87021-097-1.
- Evans, David (1979). Kaigun: Strategy, Tactics, and Technology in the Imperial Japanese Navy, 1887–1941. US Naval Institute Press. ISBN 0-87021-192-7.
