= Combined Fleet =

Imperial Japanese Navy unit (1894–1945)

- 聯合艦隊 (Rengō Kantai)
- Rising Sun Flag
- Active: 1894–1945
- Country: Empire of Japan
- Allegiance: Emperor of Japan
- Branch: Imperial Japanese Navy
- Type: Sea-going component of the Imperial Japanese Navy
- Main Theatre: Pacific Ocean
- Wars: First Sino-Japanese War; Russo-Japanese War; World War I Second Sino-Japanese War; World War II

Commanders
- Commander-in-Chief: Itō Sukeyuki (first); Jisaburō Ozawa (last)

Insignia
- Identification symbol: Imperial Seal of Japan and Seal of the Imperial Japanese Navy

The Combined Fleet (聯合艦隊, Rengō Kantai) was the main sea-going component of the Imperial Japanese Navy. Until 1933, the Combined Fleet was not a permanent organization, but a temporary force formed for the duration of a conflict or major naval maneuvers from various units normally under separate commands in peacetime.

== History ==
=== Sino-Japanese War (1894–95) ===
The Combined Fleet was formally created for the first time on 18 July 1894 by the merger of the Standing Fleet and the Western Fleet. The Standing Fleet (also known as the Readiness Fleet) contained the navy's most modern and combat-capable warships. The Western Fleet was a reserve force consisting primarily of obsolete ships deemed unsuitable for front-line combat operations, but still suitable for commerce protection and coastal defense. Vice-admiral Itō Sukeyuki was appointed the first Commander-in-Chief of the Combined Fleet for the duration of the first Sino-Japanese War against China.

=== Russo-Japanese War (1904–05) ===
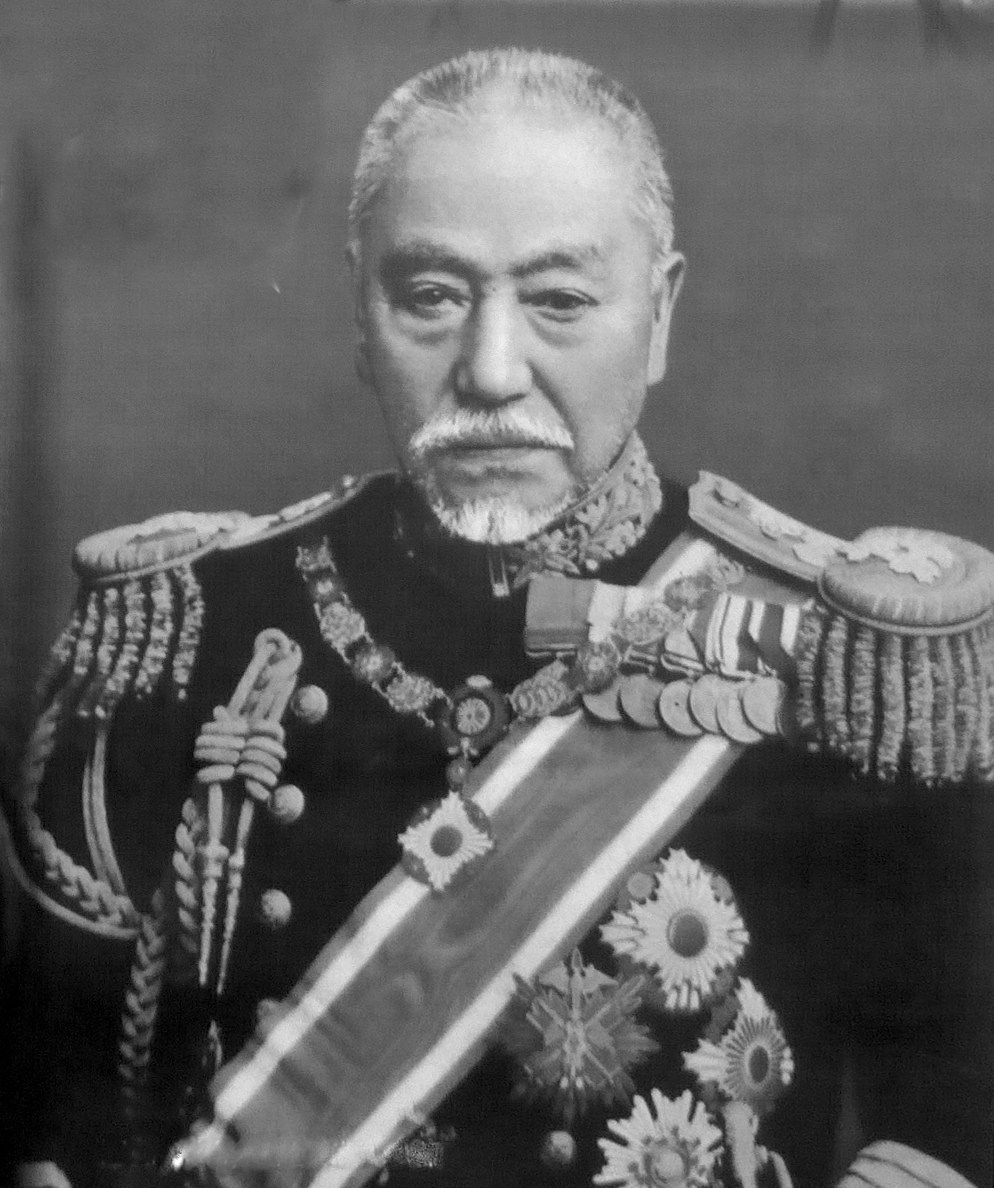
Admiral Tōgō Heihachirō, commander-in-chief of the Combined Fleet during the Russo-Japanese War.

The Combined Fleet was re-formed during the Russo-Japanese War of 1904–05 to provide a unified overall command for the three separate fleets in the Imperial Japanese Navy. The 1st Fleet was the main battleship force, which formed the backbone of the navy and was intended to be used in a traditional line of battle showdown with an equivalent enemy battleship fleet (Kantai Kessen). The 2nd Fleet was a fast, mobile strike force with armored cruisers and protected cruisers. The 3rd Fleet was primarily a reserve fleet of obsolete vessels considered too weak for front-line combat service, but which could still be used in the operation to blockade Port Arthur. Admiral Tōgō Heihachirō was commander-in-chief of the Combined Fleet during the Russo-Japanese War.

=== Interwar years ===
The Combined Fleet was not maintained as a permanent organization, but was temporarily created when necessary during fleet maneuvers or when called for by extraordinary circumstances. Thus, during the period from 1905 to 1924, the Combined Fleet was created only sporadically as the occasion or circumstances dictated, and disbanded immediately afterwards.

In 1924, the Imperial Japanese Navy declared in an edict on fleet organization that "for the time being" the Combined Fleet would be a standing organization consisting of the IJN 1st Fleet and IJN 2nd Fleet. As this was not intended to be "permanent" and since the commander of IJN 1st Fleet concurrently directed the Combined Fleet, the Combined Fleet was not given a Headquarters staff of its own.

From 1933, with the Mukden Incident and the increasing tension with China, a permanent HQ staff for the Combined Fleet was established. By the late 1930s, it included most of Japan's warships—only the base units, the Special Naval Landing Forces, and the China Area Fleet lay outside the Combined Fleet.

=== World War II ===
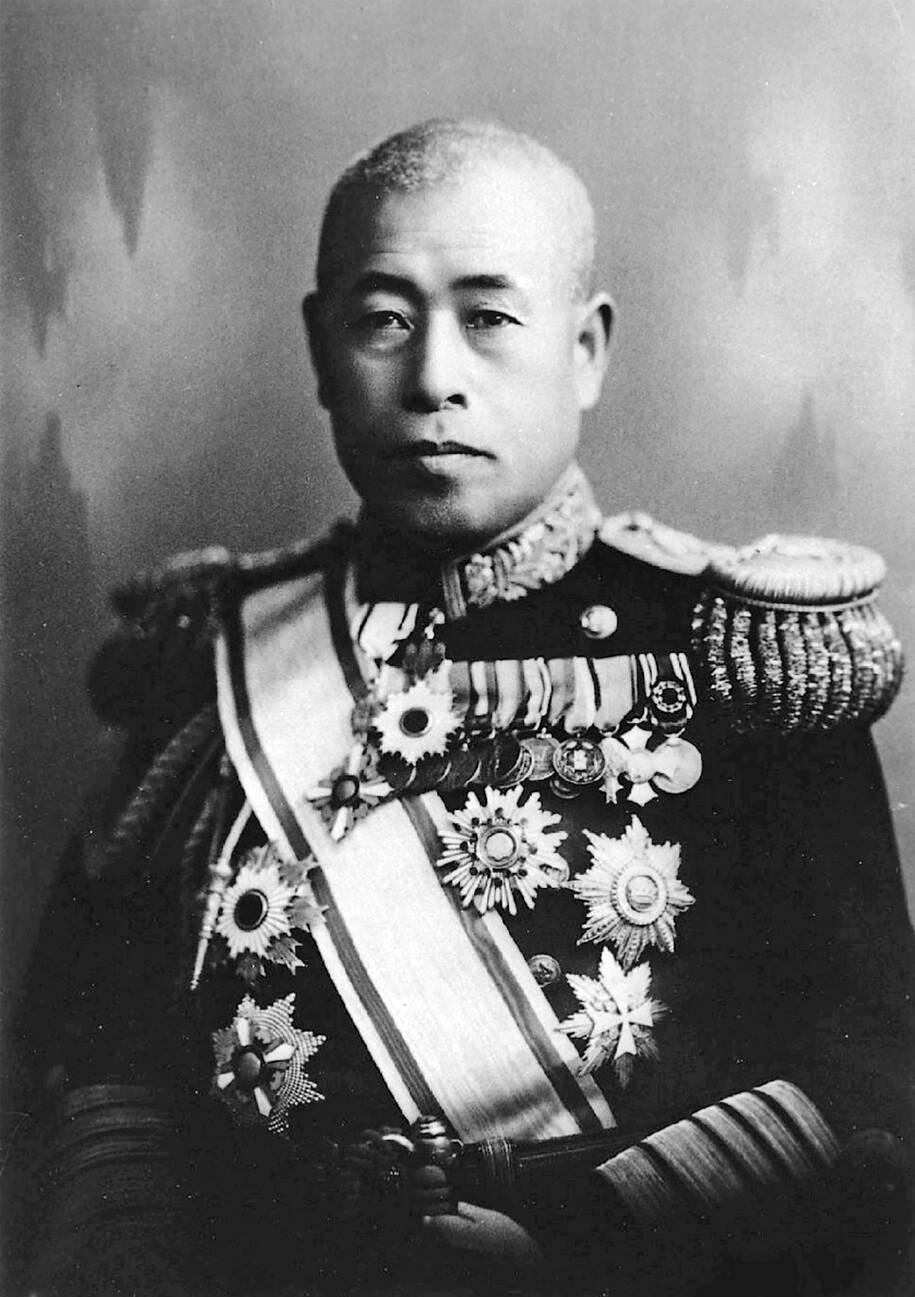
Admiral Isoroku Yamamoto, commander-in-chief of the Combined Fleet during the early stage of the Pacific War.

The Combined Fleet came under direct command of the Imperial General Headquarters in 1937. With the start of the Pacific War with the attack on Pearl Harbor carried out by Combined Fleet's Kido Butai (1st Air Fleet), the Combined Fleet became almost synonymous with the Imperial Japanese Navy, under the command of Admiral Isoroku Yamamoto till April 1943 when he died after Operation Vengeance when his aircraft was shot-down by the US Army Air Forces over Bougainville Island. It comprised the battleships, aircraft carriers, aircraft, and the components that made up the main fighting strength of the IJN. It was first mobilized on the whole for the Battle of Midway. After the devastating carrier losses at Midway and in the Solomon Islands campaign, the navy re-organized into a number of "Area Fleets" for local operational control of various geographic zones. The Combined Fleet then evolved into more of an administrative organization.

As the war situation deteriorated for the Japanese and the territories controlled by the "Area Fleets" fell one after another to the United States Navy, the Imperial General Headquarters and the Imperial Japanese Navy General Staff acted to force the American fleet into a "decisive battle" in the Philippines per the Kantai Kessen philosophy. In the resultant Battle of the Philippine Sea and the Battle of Leyte Gulf the Japanese fleet was severely depleted. The remnants of the Combined Fleet fled to Okinawa, but further operations were hindered by lack of fuel and air cover. By the time of the final suicide mission of the battleship Yamato in Operation Ten-Go, the Combined Fleet had ceased to exist as an effective combat force.

== Commander-in-Chief (司令長官, Shireichōkan) ==
No.	Portrait	Commander-in-Chief	Took office	Left office	Time in office
1	Itō Sukeyuki伊藤祐亨	Vice Admiral; Itō Sukeyuki 伊藤祐亨 (1843–1914)	18 July 1894	11 May 1895	297 days
2	Arichi Shinanojō有地品之允	Vice Admiral; Arichi Shinanojō (Note: Created Baron on 5 June 1896.) 有地品之允 (1843–1919)	11 May 1895	16 November 1895 (Note: Forced into retirement on 21 October 1895 for boarding neutral vessels in search of Liu Yongfu, the fugitive president of the Republic of Formosa; Fleet dissolved.)	189 days
3	Tōgō Heihachirō東郷平八郎	Vice Admiral (when appointed); Admiral (from 6 June 1904); Tōgō Heihachirō 東郷平八郎 (1848–1934)	28 December 1903	20 December 1905 (Note: Fleet dissolved.)	1 year, 357 days
4	Baron Ijūin Gorō伊集院五郎	Vice Admiral; Baron Ijūin Gorō 伊集院五郎 (1852–1921)	8 October 1908	20 November 1908	43 days
5	Yoshimatsu Shigetarō [ja]吉松茂太郎	Vice Admiral; Yoshimatsu Shigetarō 吉松茂太郎 (1859–1935)	1 November 1915	13 December 1915	42 days
(5)	Yoshimatsu Shigetarō [ja]吉松茂太郎	Vice Admiral; Yoshimatsu Shigetarō 吉松茂太郎 (1859–1935)	1 September 1916	14 October 1916	43 days
(5)	Yoshimatsu Shigetarō [ja]吉松茂太郎	Admiral; Yoshimatsu Shigetarō 吉松茂太郎 (1859–1935)	1 October 1917	22 October 1917	21 days
6	Yamashita Gentarō山下源太郎	Admiral; Yamashita Gentarō 山下源太郎 (1863–1931)	1 September 1918	15 October 1918	44 days
(6)	Yamashita Gentarō山下源太郎	Admiral; Yamashita Gentarō 山下源太郎 (1863–1931)	1 June 1919	28 October 1919	149 days
7	Yamaya Tanin山屋他人	Admiral; Yamaya Tanin 山屋他人 (1866–1940)	1 May 1920	24 August 1920	115 days
8	Tochinai Sojirō [ja]栃内曽次郎	Admiral; Tochinai Sojirō 栃内曽次郎 (1866–1932)	24 August 1920	31 October 1920	68 days
(8)	Tochinai Sojirō [ja]栃内曽次郎	Admiral; Tochinai Sojirō 栃内曽次郎 (1866–1932)	1 May 1921	31 October 1921	183 days
9	Takeshita Isamu竹下勇	Vice Admiral (when appointed); Admiral (from 3 August 1923); Takeshita Isamu 竹下勇 (1870–1949)	1 December 1922 (Note: Fleet recreated as permanent entity; given direct command over 1st Fleet.)	27 January 1924	1 year, 57 days
10	Kantarō Suzuki鈴木貫太郎	Admiral; Kantarō Suzuki 鈴木貫太郎 (1868–1948)	27 January 1924	1 December 1924	309 days
11	Okada Keisuke岡田啓介	Admiral; Okada Keisuke 岡田啓介 (1868–1952)	1 December 1924	10 December 1926	2 years, 9 days
12	Katō Hiroharu加藤寛治	Vice Admiral (when appointed); Admiral (from 1 April 1927); Katō Hiroharu 加藤寛治 (1870–1939)	10 December 1926	10 December 1928	2 years
13	Taniguchi Naomi [ja]谷口尚真	Admiral; Taniguchi Naomi 谷口尚真 (1870–1941)	10 December 1928	11 November 1929	336 days
14	Yamamoto Eisuke [ja]山本英輔	Vice Admiral (when appointed); Admiral (from 1 March 1931); Yamamoto Eisuke 山本英輔 (1876–1962)	11 November 1929	1 December 1931	2 years, 20 days
15	Kobayashi Seizō小林躋造	Vice Admiral (when appointed); Admiral (from 1 April 1933); Kobayashi Seizō 小林躋造 (1877–1962)	1 December 1931	15 November 1933	1 year, 349 days
16	Suetsugu Nobumasa末次信正	Vice Admiral (when appointed); Admiral (from 30 March 1934); Suetsugu Nobumasa 末次信正 (1880–1944)	15 November 1933	15 November 1934	1 year
17	Takahashi Sankichi高橋三吉	Vice Admiral (when appointed); Admiral (from 1 April 1936); Takahashi Sankichi 高橋三吉 (1882–1966)	15 November 1934	1 December 1936	2 years, 16 days
18	Yonai Mitsumasa米内光政	Vice Admiral; Yonai Mitsumasa 米内光政 (1880–1948)	1 December 1936	2 February 1937	63 days
19	Nagano Osami永野修身	Admiral; Nagano Osami 永野修身 (1880–1947)	2 February 1937	1 December 1937	302 days
20	Yoshida Zengo吉田善吾	Vice Admiral; Yoshida Zengo 吉田善吾 (1885–1966)	1 December 1937	30 August 1939	1 year, 272 days
21	Yamamoto Isoroku山本五十六	Vice Admiral (when appointed); Admiral (from 15 November 1940) (Note: Promoted posthumously to Marshal Admiral.); Yamamoto Isoroku 山本五十六 (1884–1943)	30 August 1939	18 April 1943 (Note: 1st Fleet separated from direct command on 11 August 1941.) †	3 years, 231 days
22	Koga Mine'ichi古賀峯一	Admiral (Note: Promoted posthumously to Marshal Admiral.); Koga Mine'ichi 古賀峯一 (1885–1944)	21 May 1943	31 March 1944 (Note: Killed in action when Kawanishi H8K ("Emily") flying boat crashed during a typhoon between Palau and Davao.) †	315 days
23	Toyoda Soemu豊田副武	Admiral; Toyoda Soemu 豊田副武 (1885–1957)	3 May 1944	29 May 1945	1 year, 26 days
24	Ozawa Jisaburō小沢治三郎	Vice Admiral (Note: Refused promotion to Admiral.); Ozawa Jisaburō 小沢治三郎 (1886–1966)	29 May 1945	10 October 1945 (Note: Fleet surrendered.)	134 days

== Chief of Staff (参謀長, Sanbōchō) ==
No.	Portrait	Chief of Staff	Took office	Left office	Time in office
1	Samejima Kazunori鮫島員規	Captain; Samejima Kazunori 鮫島員規 (1845–1910)	19 July 1894	17 December 1894	151 days
2	Dewa Shigetō出羽重遠	Captain; Dewa Shigetō 出羽重遠 (1856–1930)	17 December 1894	25 July 1895	220 days
3	Kamimura Hikonojō上村彦之丞	Captain; Kamimura Hikonojō 上村彦之丞 (1849–1916)	25 July 1895	16 November 1895	114 days
4	Shimamura Hayao島村速雄	Captain; Shimamura Hayao 島村速雄 (1858–1923)	28 December 1903	12 January 1905	1 year, 15 days
5	Katō Tomosaburō加藤友三郎	Rear Admiral; Katō Tomosaburō 加藤友三郎 (1861–1923)	12 January 1905	20 December 1905	342 days
6	Yamashita Gentarō山下源太郎	Captain; Yamashita Gentarō 山下源太郎 (1863–1931)	8 October 1908	20 November 1908	43 days
7	Yamanaka Shibakichi [ja]山中柴吉	Rear Admiral; Yamanaka Shibakichi 山中柴吉 (1870–1941)	1 November 1915	13 December 1915	42 days
8	Horiuchi Saburō [ja]堀内三郎	Vice Admiral; Horiuchi Saburō 堀内三郎 (1869–1933)	1 September 1916	14 October 1916	43 days
(8)	Horiuchi Saburō [ja]堀内三郎	Vice Admiral; Horiuchi Saburō 堀内三郎 (1869–1933)	1 October 1917	22 October 1917	21 days
9	Saitō Hanroku [ja]斎藤半六	Rear Admiral; Saitō Hanroku 斎藤半六 (1869–1952)	1 September 1918	15 October 1918	44 days
10	Funakoshi Kajishirō [ja]舟越楫四郎	Rear Admiral; Funakoshi Kajishirō 舟越楫四郎 (1870–1962)	1 June 1919	28 October 1919	149 days
11	Yoshioka Hansaku吉岡範策	Rear Admiral; Yoshioka Hansaku 吉岡範策 (1869–1930)	1 May 1920	31 October 1920	183 days
(11)	Yoshioka Hansaku吉岡範策	Rear Admiral; Yoshioka Hansaku 吉岡範策 (1869–1930)	1 May 1921	31 October 1921	183 days
12	Shirane Kumazō [ja]白根熊三	Rear Admiral; Shirane Kumazō 白根熊三 (1876–1939)	1 December 1922	1 December 1923	1 year
13	Kabayama Kanari [ja]樺山可也	Rear Admiral; Kabayama Kanari 樺山可也 (1876–1932)	1 December 1923	10 November 1924	345 days
14	Hara Kanjirō [ja]原敢二郎	Captain (when appointed); Rear Admiral (from 1 December 1924); Hara Kanjirō 原敢二郎 (1880–1948)	10 November 1924	1 December 1925	1 year, 21 days
15	Ōminato Naotarō [ja]大湊直太郎	Rear Admiral; Ōminato Naotarō 大湊直太郎 (1879–1958)	1 December 1925	1 November 1926	335 days
16	Takahashi Sankichi高橋三吉	Rear Admiral; Takahashi Sankichi 高橋三吉 (1882–1966)	1 November 1926	1 December 1927	1 year, 30 days
17	Hamano Eijirō [ja]濱野英次郎	Rear Admiral; Hamano Eijirō 濱野英次郎 (1880–1952)	1 December 1927	10 December 1928	1 year, 9 days
18	Terajima Ken寺島健	Rear Admiral; Terajima Ken 寺島健 (1882–1972)	10 December 1928	30 October 1929	324 days
19	Shiozawa Kōichi塩沢幸一	Rear Admiral; Shiozawa Kōichi 塩沢幸一 (1881–1943)	30 October 1929	1 December 1930	1 year, 32 days
20	Shimada Shigetarō嶋田繁太郎	Rear Admiral; Shimada Shigetarō 嶋田繁太郎 (1883–1976)	1 December 1930	1 December 1931	1 year
21	Yoshida Zengo吉田善吾	Rear Admiral; Yoshida Zengo 吉田善吾 (1885–1966)	1 December 1931	15 September 1933	1 year, 288 days
22	Toyoda Soemu豊田副武	Rear Admiral; Toyoda Soemu 豊田副武 (1885–1957)	15 September 1933	15 March 1935	1 year, 181 days
23	Kondō Nobutake近藤信竹	Rear Admiral; Kondō Nobutake 近藤信竹 (1886–1953)	15 March 1935	15 November 1935	245 days
24	Nomura Naokuni野村直邦	Rear Admiral; Nomura Naokuni 野村直邦 (1885–1973)	15 November 1935	16 November 1936	1 year, 1 day
25	Iwashita Yasutarō [ja]岩下保太郎	Rear Admiral; Iwashita Yasutarō 岩下保太郎 (1887–1937)	16 November 1936	18 February 1937 †	94 days
26	Ozawa Jisaburō小沢治三郎	Rear Admiral; Ozawa Jisaburō 小沢治三郎 (1886–1966)	18 February 1937	15 November 1937	270 days
27	Takahashi Ibō高橋伊望	Rear Admiral; Takahashi Ibō 高橋伊望 (1888–1947)	15 November 1937	15 November 1939	2 year
28	Fukudome Shigeru福留繁	Rear Admiral; Fukudome Shigeru 福留繁 (1891–1971)	15 November 1939	10 April 1941	1 year, 146 days
29	Itō Seiichi伊藤整一	Rear Admiral; Itō Seiichi 伊藤整一 (1890–1945)	10 April 1941	1 August 1941	113 days
30	Ugaki Matome宇垣纏	Rear Admiral (when appointed); Vice Admiral (from 1 November 1942); Ugaki Matome 宇垣纏 (1890–1945)	1 August 1941	22 May 1943	1 year, 294 days
31	Fukudome Shigeru福留繁	Vice Admiral; Fukudome Shigeru 福留繁 (1891–1971)	22 May 1943	6 April 1944	320 days
32	Kusaka Ryūnosuke草鹿龍之介	Rear Admiral (when appointed); Vice Admiral (from 1 May 1944); Kusaka Ryūnosuke 草鹿龍之介 (1893–1971)	6 April 1944	24 June 1945	1 year, 79 days
33	Yano Shikazō [ja]矢野志加三	Rear Admiral; Yano Shikazō 矢野志加三 (1893–1966)	25 June 1945	25 September 1945	92 days

== Vice Chief of Staff (参謀副長, Sanbō fukuchō) ==
No.	Portrait	Vice Chief of Staff	Took office	Left office	Time in office
1	Kobayashi Kengo [ja]小林謙五	Rear Admiral; Kobayashi Kengo 小林謙五 (1893–1948)	11 June 1943	10 September 1944	1 year, 91 days
2	Takada Toshitane [ja]高田利種	Captain (when appointed); Rear Admiral (from 15 October 1944); Takada Toshitane 高田利種 (1895–1987)	20 September 1944	10 May 1945	232 days
3	Yano Shikazō [ja]矢野志加三	Rear Admiral; Yano Shikazō 矢野志加三 (1893–1966)	10 May 1945	25 June 1945	46 days
4	Matsubara Hiroshi [ja]松原博	Rear Admiral; Matsubara Hiroshi 松原博 (1896–1965)	10 June 1945	15 September 1945	97 days
5	Kikuchi Tomozō [ja]菊池朝三	Rear Admiral; Kikuchi Tomozō 菊池朝三 (1896–1988)	25 June 1945	15 September 1945	82 days

== See also ==
- Self Defense Fleet
- 1st Air Fleet
