= Kōichi Fujii =

Japanese admiral

Fujii Kōichi
- 藤井 較一
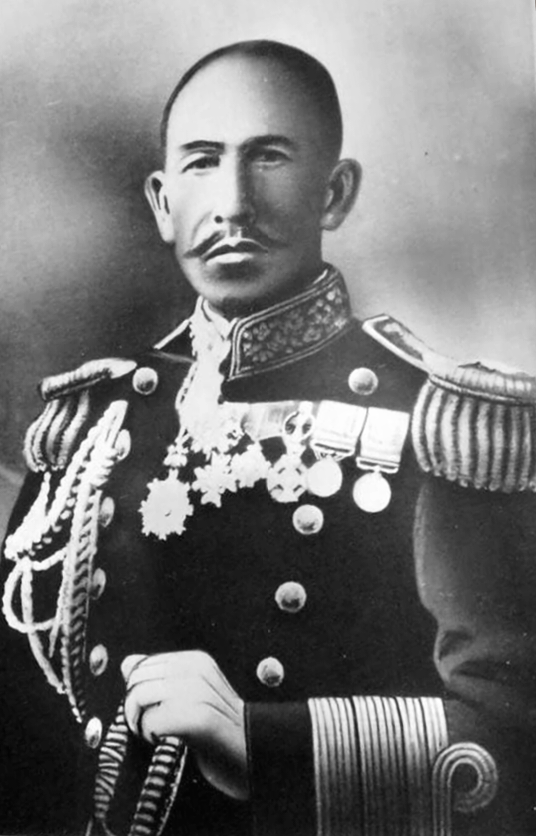
- Born: September 24, 1858; Okayama, Bizen, Japan
- Died: July 9, 1926 (aged 67); Shibuya, Tokyo, Japan
- Military career
- Allegiance: Empire of Japan
- Branch: Imperial Japanese Navy
- Service years: 1883–1920
- Rank: Admiral
- Conflicts: First Sino-Japanese War; Russo-Japanese War

Fujii Kōichi (藤井 較一; 24 September 1858 – 9 July 1926) was an admiral in the early Imperial Japanese Navy.

== Biography ==
Fujii was born as the eldest son of a samurai of the Okayama Domain in the present day city of Okayama. He attended the 7th class of the Imperial Japanese Naval Academy, graduating 7th out of 30 cadets. One of his classmates was the future Prime Minister Kato Tomosaburo. He was commissioned as a sub-lieutenant in November 1883, and promoted to lieutenant in December 1886. He served as a junior officer on several vessels of the early Japanese Navy, including the corvette Tsukuba, frigate Fujiyama, ironclad warship Ryūjō, corvette Katsuragi, cruisers Takao and Chiyoda. From April to July 1894, he was a military attaché to Italy.

At the start of the First Sino-Japanese War, Fujii was serving with the Imperial Japanese Navy General Staff; however, he was assigned to combat duty on the captured Chinese gunboat Soko, the gunboat Ōshima and the corvette Musashi on which he was promoted to lieutenant commander and appointed executive officer from February 1895. After the war, Fujii was sent to the United Kingdom to supervise the construction of the cruiser Takasago, and was promoted to commander on 1 December 1897. He returned to Japan as executive officer of the new cruiser in August 1898 and was reassigned briefly as executive officer to the Saien, before receiving his first command, the gunboat Chōkai on 1 October 1898. He became captain of the cruiser Suma from June 1899 and was promoted to captain in September of the same year, and was then reassigned to Akitsushima. However, from May to December 1900, he served on the staff of the Governor-General of Taiwan, followed by a brief period in early 1902 as military attaché to Berlin. He returned to the Navy General Staff from February 1901 to October 1903.

On 15 October 1903, Fujii returned to sea as captain of the cruiser Azuma. He participated in combat missions during the first year of the Russo-Japanese War, including the pursuit of the Russian Vladivostok Cruiser Squadron during the Hitachi Maru Incident and the Battle off Ulsan. He became chief of staff of the IJN 2nd Fleet in January 1905 and was promoted to rear admiral on 2 November 1905.

After the war, Fujii served briefly as chief of staff of the Yokosuka Naval District and the IJN 1st Fleet and director of the Sasebo Naval Arsenal. He was promoted to vice admiral on 1 December 1909 and became Vice-Chief of the Imperial Japanese Navy General Staff. In 1913, he was Commander-in-Chief of the Sasebo Naval District, and in 1915, was commander in chief of the IJN 1st Fleet and the Yokosuka Naval District. He was promoted to full admiral on 1 December 1916, becoming a naval councilor. He went into the reserves in 1920.

== Notes ==
Military offices
Preceded by Katō Tomosaburō	2nd Fleet; Chief-of-staff; 12 January 1905 - 20 December 1905	Succeeded by Tanin Yamaya
Preceded by Katō Tomosaburō	1st Fleet; Chief of Staff; 20 December 1905 – 22 November 1906	Succeeded by Yamashita Gentarō
Preceded by Shimamura Hayao	Sasebo Naval District; Commander-in-chief; 25 March 1914 - 10 August 1915	Succeeded by Yamashita Gentarō
Preceded by Katō Tomosaburō	1st Fleet; Commander-in-chief; 10 August 1915 – 23 September 1915	Succeeded by Yoshimatsu Motarō
Preceded by Ijichi Suetaka	Yokosuka Naval District; Commander-in-chief; 23 September 1915 - 1 December 1916	Succeeded by Prince Higashifushimi Yorihito
