= Yoshioka Hansaku =

Japanese vice admiral (1869–1930)

- 吉岡 範策
- Born: 8 May 1869; Higo, Japan
- Died: 19 March 1930 (aged 60); Tokyo, Japan
- Military career
- Allegiance: Empire of Japan
- Branch: Imperial Japanese Navy
- Service years: 1891–1924
- Rank: Vice Admiral
- Commands: Naniwa
- Conflicts: First Sino-Japanese War; Russo-Japanese War; Battle of Port Arthur; Battle of the Yellow Sea; Battle of Tsushima; World War I

Yoshioka Hansaku (吉岡 範策; 8 May 1869 – 19 March 1930) was a vice admiral of the Imperial Japanese Navy.

== Career ==
Born on 8 May 1869 in Higo Province (now Uki, Kumamoto Prefecture), the eldest son of a Higo samurai. In 1891, he graduated from the 18th term of the Imperial Japanese Naval Academy and became an ensign in the navy. During the First Sino-Japanese War, he served under Captain Heihachirō Tōgō as a squadron officer on the protected cruiser Naniwa. After serving as a navigation officer on the Fuji, he graduated from the Naval War College in 1901. In 1904, he became a major in the Navy and participated in the Russo-Japanese War as chief gunnery officer of the Second Fleet flagship Izumo in the Battle of Tsushima. In 1912, he became a member of the Grand Mourning Ceremony Navy Affairs Committee and a naval drill judge.

After serving as captain of the Hashidate, he was appointed assistant captain of the Asama on 23 August 1914. This was the day that Japan declared war against the German Empire, and Yoshioka went to war in World War I. Initially, he was part of the 1st Southward Expeditionary Force led by Yamaya Tanin to search for the German fleet led by Maximilian von Spee, and engaged in the occupation of the South Seas Mandate. Next, he was part of the US-led branch led by Keizaburo Moriyama to protect trade from South America to North America. However, 31 January 1915 off Mexico, the ship struck an uncharted rock at the entrance to the bay.

In December 1915 (1915), he became captain of the Tsukuba. She was commissioned by the Taishō Emperor at a fleet review held the following year. After serving as captain of the Kongō, he was promoted to Rear Admiral in 1917 and became the second director of the Naval Education Headquarters. On 1 December 1919, he became Chief of Staff of the First Fleet, the following year he became Chief of Staff of the Combined Fleet, in 1921 he was promoted to Vice Admiral and Director of the Naval Gunnery School and in 1923, served as a member of the Naval General Staff Council. He became a reserve officer in 1924.

As a vice admiral, he was awarded the Order of the Golden Kite, 4th class. He was also known as the "God of Gunnery". He died in 1930. His commandment name was Seichuin-den Atsuo Tanchu Daishi and his grave is in Ogawa, Uki, Kumamoto Prefecture.

== Bibliography ==
- Nichigai Associates (2007). Kumamoto-Ken Jinbutsu Jinzai Jōhō Risuto.
- Kaigun Rekishi Hozon-Kai. Nippon Kaigun-Shi. Vol. 9. Dai-Ichi Hoki.
- Misao, Toyama (ed.). Rikukaigun Shōkan Jinji Sōran Kaigun-Hen. Fuyōshobō.
- Nomura, Minoru (1994). Kaisen-Shi Ni Manabu. Bunshun Bunko. ISBN 4-16-742802-4.
