= Yamashita Gentarō =

Japanese navy admiral (d. 1931)

Baron Yamashita Gentarō
- 山下 源太郎
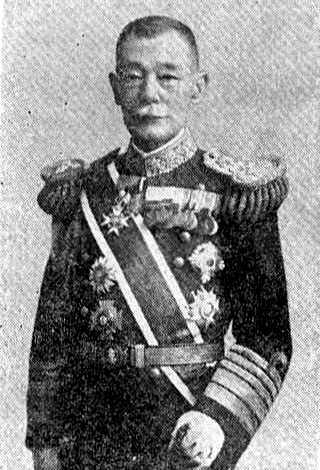
- Born: July 30, 1863; Yonezawa, Dewa Province, Japan
- Died: February 18, 1931 (aged 67); Yotsuya, Tokyo, Japan
- Military career
- Allegiance: Japan
- Branch: Imperial Japanese Navy
- Service years: 1879–1928
- Rank: Admiral
- Commands: Iwate; Imperial Japanese Naval Academy; Sasebo Naval District; IJN 1st Fleet, Combined Fleet
- Conflicts: First Sino-Japanese War; Boxer Rebellion; Seymour Expedition; Russo-Japanese War; World War I
- Awards: Order of the Golden Kite (3rd class)

Baron Yamashita Gentarō (山下 源太郎; 30 July 1863 – 18 February 1931) was an admiral in the early Imperial Japanese Navy.

== Biography ==
=== Early career ===
Yamashita was the second son of a samurai in the service of the Yonezawa Domain and was born in the castle town of Yonezawa, Dewa Province (present day Yamagata prefecture). Yamashita graduated from the 10th class of the Imperial Japanese Naval Academy in 1883, ranked 4th out of 27 cadets. His classmates included Katō Sadakichi.

His midshipman service was aboard the ironclad warship Ryūjō during its long-distance navigational training voyage to Wellington, Valparaíso, Callao and Honolulu in 1886. After his return to Japan, he was assigned to a number of ships in the early navy as gunnery officer, including the ironclad Fusō, gunboat Atago (1889), corvettes Hiei (1891), Kaimon (1892) and Musashi (1893).

During the First Sino-Japanese War, Yamashita served as the chief gunnery officer on the corvette Kongō, followed by the cruiser Akitsushima.

In 1896, Yamashita was sent to the United Kingdom to oversee warship construction and to study then latest designs of the Royal Navy. While based in London, he was promoted to lieutenant commander in 1897 and then to commander in 1898. On his return to Japan in 1899, he was appointed executive officer, first on the cruiser Izumi, then on Kasuga.

In July 1900, Yamashita was assigned command of Japanese marines during the Boxer Rebellion at Tientsin and, after performing special duty in Hong Kong and Chefoo, he was promoted to captain in 1903.

During the Russo-Japanese War, Yamashita served as an operations planner at the Imperial Japanese Navy General Staff. In particular, he was central to the efforts to locate the Russian Baltic Fleet and to predict its movements through the Tsushima Strait, leadings to the crucial Battle of Tsushima. Following the war, in February 1906, he was assigned command of the cruiser Iwate, which proved to be the only time he ever captained a ship. In November of the same year, he became chief-of-staff of the IJN 1st Fleet.

=== As admiral ===
Yamashita was promoted to rear admiral in 1908 and subsequently served as chief-of-staff of the Combined Fleet for October to December, when he was assigned to command the Sasebo Naval District. In March 1909 he returned to the Navy General Staff as chief of the First Bureau (Operations) and in December of the same year became commandant of the Naval Academy. Yamashita was promoted to vice admiral in December 1912. While commanding the Navy Academy, he was known for being honest and strict in temperament, but on holidays he often invited the cadets to his office and served them with rice. He was also a great matchmaker who arranged for the marriages of 24 of his cadets. Many of the cadets of the academy during this period went on to play major roles in World War II.

Following Japan's entry into World War I, Yamashita served as vice chief of the Navy General Staff until 1915. From 1915 to 1917, he was the Commander in Chief of the Sasebo Naval District. In August 1915, soon after he was transferred to Sasebo, his ten-year-old son was stabbed to death by a junior officer. In December 1917, Yamashita was given command of the IJN 1st Fleet. Promoted to admiral on 2 July 1918, Yamashita served as commander of the Combined Fleet from September 1918 until the end of October 1918, shortly before the war's end.

Yamashita served as Chief of the Imperial Japanese Navy General Staff from December 1920 until April 1925. He was outspoken in his opposition to the Washington Naval Treaty and Japan's abandonment of the "Eight-eight fleet" concept. Although he pledged to abide by government policies, he focused on new technologies (such as aviation and submarine warfare) which were not restricted by the treaty. Yamashita held several honorary and ceremonial posts after 1925 until being placed on the second reserve list in July 1928. He was ennobled with the title of danshaku (baron) under the kazoku peerage system on 10 November 1928, and lived in retirement until his death in 1931. His grave is at the Aoyama Cemetery in Tokyo.

== Decorations ==
- 1895 – Order of the Rising Sun, 6th class
- 1901 – Order of the Rising Sun, 4th class
- 1901 – Order of the Golden Kite, 4th class
- 1901 – Order of the Rising Sun, 3rd class
- 1901 – Order of the Golden Kite, 3rd class
- 1895 – Order of the Sacred Treasure, 6th class
- 1914 - Order of the Sacred Treasure, 2nd class
- 1915 – Grand Cordon of the Order of the Rising Sun
- 1928 – Order of the Rising Sun with Paulownia Flowers

=== Foreign ===
- 1924 – France - Legion of Honor, Commandeur

== Footnotes ==
Military offices
Preceded by Kōichi Fujii	1st Fleet; Chief of Staff; 22 November 1906 – 10 December 1908	Succeeded by Takarabe Takeshi
Preceded by Fujii Kōichi	Sasebo Naval District; Chief of Staff; 10 December 1908 - 4 March 1909	Succeeded by Ogi Genzaburō
Preceded by Fujii Kōichi	Sasebo Naval District; Commander-in-chief; 10 August 1915 - 1 December 1917	Succeeded by Yashiro Rokurō
Preceded by Yoshimatsu Motaro	1st Fleet; Commander-in-chief; 1 December 1917 – 1 December 1919	Succeeded by Yamaya Tanin
Fleet recreated; post last held by Yoshimatsu Motaro	Combined Fleet; Commander-in-chief; 1 September 1918 - 15 October 1918	Fleet dissolved; post next held by Himself
Fleet recreated; post last held by Himself	Combined Fleet; Commander-in-chief; 1 June 1919 - 28 October 1919	Fleet dissolved; post next held by Yamaya Tanin
Preceded by Shimamura Hayao	Navy General Staff; Chairman; 1 December 1920 – 15 April 1925	Succeeded by Kantarō Suzuki
