= Itō Toshiyoshi =

Baron Itō Toshiyoshi
- 伊藤 雋吉
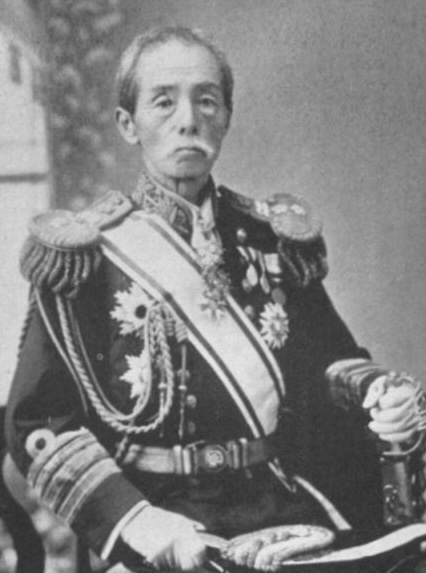
- Born: March 28, 1840; Tanabe Domain, Japan
- Died: April 10, 1921 (aged 81)
- Military career
- Allegiance: Empire of Japan
- Branch: Imperial Japanese Navy
- Service years: 1871–1908
- Rank: Vice Admiral
- Commands: Kasuga; Nisshin; Tsukuba; Kongō; Imperial Japanese Naval Academy; Imperial Japanese Navy General Staff
- Conflicts: Boshin War
- Other work: Vice Minister of the Navy

Baron Itō Toshiyoshi (伊藤 雋吉; 28 March 1840 – 10 April 1921) was an admiral in the early Imperial Japanese Navy, and served as the first Chief of the Imperial Japanese Navy General Staff in the late 19th century.

== Biography ==
Itō was born in Tanabe Domain, in what is now part of Maizuru city, Kyoto Prefecture. A gifted child with a flair for mathematics, he was sent by the domain leaders to Edo, where he studied rangaku under noted military theorist Ōmura Masujirō. He served in the fledgling Imperial Japanese Navy as captain of the frigate Kasuga in 1871, with the rank of lieutenant commander. He served as executive officer on the corvette Nisshin the following year, and was promoted to commander in 1873.

In 1872, Itō became captain of the corvette Tsukuba, and was transferred to become captain of the ironclad warship Kongō in 1878. He was promoted to captain the same year. In 1881, Itō became commandant of the Imperial Japanese Naval Academy. Itō was promoted to rear admiral on 6 June 1886 and subsequently served in various staff capacities in charge of warship procurement though 1889. He was briefly Chief of the Imperial Japanese Navy General Staff in 1889 and was Vice Minister of the Navy from 1890 to 1898. He was promoted to vice admiral in 1890.

On 20 August 1895, Itō was ennobled with the title of baron (danshaku) under the kazoku peerage system. Itō entered the reserves in 1899, and served in the House of Peers from the same year until his death in 1921.

Military offices
Preceded by None, Position Created	Chief of the Imperial Japanese Navy General Staff; 8 March 1889 – 17 May 1889	Succeeded by Arichi Shinanojō
