= Japanese cruiser Akitsushima =

Cruiser of the Imperial Japanese Navy

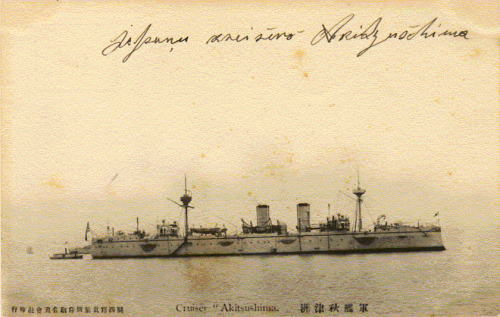
- Akitsushima in a 1905 postcard

History

Empire of Japan
- Name: Akitsushima
- Ordered: 1889 Fiscal Year
- Builder: Yokosuka Shipyards, Japan
- Laid down: March 1890
- Launched: 6 July 1892
- Completed: 31 March 1894
- Reclassified: Training ship, 30 April 1921
- Fate: Scrapped 10 January 1927

General characteristics
- Type: Protected cruiser
- Displacement: 3,100 long tons (3,150 t)
- Length: 91.7 m (300 ft 10 in) w/l
- Beam: 13.14 m (43 ft 1 in)
- Draft: 5.32 m (17 ft 5 in)
- Propulsion: Horizontal triple expansion steam engines, 2 shafts, 6 boilers, 8,400 ihp (6,300 kW), 800 tons coal
- Speed: 19 knots (22 mph; 35 km/h)
- Complement: 330
- Armament: 4 × QF 6 inch /40 naval guns; 6 × QF 4.7-inch guns; 10 × QF 3 pounder Hotchkiss guns; 2 × quadruple 1-inch Nordenfelt guns; 4 × 356 mm (14 in) torpedo tubes
- Armor: Deck: 75 mm (3 in); Gun shield: 115 mm (5 in)

Akitsushima (秋津洲) was a protected cruiser of the Imperial Japanese Navy (IJN), designed and built by the Yokosuka Shipyards in Japan. The name Akitsushima comes from an archaic name for Japan, as used in the ancient chronicle Kojiki.

== Background ==
Akitsushima was the sole cruiser for the Imperial Japanese Navy planned under the 1889 fiscal year budget. She originally intended as a domestically built fourth vessel in the Matsushima class of cruisers under the Jeune École philosophy promoted by French military advisor and naval architect Louis-Émile Bertin. However, even at the time of her construction, opposition by the pro-British faction within the navy, and growing concerns on the effectiveness and operational utility of the Matsushima class, led to proposals for new design with multiple guns rather than a single, huge Canet gun. The new design more closely resembled the British-designed USS Baltimore than the earlier Matsushima class. Bertin was outraged by the new design and threatened to return to France. In 1894, the pro-British faction prevailed and the Canet gun was removed.

== Design ==
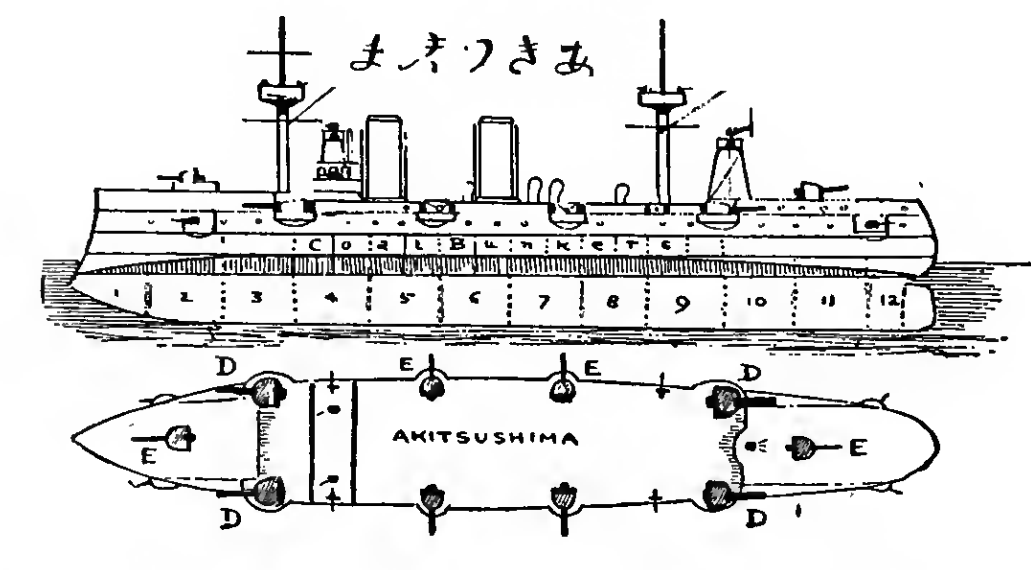
Plans of Akitsushima as of 1904

The hull design of Akitsushima was based closely on that of the last vessel to be constructed in the Matsushima class, namely Hashidate, retaining the same double-bottom hull construction, water-tight compartments and the same machinery. She was the last ship in Japan to be built of imported steel.

Akitsushima has a length of 92.11 metres (302.2 ft), width of 13.1 metres (43 ft) and draught of 5.32 metres (17.5 ft) and was powered by two horizontal triple-expansion steam engines with six cylindrical boilers driving twin screws. The armaments of Akitsushima were initially based on the cruiser Chiyoda, with four QF 6 inch /40 naval guns with a maximum range of up to 9,100 metres (10,000 yd) and fire rate of five to seven rounds per minute, mounted on sponsons on the upper deck (two on the bow on both sides of the foremast and two in the stern behind the mainmast). The rapid rate of fire of these guns gave Akitsushima a large advantage over the more heavily armed Matsushima class, whose slow rate of fire had led cadets to say during training exercises that “ by the time one shot is fired, the day is over”.

However, the Japanese navy felt that this main battery was too light, and demanded the inclusion of an additional six rapid firing QF 4.7 inch guns, with a range of 4,000 metres (4,400 yd) and fire rate of 12 rounds per minute. These guns were also mounted on sponsons on the upper deck, with two to each side between the foremast and mainmast, and one each on the forecastle and poop. In addition, the ship had ten QF 3 pounder Hotchkiss guns and two quadruple 1-inch Nordenfelt guns as well as four 356 mm (14 in) torpedo tubes. The basic design of Akitsushima was too top-heavy, and the vessel had poor stability and sea-handling capability.

== Service life ==
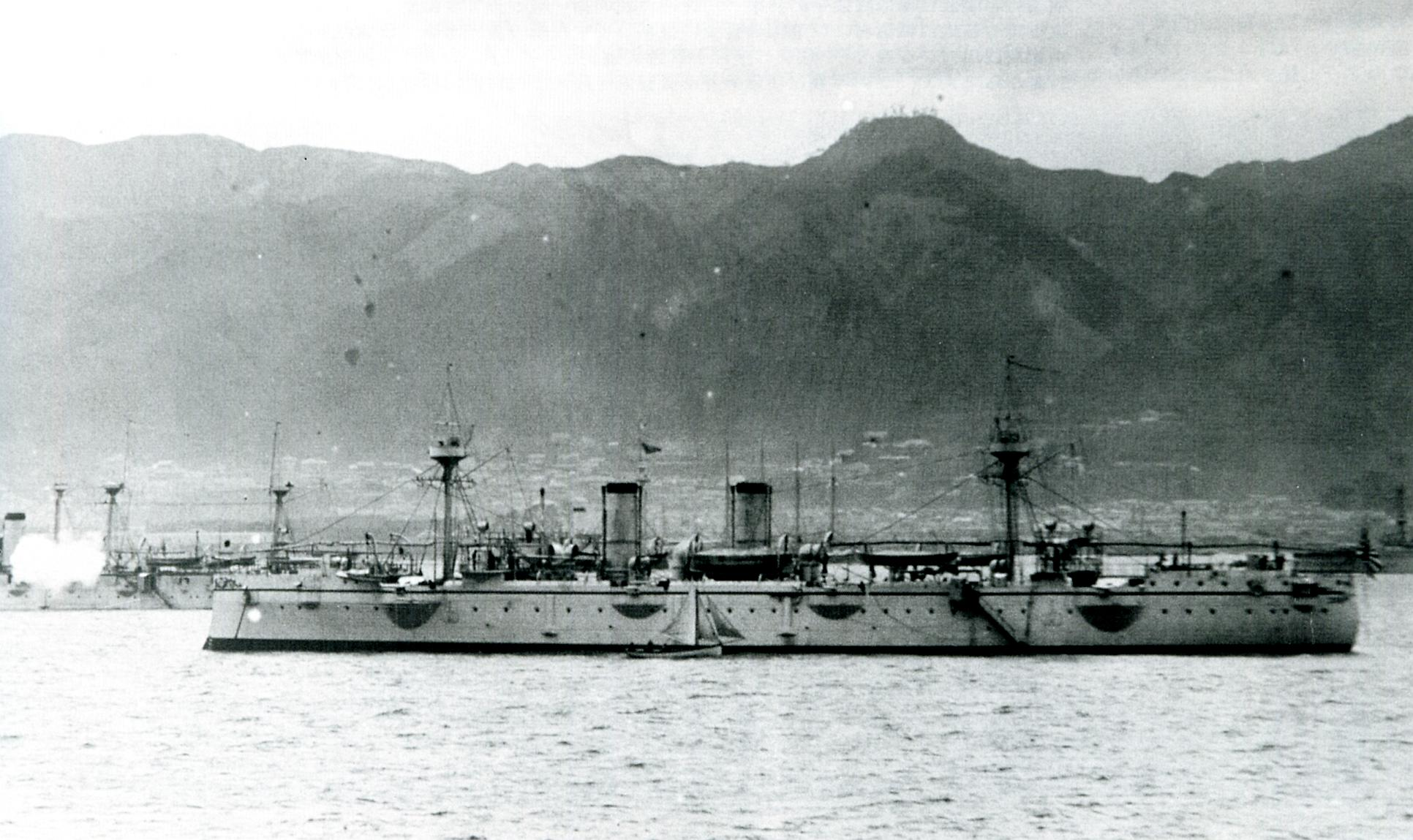
At Kobe, 1897

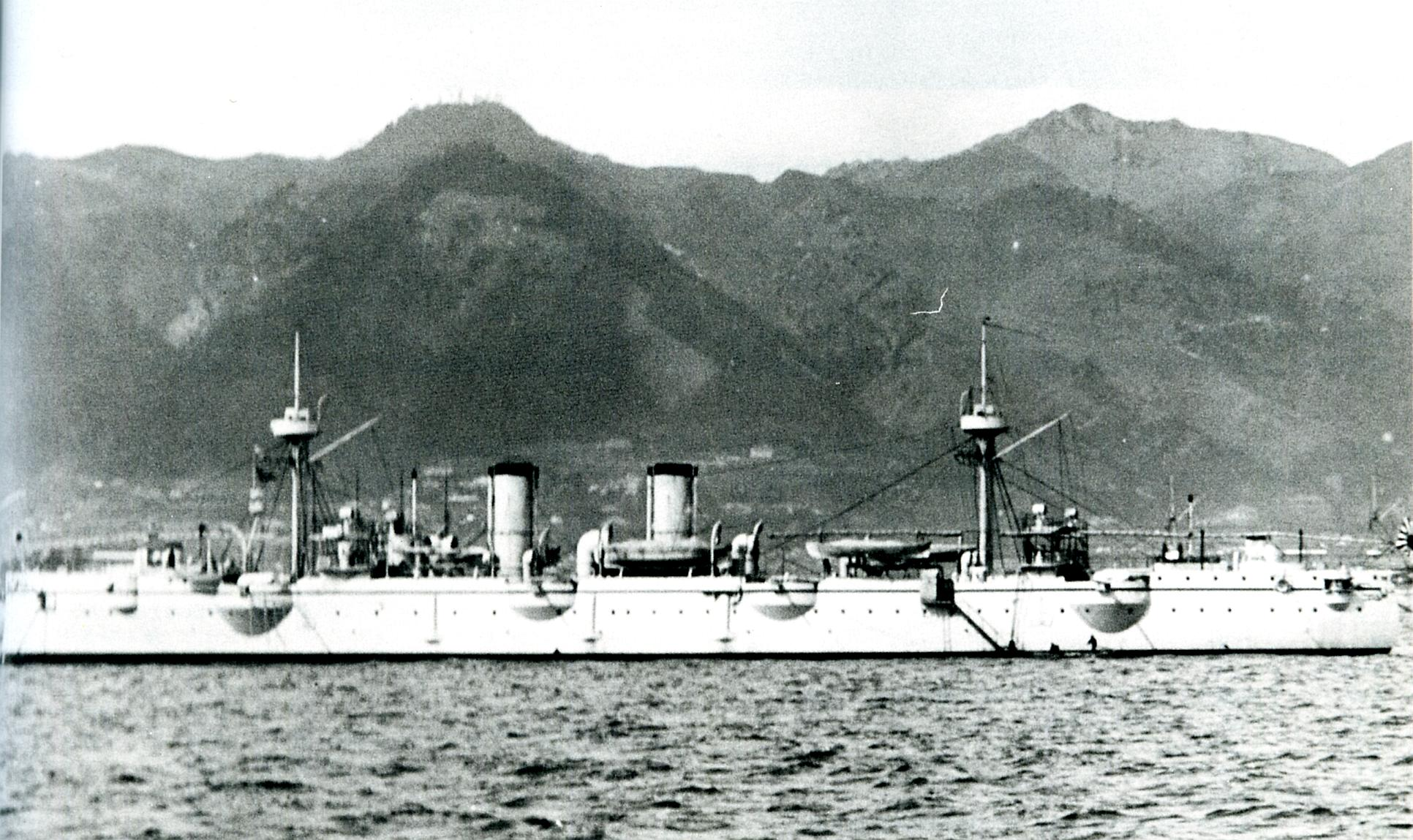
In 1897

=== First Sino-Japanese War ===
During the First Sino-Japanese War, Captain Kamimura Hikonojō was assigned command of the new cruiser Akitsushima and participated in the Battle of Pungdo even before the start of official hostilities against the Imperial Chinese Beiyang Fleet cruiser Jiyuan. Jiyuan escaped, but Akitsushima captured the gunboat Guanyi. Later as part of the flying squadron led by Admiral Tsuboi Kōzō at the Battle of the Yellow Sea on 17 September 1894, Akitsushima is credited with sinking the cruiser Zhiyuan. During the battle, Akitsushima was hit with the loss of five killed (including one officer) and ten wounded. She subsequently participated in the Battle of Weihaiwei, where her role was primarily to provide fire support to assist the Imperial Japanese Army in capturing the landward fortifications. Akitsushima was among the Japanese fleet units that took part in the seizure of the Pescadores and the invasion of Taiwan in 1895, and saw action on 13 October 1895 at the bombardment of Cihou Fort at Kaohsiung.

=== Interwar period ===
On 21 March 1898, Akitsushima was re-designated as a 3rd class protected cruiser. During the Spanish–American War, Akitsushima (which was then based at Makung in the Pescadores Islands), was sent to Manila in the Philippines under the command of Captain Saitō Makoto to safeguard Japanese citizens and economic interests.

Akitsushima, under the command of Captain Fujii Kōichi, was called upon for escort duty to protect transports ferrying Japanese troops and supplies during the Boxer Rebellion in 1900.

=== Russo-Japanese War ===
In an effort to improve her stability, two of her 120-mm guns were removed around 1900–1901. However, Akitsushima was still considered underpowered, poorly-armored, and outgunned by the start of the Russo-Japanese War of 1904–1905, and was largely assigned to rear line duties, as part of the 6th division of the Japanese Third Fleet. She was based in out of the Takeshiki Guard District in the Tsushima islands, and assigned to patrols of the Korea Strait between Tsushima and Port Arthur against the Imperial Russian Navy cruiser squadron based in Vladivostok.

Akitsushima was sent to Shanghai on 18 February 1904 under the command of Commander Yamaya Tanin, together with the cruiser Suma, to force the disarmament of the Mandzhur, under the international norms for neutrality, accomplishing its mission by 31 March. Akitsushima then joined the blockade of Port Arthur. She assisted in the rescue of survivors from the battleship Yashima which had struck a naval mine on 15 May 1904, and also rescued survivors of the gunboat Ōshima which sank on 16 May after colliding with the cruiser Akashi.

In June Akitsushima was assigned to escort transports ferrying the IJA 2nd Army across the Bohai Gulf, and to provide fire support for the efforts of the Imperial Japanese Army's 3rd Army under General Nogi Maresuke to take Port Arthur.

During the Battle of the Yellow Sea, Akitsushima attempted to intercept the Russian cruiser Askold, but failed to catch her. During the final crucial Battle of Tsushima on 27 May, Akitsushima, under the command of Commander Hirose Katsuhiko saw combat against the Russian cruisers Oleg, Aurora and Zhemchug. Afterwards, in June 1905, she covered the landings of troops in the Japanese invasion of Sakhalin.

Akitsushima was re-classified as a 2nd class Coastal Defense Vessel on 28 August 1912. In 1913, as a gesture of good will, the officers and crew of Akitsushima presided over the funeral of Russian admiral Stepan Makarov in the military cemetery of Port Arthur. The admiral's remains and those of five of his officers were recovered by a salvage team from the wreck of the battleship Petropavlovsk which had been sunk by a naval mine during the Russo-Japanese War at the entrance to Port Arthur.

=== World War I ===
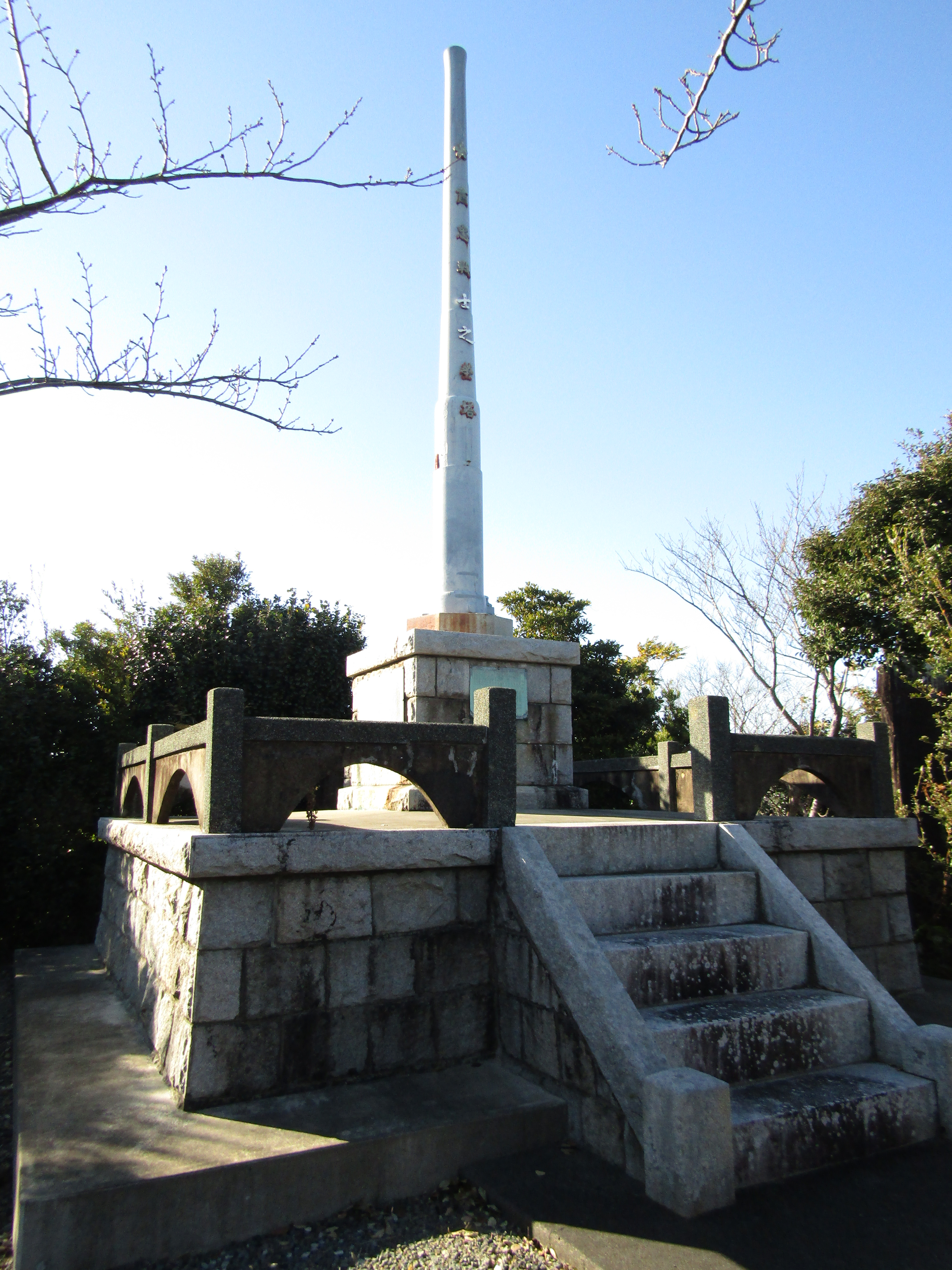
Surviving cannon from Akitsushima

In 1909, Akitsushima was assigned the task of returning the body of former Prime Minister Itō Hirobumi to Japan, after he was assassinated in Harbin, Manchuria by a Korean nationalist.

Despite her antiquated equipment and age was called upon again during World War I, to serve in the IJN 2nd Fleet during the Battle of Tsingtao against the Imperial German Navy. During the remainder of the war, she patrolled the sea lanes between Borneo, Singapore, Manila, and Saigon against German commerce raiders and U-boats, as part of Japan's contribution to the Allied war effort under the Anglo-Japanese Alliance. In 1914, in a final attempt to improve on her stability, her torpedo tubes and all 47-mm guns were removed.

After World War I, Akitsushima was re-designated a training ship and submarine tender on 30 April 1921. Akitsushima was scrapped on 10 January 1927.

One of the QF 4.7-inch guns from Akitsushima has survived as a war memorial monument (表忠塔, hyōchutō) located in the grounds of the Shizutama Jinja (鎮霊神社) in the former town of Sagara, Shizuoka (now part of the city of Makinohara. It was erected in 1926, and has a plaque at its base with the names of the local war dead from the First Sino-Japanese War and Russo-Japanese War. It is a City designated Tangible Cultural Property.
