= Satō Tetsutarō =

Admiral of the Imperial Japanese Navy (1866-1942)

- 佐藤 鉄太郎
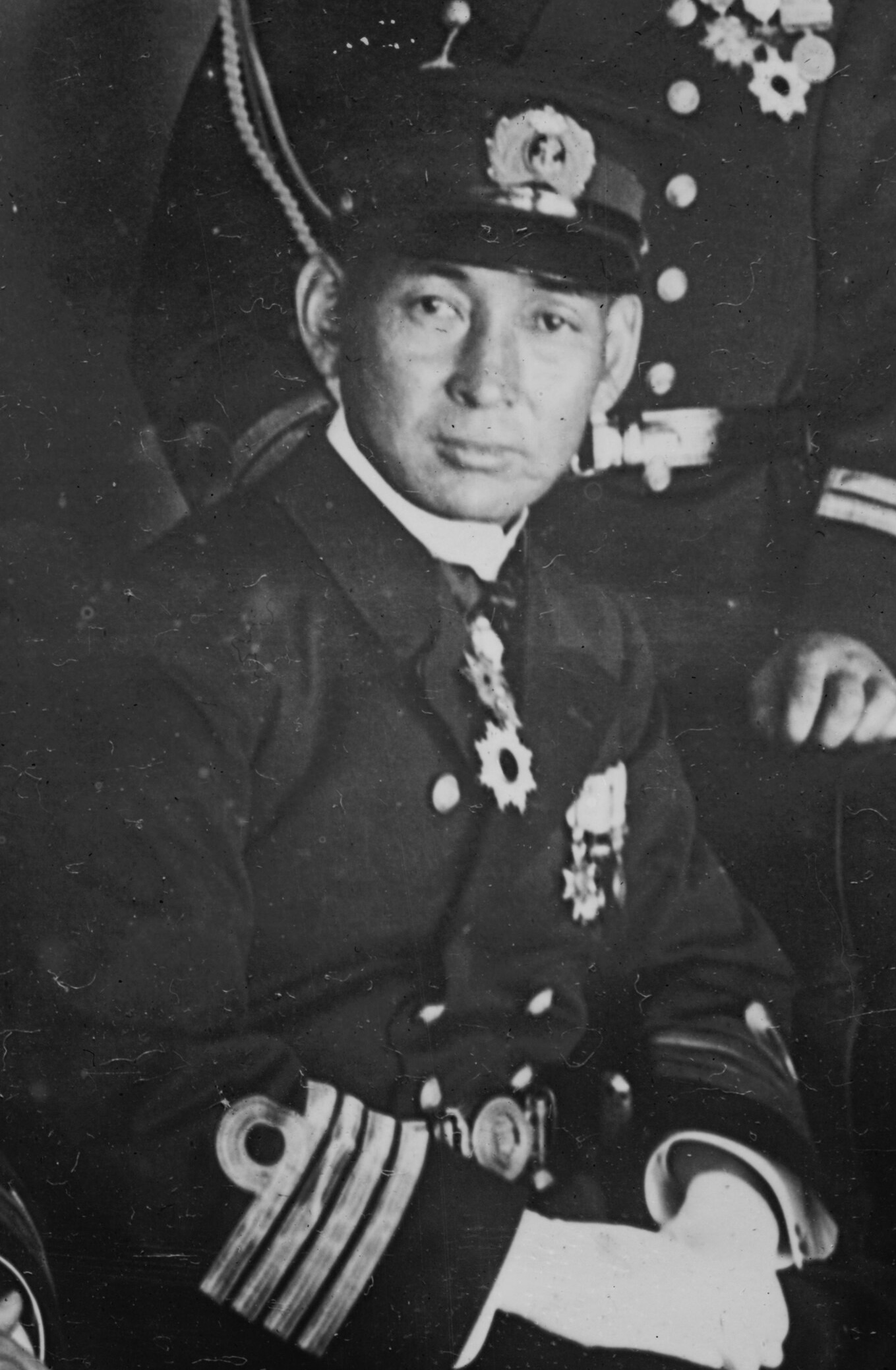
- Born: 22 August 1866; Tsuruoka, Dewa, Japan
- Died: 4 March 1942 (aged 75); Musashino, Tokyo, Japan
- Military career
- Allegiance: Empire of Japan
- Branch: Imperial Japanese Navy
- Service years: 1887–1931
- Rank: Vice Admiral
- Conflicts: First Sino-Japanese War; Battle of the Yalu; Russo-Japanese War; Battle off Ulsan; Battle of Tsushima

Member of the House of Peers
- In office 3 July 1934 – 4 March 1942 Nominated by the Emperor

Satō Tetsutarō (佐藤 鉄太郎; 22 August 1866 – 4 March 1942) was a Japanese military theorist and an admiral in the Imperial Japanese Navy.

== Early career ==
Born in the Tsuruoka domain, Dewa Province (present day Tsuruoka city, Yamagata prefecture), Satō graduated from the 14th class of the Imperial Japanese Naval Academy in 1887, ranked 5th of 45 cadets. He served as midshipman on the corvette Tsukuba, cruiser Naniwa and corvette Yamato. On being commissioned an ensign, he was assigned to the gunboat Chōkai, becoming chief navigator by 1890. After his promotion to lieutenant in 1892, he served as chief navigator aboard the gunboat Akagi.

== First Sino-Japanese War ==
At the time of the First Sino-Japanese War, Sato was still assigned to Akagi. He took command of the vessel when its captain was killed during the Battle of the Yalu on 17 September 1894. Satō himself was wounded in the battle. Afterwards, he served as chief navigator on Naniwa.

On the conclusion of the war, Satō's talents and heroism were awarded with an assignment to the staff of Admiral Yamamoto Gonnohyōe within the Navy Ministry's Naval Affairs Department.

Satō was sent to study naval strategy in the United Kingdom from 1899–1901 and in the United States from 1901 - 1902. Upon his return to Japan, he published On the Defense of the Empire while an instructor at the Naval War College, which advocated the Navy as the main force of national security and military strength. He was also appointed executive officer of the cruiser Miyako. After his promotion to commander in 1902, he was executive officer on Itsukushima and Izumo.

== Russo-Japanese War ==
During the Russo-Japanese War, Satō served as a staff officer of the IJN 2nd Fleet under Vice Admiral Kamimura Hikonojō, partly to protect him from political retaliation by the Imperial Japanese Army, who were incensed by his thesis that the navy was of more importance. While aboard the 2nd Fleet flagship Izumo, Sato took part in the Battle off Ulsan and the Battle of Tsushima. Following the war, Satō was executive officer on the battleship Asahi, and was then given his first command: the gunboat Tatsuta; however, he returned within a year to the Naval War College as an advanced student, and later served as an instructor from 1906 to 1908.

== Naval theorist ==
After winning promotion to captain in 1907, Satō published several revised editions and expanded on his initial 1903 thesis including History of Naval Defense (1907), History of the Empire's Defense (1908), and the Revised History of the Empire's Defense (1912). Satō has been called "the Mahan of Japan", as his writings emphasized that the key to Japan's safety was denial of power projection by hypothetical enemies (such as the United States), into waters adjacent to the Japanese home islands.

Satō's works, along with documents of the Navy Ministry regarding policy, would form the basis of the Japanese naval expansion into the Netherlands East Indies, using elements from naval plans developed by United States Navy Admiral Alfred T. Mahan and Royal Navy Vice Admiral Philip Howard Colomb. He also began urging the Japanese government to maintain at least a 70% capital ship level over the United States, Japan's hypothetical rival.

Satō was promoted to rear admiral in 1912, while at the Navy War College, as well as serving at sea between 1908 until 1914 as captain of the Soya and Aso.

The following year after Japan's entry into World War I, Satō was appointed Vice Chief of the Navy General Staff in 1915, and promoted to vice admiral the next year while serving as president of the Navy War College.

Leaving the Navy War College in 1920, Satō commanded the Maizuru Naval District before being placed on the inactive list in 1922. In November 1928, he was awarded the Order of the Sacred Treasure (1st class).

Named to the House of Peers in 1934, Satō was a major opponent to Japan's participation in the Washington Naval Treaty (and thus a member of the Fleet Faction following World War I until his death in 1942.)
