= Sasebo Naval District =

Pre-war Japanese navy district

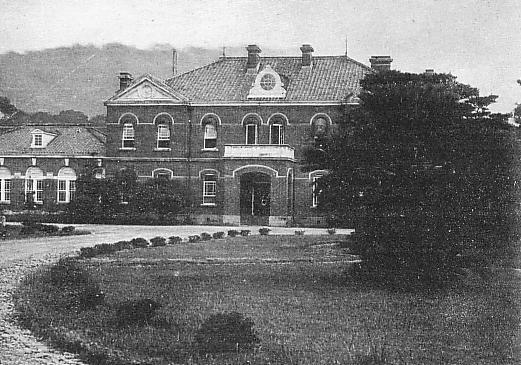
Sasebo Naval District Headquarters circa 1930

Sasebo Naval District (佐世保鎮守府, Sasebo chinjufu) was the third of five main administrative districts of the pre-war Imperial Japanese Navy. Its territory included the western and southern coastline of Kyūshū, the Ryukyu Islands, Taiwan and Korea, as well as patrols in the East China Sea and the Pacific

Sasebo also contained the Sasebo Naval Arsenal, specializing mostly in destroyers and smaller warships; and its anchorage was one of the largest in Japan. The District encompassed anchorages at Imari and Hirado ports as well as the designated third echelon naval ports yokobu (要港部) of Takeshiki (Tsushima), Kagoshima, Kuji (Amami-Ōshima), and Wakamatsu (Gotō Islands)

== History ==
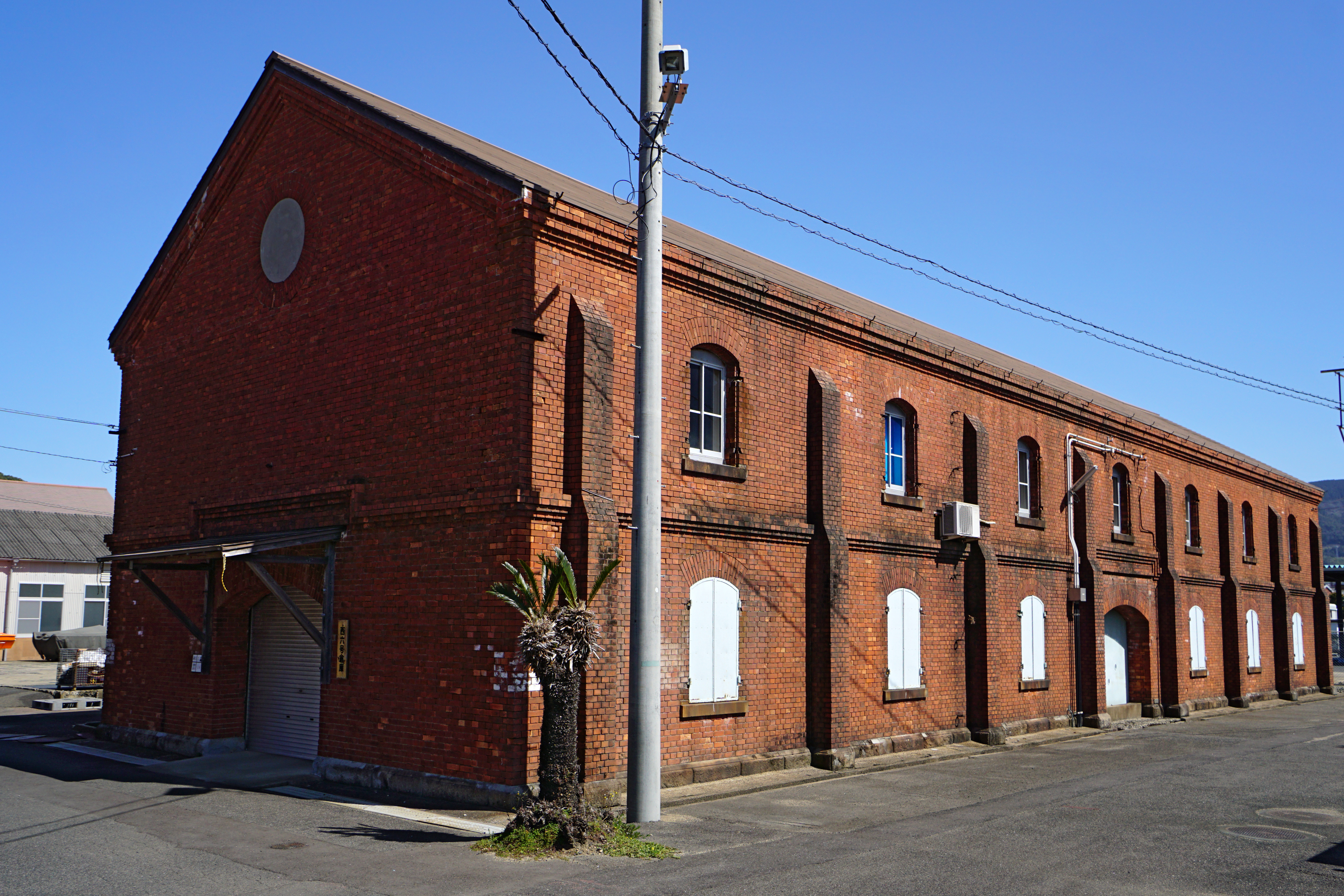
Weaponry Warehouses of Former Sasebo Naval District

The location of Sasebo 33°10′05″N 129°44′06″E facing China and Korea, and near the foreign treaty port of Nagasaki was recognized of strategic importance by the leaders of the early Meiji government and early Imperial Japanese Navy. In 1883, the then Lieutenant Commander Tōgō Heihachirō nominated what was a tiny fishing village as the ideal location for a naval base. With the formation of the navy in 1886, Japan was divided into five Naval Districts (海軍区) each with a headquarters (鎮守府). Sasebo was designated as the "Third Naval District" (第三海軍区, dai-san kaigunku), and its harbor was dredged, a breakwater constructed and docking, coaling and repair facilities for warships were established, and the military base was officially opened in 1889. To stress the importance of the base, Emperor Meiji made a personal inspection tour in 1890.

The base was connected to the rest of Japan by rail in 1898, and the Sasebo Naval Arsenal, which would eventually expand to become one of the largest shipyards in Japan for the construction of smaller warships, began operation in 1903. As with the other Naval Districts, Sasebo was intended to operate as independently as possible, and facilities included armories, production factories for torpedoes, naval mines and naval artillery (and associated ammunition), and also a naval hospital and training centers. In concept, the Naval District was similar to the United States Navy Sea Frontiers concept. the Naval District maintained a small garrison force of ships and Naval Land Forces which reported directly to the Guard District commander, and hosted detachments of the numbered fleets on a temporary assignment basis.

Sasebo was the closest ship repair facility for the Imperial Japanese Navy to the combat zones of the Russo-Japanese War and saw considerable activity during that conflict.

In 1920, the Japanese navy established an air wing and a wireless communications center in 1922. In 1934, the Tomozuru capsized off Sasebo with loss of most of its crew, and leaving behind serious questions about the basic design of many Japanese warships.

In 1941, base facilities were expanded considerably for the Pacific War. The base also hosted a major portion of the Japanese Special Naval Landing Forces. The Imperial Japanese Navy had some 60,000 people working in the dock yard and associated naval stations at the peak of World War II, outfitting ships, submarines and aircraft.

Most of the base was destroyed by American air raids on Japan on June 28, 1945. After the surrender of Japan, Sasebo was occupied by the U.S. Marine Corps' Fifth Division, and the Sasebo Naval District was formally abolished on November 30, 1945.

Part of the former base facilities is still in use by the United States Navy as the United States Fleet Activities Sasebo and by the Japan Maritime Self-Defense Force. One of the former base structures is now a museum.

== Order of Battle at time of the attack on Pearl Harbor ==
- Third Naval District (Admiral Tanimoto)
  - AO Sata
  - Sasebo Naval Base
    - Base HQ
    - Communications
    - Supply
    - Accounting
    - Construction
    - Ports & Docks
    - Navy Yard
    - Navy Hospital
    - Navy Prison
    - Naval Fuel Depot
    - Base Garrison
    - Special Naval Landing Forces
  - Sasebo Submarine Base
  - Sasebo Air Group
    - 16x Mitsubishi A5M Claude
    - 6 x Aichi E13A Jake
    - 15 x Kawanishi H6K Mavis
  - Sasebo Guard Force
    - Sasebo Coastal Defense Squadron
      - PM Kozan Maru
    - Sasebo Local Defense Squadron
      - PG Sinkyo Maru (2,672 tons)
      - PG Sinkyo Maru #5
    - Minesweeper Division 42
      - AMc Seki Maru (297 tons)
      - AMc Toshi Maru #7 (297 tons)
  - Oshima Guard Force (based at Naze, Oshima Island)
    - AMc Chuon Maru #8
    - AMc Hakata Maru #7 (257 tons)
    - AMc Himejima Maru
    - Minesweeper Division 41
      - AMc Kyo Maru #1
      - AMc Kyo Maru #3
      - AMc Kyo Maru #5

== List of commanders ==
=== Commanding officers ===
No.	Name	Portrait	Rank	Term of Office	
No.	Name	Portrait	Rank	Start	End
1	Akamatsu Noriyoshi		Vice Admiral	26 September 1887	27 June 1891
2	Abo Kiyoyasu		Vice Admiral	27 June 1891	12 December 1892
3	Inoue Yoshika		Vice Admiral	12 December 1892	20 May 1893
4	Aiura Norimichi		Rear Admiral	20 May 1893	13 July 1894
5	Shibayama Yahachi		Rear Admiral Vice Admiral (after 7 October 1897)	13 July 1894	8 October 1897
6	Aiura Norimichi		Vice Admiral	8 October 1897	19 January 1899
7	Tōgō Heihachirō		Vice Admiral	19 January 1899	20 May 1900
8	Samejima Kazunori		Vice Admiral Admiral (after 18 November 1905)	20 May 1900	2 February 1906
9	Arima Shinichi		Vice Admiral	2 February 1906	22 November 1906
10	Uryū Sotokichi		Vice Admiral	22 November 1906	1 March 1909
11	Arima Shinichi		Vice Admiral	1 March 1909	1 December 1909
12	Dewa Shigetō		Vice Admiral	1 December 1909	1 December 1911
13	Shimamura Hayao		Vice Admiral	1 December 1911	25 March 1914
14	Fujii Kōichi		Vice Admiral	25 March 1914	10 August 1915
15	Yamashita Gentarō		Vice Admiral	10 August 1915	1 December 1917
16	Yashiro Rokurō		Vice Admiral Admiral (after 2 July 1918)	1 December 1917	1 December 1918
17	Takarabe Takeshi		Vice Admiral Admiral (after 25 November 1919)	1 December 1918	27 July 1922
18	Tochinai Sōjirō		Admiral	27 July 1922	1 June 1923
19	Saitō Hanroku		Vice Admiral	1 June 1923	5 February 1924
20	Prince Fushimi Hiroyasu		Admiral	5 February 1924	15 April 1925
21	Hyakutake Saburō		Vice Admiral	15 April 1925	10 December 1926
22	Furukawa Shinzaburō		Vice Admiral	10 December 1926	12 October 1928
23	Iida Nobutarō		Vice Admiral	12 October 1928	11 November 1929
24	Tosu Tamaki		Vice Admiral	11 November 1929	1 December 1930
25	Yamanashi Katsunoshin		Vice Admiral	1 December 1930	1 December 1931
26	Nakamura Ryōzō		Vice Admiral	1 December 1931	1 December 1932
27	Sakonji Seizō		Vice Admiral	1 December 1932	15 November 1933
28	Yonai Mitsumasa		Vice Admiral	15 November 1933	15 November 1934
29	Imamura Nobujirō		Vice Admiral	15 November 1934	2 December 1935
30	Hyakutake Gengo		Vice Admiral	2 December 1935	16 March 1936
31	Matsushita Hajime		Vice Admiral	16 March 1936	1 December 1936
32	Shiozawa Kōichi		Vice Admiral	1 December 1936	1 December 1937
33	Toyoda Teijirō		Vice Admiral	1 December 1937	15 November 1938
34	Nakamura Kamezaburō		Vice Admiral	15 November 1938	15 November 1939
35	Hirata Noboru		Vice Admiral	15 November 1939	15 October 1940
36	Sumiyama Tokutarō		Vice Admiral	15 October 1940	20 November 1941
37	Tanimoto Matarō		Vice Admiral	20 November 1941	11 November 1942
38	Nagumo Chūichi		Vice Admiral	11 November 1942	21 June 1943
39	Komatsu Teruhisa		Vice Admiral	21 June 1943	4 November 1944
40	Sugiyama Rokuzō		Vice Admiral	4 November 1944	30 November 1945

=== Chief of Staff ===
- Captain Tameo Nakamizo (April 25, 1889 – May 15, 1890)
- Rear-Admiral Koreyoshi Ogata (May 15, 1890 – February 18, 1891)
- Rear-Admiral Masanaga Matsumura (February 18, 1891 – July 23, 1891)
- Rear-Admiral Tadashi Nomura (July 23, 1891 – May 20, 1893)
- Vice-Admiral Nagataka Uemura (May 20, 1893 – December 5, 1894)
- Vice-Admiral Tomomichi Onomoto (December 5, 1894 – December 27, 1897)
- Vice-Admiral Yoshitomo Inoue (December 27, 1897 – May 23, 1898)
- Captain Masaki Hashimoto (May 23, 1898 – March 22, 1899)
- Rear-Admiral Ichiro Nijima (March 22, 1899 – June 19, 1900)
- Rear-Admiral Tasuku Serata (June 19, 1900 – July 4, 1900)
- Admiral Motaro Yoshimatsu (July 4, 1900 – July 6, 1901)
- Vice-Admiral Hikohachi Yamada (July 6, 1901 – October 19, 1903)
- Rear-Admiral Shinjiro Uehara (November 21, 1903 – June 6, 1904)
- Vice-Admiral Baron Toshiatsu Sakamoto (June 6, 1904 – November 2, 1905)
- Admiral Motaro Yoshimatsu (November 2, 1905 – February 2, 1906)
- Rear-Admiral Ichiro Nijima (February 2, 1906 – April 7, 1906)
- Vice-Admiral Koshi Saito (April 7, 1906 – October 21, 1907)
- Rear-Admiral Genzaburo Ogi (October 21, 1907 – May 15, 1908)
- Vice-Admiral Baron Shinrokuro Nishi (May 15, 1908 – May 26, 1908)
- Vice-Admiral Tamotsu Tsuchiya (May 26, 1908 – December 10, 1908)
- Admiral Baron Gentaro Yamashita (December 10, 1908 – March 4, 1909)
- Rear-Admiral Genzaburo Ogi (March 4, 1909 – December 1, 1909)
- Vice-Admiral Yasutaro Egashira (December 1, 1909 – March 11, 1911)
- Admiral Kaneo Nomaguchi (March 11, 1911 – September 21, 1911)
- Vice-Admiral Rinroku Eguchi (September 21, 1911 – April 20, 1912)
- Vice-Admiral Otojiro Ito (April 20, 1912 – December 1, 1913)
- Rear-Admiral Ichitaro Nakajima (December 1, 1913 – March 25, 1914)
- Vice-Admiral Tomojiro Chisaka (March 25, 1914 – December 1, 1914)
- Vice-Admiral Hiromi Tadakoro (December 1, 1914 – December 1, 1916)
- Vice-Admiral Hanroku Saito (December 1, 1916 – December 1, 1917)
- Vice-Admiral Nobutaro Shimomura (December 1, 1917 – November 10, 1918)
- Admiral Saburo Hyakutake (November 10, 1918 – December 1, 1919)
- Vice-Admiral Kenzo Kobayashi (December 1, 1919 – May 1, 1922)
- Rear-Admiral Kametaro Muta (May 1, 1922 – December 1, 1923)
- Vice-Admiral Shiro Furukawa (December 1, 1923 – December 1, 1925)
- Vice-Admiral Yukichi Shima (December 1, 1925 – December 1, 1927)
- Vice-Admiral Togo Kawano (December 1, 1927 – December 10, 1928)
- Vice-Admiral Akira Fujiyoshi (December 10, 1928 – December 1, 1930)
- Vice-Admiral Giichiro Kawamura (December 1, 1930 – December 1, 1931)
- Vice-Admiral Yoshiyuki Niiyama (December 1, 1931 – November 15, 1933)
- Vice-Admiral Eikichi Katagiri (November 15, 1933 – November 15, 1934)
- Rear-Admiral Hiroyoshi Tabata (November 15, 1934 – March 1, 1935)
- Vice-Admiral Ibō Takahashi (March 1, 1935 – October 31, 1935)
- Vice-Admiral Mitsumi Shimizu (October 31, 1935 – November 16, 1936)
- Vice-Admiral Hidesaburo Koori (November 16, 1936 – September 1, 1938)
- Vice-Admiral Masami Kobayashi (September 1, 1938 – November 15, 1939)
- Vice-Admiral Kakuji Kakuta (November 15, 1939 – October 15, 1940)
- Vice-Admiral Shigenori Horiuchi (October 15, 1940 – October 10, 1941)
- Vice-Admiral Gisaburo Yamaguchi (October 10, 1941 – December 2, 1942)
- Vice-Admiral Masaki Ogata (December 2, 1942 – November 15, 1943)
- Vice-Admiral Shigeji Kaneko (November 15, 1943 – January 29, 1945)
- Rear-Admiral Keishi Ishii (January 29, 1945 – November 30, 1945)
