= Yamaya Tanin =

Japanese Navy admiral (1866–1940)

- 山屋 他人
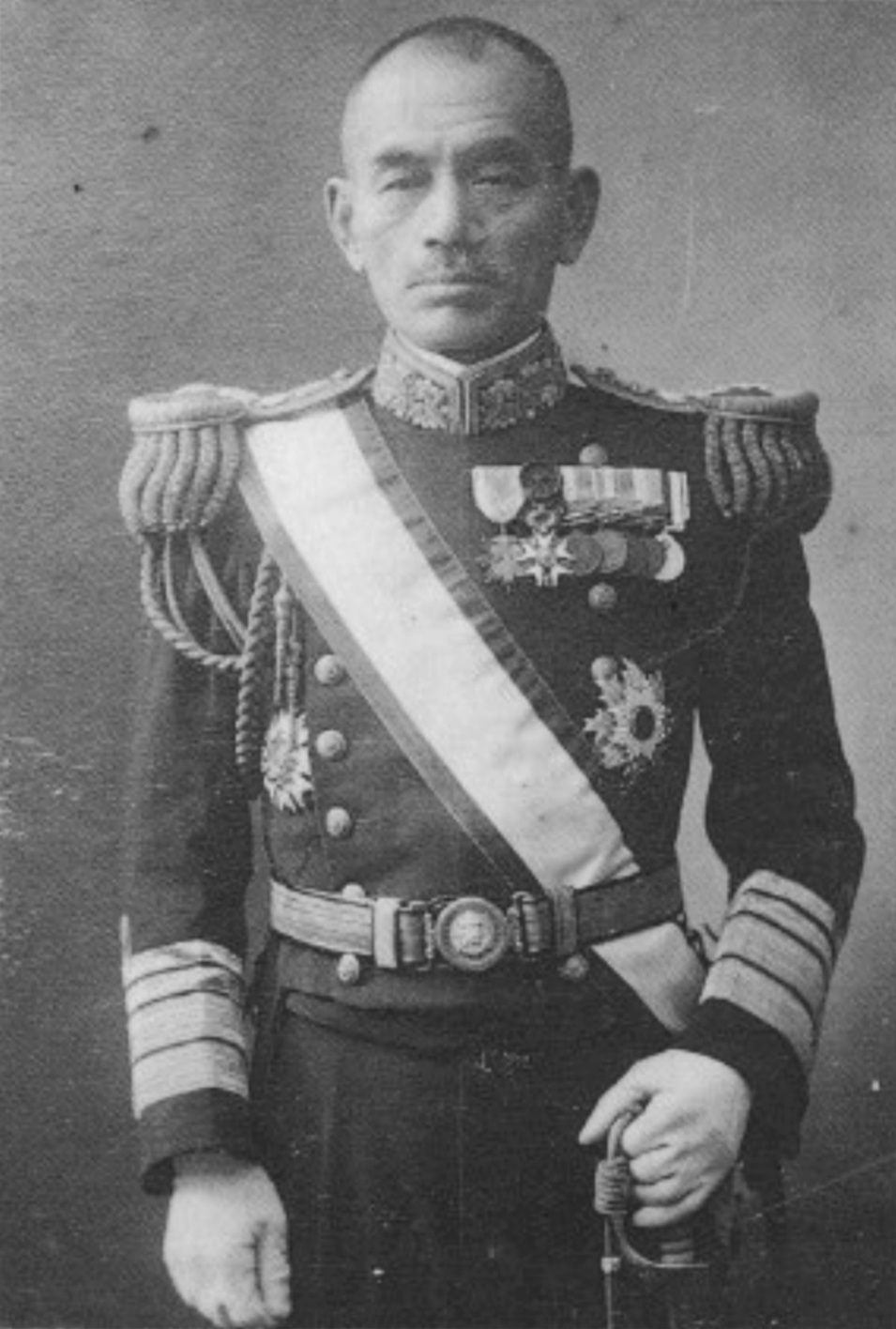
- Born: April 18, 1866; Morioka, Mutsu Province, Japan
- Died: September 10, 1940 (aged 74); Setagaya, Tokyo, Japan
- Military career
- Allegiance: Empire of Japan
- Branch: Imperial Japanese Navy
- Service years: 1886–1923
- Rank: Admiral
- Commands: Atkitsushima, Kasagi, Chitose, Weapons and Mobilization Bureau, Naval War College, Naval Personnel Bureau, 3rd Squadron, Vice-chief of Navy General Staff, 2nd Fleet, 1st Fleet, Combined Fleet, Yokosuka Naval District, Naval Councillor
- Conflicts: First Sino-Japanese War; Battle of the Yalu; Russo-Japanese War; Battle of the Yellow Sea; Battle of Tsushima; World War I; Caroline Islands Occupation

Yamaya Tanin (山屋 他人; April 18, 1866 – September 10, 1940) was a naval theorist and admiral in the Imperial Japanese Navy during the early twentieth century. He was a great-grandfather of Japanese Empress Masako through her mother's lineage.

== Biography ==
=== Early life and career ===
Yamaya was the son of a samurai retainer of Nambu Domain in Morioka, Mutsu Province (present day Iwate Prefecture). He graduated from the 12th class of the Imperial Japanese Naval Academy in 1886, ranked 5th out of 19 cadets. As a midshipman, he served on the cruiser Itsukushima and as navigation officer on the corvette Japanese corvette Yamato.

During the First Sino-Japanese War, Yamaya was chief navigator on the converted passenger liner Saikyo-maru, and was present during the Battle of the Yalu on September 17, 1894, when the ship was commanded by the belligerent Admiral Kabayama Sukenori. From February 1895, he was assigned as chief torpedo officer on Takachiho. In 1896, Yamaya attended to the Naval War College, and was promoted to lieutenant commander in December 1897. He became an instructor at the Naval Staff College after only one year following his graduation at the invitation of Admiral Sakamoto Toshiatsu. Sakamoto chose Yamaya (along with Akiyama Saneyuki) as part of a "brain trust" and assigned him the task of making a comprehensive survey of methods and developments at the naval colleges of various western powers. Yamaya went on to earn a reputation as a creative tactician, experimenting with new tactics which went beyond western examples.

Yamaya was promoted to commander in September 1899. In October 1903, he received his first command, of the cruiser Akitsushima.

During the Russo-Japanese War, he commanded Akitsushima during the Battle of the Yellow Sea on August 10, 1904. Promoted to captain in January 1905 Yamaya then commanded the cruiser Kasagi during the crucial Battle of Tsushima on May 26, 1905. In June, he was appointed chief-of-staff of the IJN 4th Fleet, and in December was chief-of-staff of the IJN 2nd Fleet.

After the war, Yamaya was appointed captain of the cruiser Chitose in January 1907. He was promoted to rear admiral in December 1909. and served as commandant of the Naval Staff College from September 1909 where he expanded on the theories of Admiral Akiyama Saneyuki, and as head of the Personnel Bureau at the Ministry of the Navy from April 1911. Promoted to vice admiral on December 1, 1913, he returned for a second time as commandant of the Naval Staff College.

=== World War I ===
In August 1914, Yamaya was assigned to command the South Seas Squadron (consisting of the cruisers Asama, Kurama and Tsukuba) upon the outbreak of World War I patrolling for German warships of the East Asia Squadron in the South Pacific from October to December 1914. Under his command, Japanese forces occupied the former German colonies of Yap and the Caroline Islands. He was awarded the Navy Distinguished Service Medal by the United States government for his contributions to the Allied effort in World War I.

Recalled to Japan the following year, Yamaya was appointed Vice Chief of the Imperial Japanese Navy General Staff, where he served until 1918, when he was given command of the 2nd Fleet.

Appointed a full admiral on November 15, 1919, Yamaya succeeded Admiral Yamashita Gentarō as commander in chief of the IJN 1st Fleet, and concurrently, commander in chief of the Combined Fleet until August 1920. He was subsequently commander of the Yokosuka Naval District until he went in the reserves in March 1923.

Yamaya retired in March 1936 and died in 1940.

== Decorations ==
- 1895 – Order of the Sacred Treasure, 6th class
- 1895 – Order of the Golden Kite, 5th class
- 1904 – Order of the Sacred Treasure, 4th class
- 1914 - Order of the Sacred Treasure, 2nd class
- 1915 – Grand Cordon of the Order of the Rising Sun

== Notes ==
Military offices
Fleet created	4th Fleet; Chief-of-staff; 14 June 1905 – 20 December 1905	Fleet dissolved; post next held by Kobayashi Masami
Preceded by Fujii Kōichi	2nd Fleet; Chief-of-staff; 20 December 1905 – 14 January 1907	Vacant; post next held by Takeshita Isamu
Preceded by Yoshimatsu Shigetarō	Naval War College; Headmaster; 25 September 1911 - 1 December 1911	Succeeded by Yashiro Rokurō
Preceded by Yoshimatsu Shigetarō	Naval War College; Headmaster; 1 December 1913 - 18 August 1914	Succeeded by Prince Fushimi Hiroyasu
Preceded by Prince Higashifushimi Yorihito	2nd Fleet; Commander-in-chief; 13 June 1918 – 1 December 1919	Succeeded by Prince Fushimi Hiroyasu
Preceded by Yamashita Gentarō	1st Fleet; Commander-in-chief; 1 December 1919 – 24 August 1920	Succeeded by Tochinai Sojirō
Fleet recreated; post last held by Yamashita Gentarō	Combined Fleet; Commander-in-chief; 1 May 1920 - 24 August 1920	Succeeded by Tochinai Sojirō
Preceded by Nawa Matahachirō	Yokosuka Naval District; Commander-in-chief; 24 August 1920 - 27 July 1922	Succeeded by Takarabe Takeshi
