= Shimamura Hayao =

Japanese admiral (1858–1923)

Baron Shimamura Hayao
- 島村 速雄
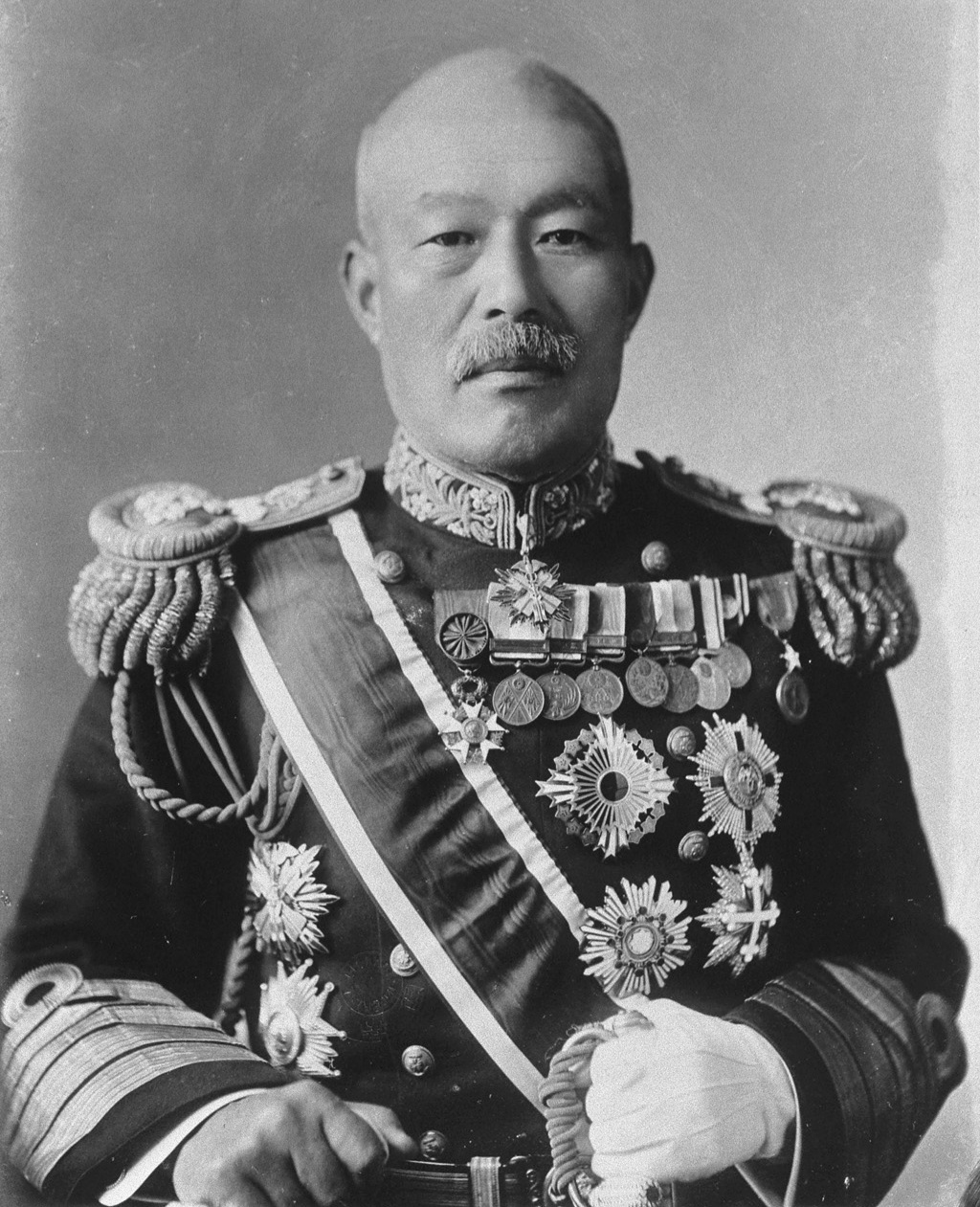
- Born: September 21, 1858; Kochi, Tosa Province, Japan
- Died: January 8, 1923 (aged 64); Tokyo, Japan
- Military career
- Allegiance: Empire of Japan
- Branch: Imperial Japanese Navy
- Service years: 1874–1920
- Rank: Marshal Admiral (posthumous)
- Commands: Suma, Hatsuse,1st Fleet, 2nd Fleet, Imperial Japanese Naval Academy, Naval War College (Japan), Sasebo Naval District
- Conflicts: First Sino-Japanese War; Battle of the Yalu; Boxer Rebellion; Russo-Japanese War; Battle of Tsushima; World War I

Marshal-Admiral Baron Shimamura Hayao (島村 速雄; September 21, 1858 – January 8, 1923) was a Japanese admiral during the First Sino-Japanese and Russo-Japanese Wars as well as one of the first prominent staff officers and naval strategists of the early Imperial Japanese Navy. He was an excellent tactician, but unlike many military men, he did not seek honor. He would defer credit to his colleagues, refrain from boasting, and openly share his failures with others. His character garnered him much respect. He remained a lifelong friend of his classmate from the Imperial Japanese Naval Academy, Katō Tomosaburō.

== Biography ==
Born in Kōchi city, Tosa Province (present day Kōchi Prefecture), Shimamura entered the 7th class of the Imperial Japanese Naval Academy following the Boshin War. Graduating at the top of his class of 30 cadets in 1880, he served as midshipman on the corvette Tsukuba, as ensign on the ironclad warship Fusō, and as a sub-lieutenant and lieutenant on the corvette Asama.

Selected for staff work, Shimamura served as a junior officer for several years during the mid-1880s. Studying abroad in Great Britain, he served as a foreign naval observer with the Royal Navy from 1888 to 1891. After his return to Japan, he was assigned as chief gunnery officer on the Takao. He was promoted to lieutenant commander in 1894.

During the First Sino-Japanese War, Shimamura was assigned as a staff officer of the Standing Fleet from August 1894 to April 1895 and involved in planning the column formations of the battle. He was later wounded while on board the cruiser Matsushima during the Battle of the Yalu on September 17, 1894.

After serving in various staff positions after the war, (including naval attaché to Italy in 1894) Shimamura was promoted to captain in 1899 and commanded the cruiser Suma and marines during the Battle of Tientsin during the Boxer Rebellion. From 1902 to 1903, he was captain of the battleship Hatsuse.

Promoted to rear admiral on June 6, 1904, shortly before the Russo-Japanese War, Shimamura was made Chief of Staff of the 1st Fleet. In command of the 2nd Fleet's Second Battle Division, Shimamura was aboard his flagship, the cruiser Iwate during the Battle of Tsushima on May 26, 1905.

After the war, he was assigned command of the Training Fleet and became Commandant of the Imperial Japanese Naval Academy from 1906 to 1908. He became Commandant of the Naval War College (Japan) from 1908 to 1909. He was subsequently Commander in Chief of the 2nd Fleet from 1909 to 1911, Commander in Chief of the Sasebo Naval District from 1911 to 1914, and Chief of the Imperial Japanese Navy General Staff during World War I from 1914 to 1920. Shimamura was initially opposed to the deployment of the Imperial Japanese Navy to the Mediterranean under the Anglo-Japanese Alliance, as he felt that this would weaken Japan's defenses against the "true threat" of the United States.

Promoted to full admiral on August 28, 1915, Shimamura was ennobled as a danshaku (baron) under the kazoku peerage system in 1916.

Following his death in 1923, Shimamura was posthumously promoted to the rank of Marshal Admiral. His grave is at the Aoyama Cemetery in Tokyo.

== Notes ==
Military offices
Fleet recreated; post last held by Kamimura Hikonojō	Combined Fleet & 1st Fleet; Chief-of-staff; 28 December 1903 - 12 January 1905	Succeeded by Katō Tomosaburō
Preceded by Sakamoto Toshiatsu	Naval War College; Headmaster; 28 August 1908 - 1 December 1909	Succeeded by Kawashima Reijirō
Preceded by Dewa Shigetō	2nd Fleet; Commander-in-chief; 1 December 1909 – 1 December 1911	Succeeded by Yoshimatsu Shigetarō
Preceded by Dewa Shigetō	Sasebo Naval District; Commander-in-chief; 1 December 1911 - 25 March 1914	Succeeded by Fujii Kōichi
Preceded by Ijūin Gorō	Navy General Staff; Chairman; 22 April 1914 – 1 December 1920	Succeeded by Yamashita Gentarō
