= Gensui (Imperial Japanese Navy) =

Highest rank in the prewar Imperial Japanese Navy

Kaigun-gensui 海軍元帥
- Gensui Badge
- Country: Japanese Empire
- Service branch: Imperial Japanese Navy
- Formation: 20 January 1898
- Abolished: 1945
- Next higher rank: Dai-gensui
- Next lower rank: Admiral
- Equivalent ranks: Gensui (Army)

Kaigun-gensui (海軍元帥, Marshal of the Navy), formal rank designations: Gensui-kaigun-taishō (元帥海軍大将, Admiral with the title of marshal, Imperial Japanese Navy) was the highest rank in the Imperial Japanese Navy. The term gensui was used for both the navy and the Imperial Japanese Army, and was a largely honorific title awarded for extremely meritorious service to the Emperor. In the Meiji period, the title was awarded to five generals and three admirals. In the Taishō period it was awarded to six generals and six admirals, and in the Shōwa period it was awarded to six generals and four admirals. It was similar to Admiral of the Fleet in the Royal Navy and Fleet admiral in the United States Navy.

== List of Kaigun-gensui ==
Note that several were promoted the same year they died; these were posthumous promotions.

Portrait	Name (Birth–Death)	Appointed	Retired	Origin	Ref.
	Marquess; Saigō Tsugumichi (1843–1902)	20 January 1898	1898	Kagoshima	
	Count; Itō Sukeyuki (1843–1914)	31 January 1906	16 January 1914 †	Kagoshima	
	Viscount; Inoue Yoshika (1845–1929)	31 October 1911	22 March 1929 †	Kagoshima	
	Marquess; Tōgō Heihachirō (1847–1934)	21 April 1913	30 May 1934 †	Kagoshima	
	Prince; Arisugawa Takehito (1862–1913)	7 July 1913	10 July 1913 †	Imperial Family	
	Baron; Ijūin Gorō (1852–1921)	26 May 1917	13 January 1921 †	Kagoshima	
	Prince; Higashifushimi Yorihito (1867–1922)	27 June 1922 (posthumous)		Imperial Family	
	Baron; Shimamura Hayao (1858–1923)	8 January 1923 (posthumous)		Kōchi	
	Baron; Katō Tomosaburō (1861–1923)	23 August 1923	24 August 1923 †	Hiroshima	
	Prince; Fushimi Hiroyasu (1876–1946)	27 May 1932	1945	Imperial Family	
	Yamamoto Isoroku (1884–1943)	18 April 1943 (posthumous)		Nagaoka	
	Nagano Osami (1880–1947)	21 June 1943	1945	Kōchi	
	Koga Mineichi (1885–1944)	31 March 1944 (posthumous)		Arita	

== See also ==
- Gensui (Imperial Japanese Army)
- Imperial Japanese Navy
- Grand admiral
