= Osami Nagano =

Fleet admiral in the Imperial Japanese Navy (1880–1947)

Marshal Admiral Osami Nagano
- 永野 修身
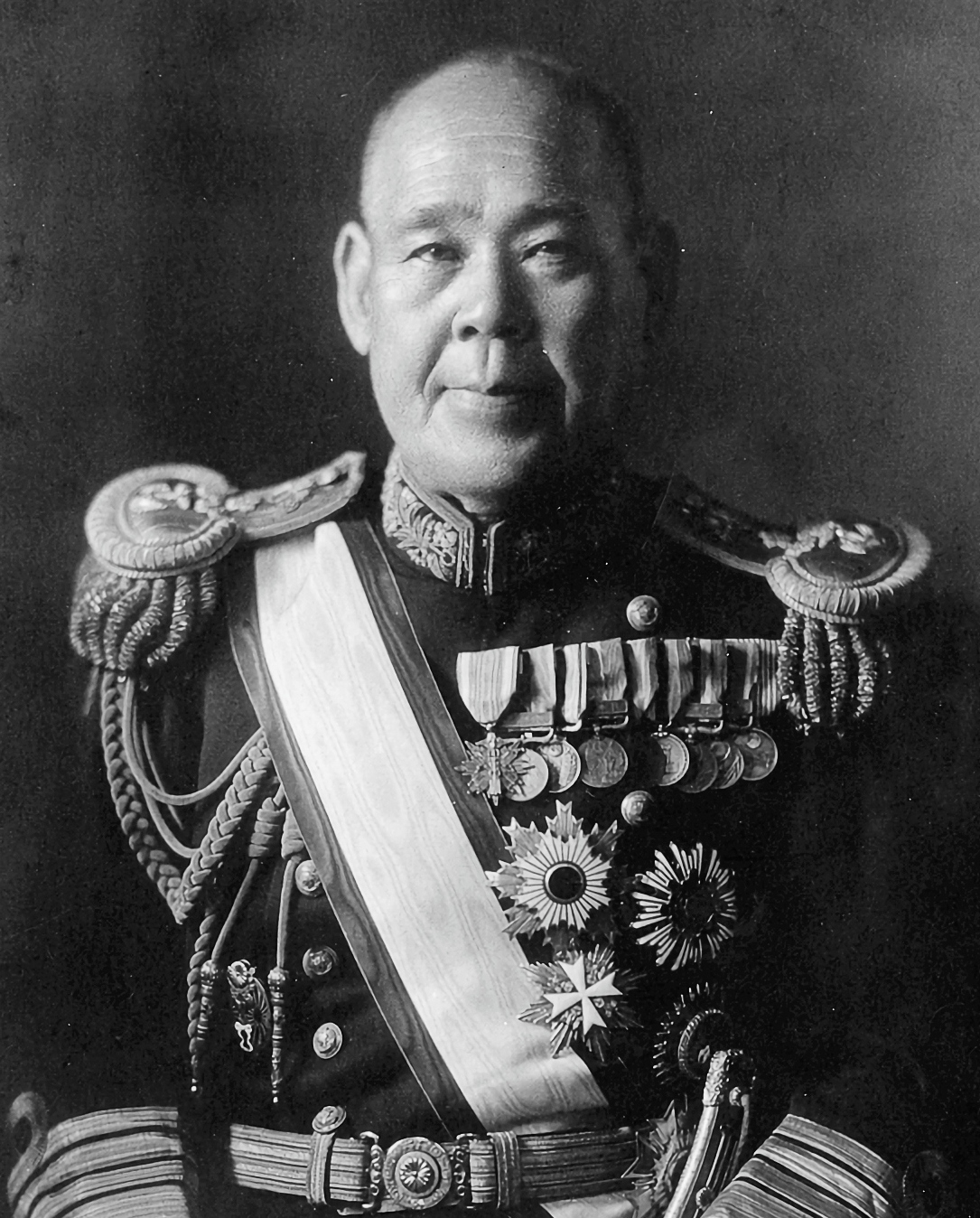
- Osami Nagano (c. 1943–45)

Chief of the Imperial Japanese Navy General Staff
- In office 9 April 1941 – 21 February 1944
- Prime Minister: Fumimaro Konoe; Hideki Tojo
- Preceded by: Prince Fushimi Hiroyasu
- Succeeded by: Shimada Shigetarō

Minister of the Navy
- In office 9 March 1936 – 2 February 1937
- Prime Minister: Kōki Hirota
- Preceded by: Ōsumi Mineo
- Succeeded by: Yonai Mitsumasa

Member of the Supreme War Council
- In office 1 December 1937 – 9 April 1941
- Monarch: Hirohito
- In office 15 November 1934 – 9 March 1936
- Monarch: Hirohito

Personal details
- Born: 15 June 1880 Kōchi, Kōchi, Japan
- Died: 5 January 1947 (aged 66) Sugamo Prison, Tokyo, Japan
- Awards: Grand Cordon of the Order of the Sacred Treasure (1st class); Order of the Golden Kite (3rd class); Order of the Rising Sun (3rd class)

Military service
- Allegiance: Empire of Japan
- Branch/service: Imperial Japanese Navy
- Years of service: 1900–1945
- Rank: Marshal Admiral
- Commands: Hirado; 3rd NGS Division Intelligence, 3rd Battleship Division, 1st China Expeditionary Fleet, Naval General Staff, Yokosuka Naval District, Navy Ministry, IJN 1st Fleet, Combined Fleet, Navy General Staff
- Battles/wars: Russo-Japanese War; World War I World War II

Osami Nagano (永野 修身, Nagano Osami; 15 June 1880 – 5 January 1947) was a Marshal Admiral of the Imperial Japanese Navy and one of the leaders of Japan's military during most of the Second World War. In April 1941, he became Chief of the Imperial Japanese Navy General Staff. In this capacity, he emerged as a leading advocate for preventive war against the United States and served as the navy's commander-in-chief in the Asia-Pacific theater of World War II until February 1944. After the war, he was arrested by the International Military Tribunal for the Far East but died of natural causes in prison during the trial.

== Early life and career ==
Nagano was born in Kōchi to an ex-samurai family. In 1900, he graduated from the 28th class of the Imperial Japanese Naval Academy, ranking second in a class of 105 cadets. After completing service as a midshipman on the cruiser Hashidate and the battleship Asahi, he was commissioned an ensign and assigned to the cruiser Asama. During the Russo-Japanese War, he served in a number of staff positions. The closest he came to combat was commanding a land-based heavy naval gun unit during the siege of Port Arthur.

After his promotion to lieutenant in 1905, Nagano served on the battleship Shikishima. From 1905 to 1906, he studied naval artillery and navigation. From 1906 to 1908, he was chief gunnery officer on the cruiser Itsukushima. In 1909, he graduated from the Japanese Naval War College.

In 1910, Nagano was promoted to lieutenant commander and assigned as chief gunnery officer on the battleship Katori. From January 1913 to April 1915, he was a language officer in the United States, during which time he studied at Harvard Law School.

During World War I, Nagano was executive officer on the cruisers Nisshin and cruiser Iwate. In 1918, he was promoted to captain. In 1919, he received his first (and only) ship command, the cruiser Hirado.

From December 1920, Nagano was a military attaché to the United States. In this capacity, he attended the Washington Naval Conference. In November 1923, he returned home, although he returned to the United States on official visits in 1927 and 1933. In December 1923, he was promoted to rear admiral.

== Rise to Imperial Navy Leadership ==
In February 1924, Nagano was chief of the Imperial Japanese Navy General Staff Third Section (Intelligence). From December 1924, he commanded the 3rd Battleship Division. From April 1925, he commanded the 1st China Expeditionary Fleet. In December 1927, he was promoted to vice admiral.

From 1928 to 1929, Nagano was commandant of the Imperial Japanese Naval Academy. Nagano introduced and influenced Progressive education method such as Dalton Plan to Japanese Naval Academy.

From 1930 to 1931, he was vice chief of the Navy General Staff, in which capacity he attended the Geneva Naval Conference. He attended the London Naval Conference 1930. From 1933 to 1934, he was commander in chief of the Yokosuka Naval District. On 1 March 1934, he was promoted to admiral and appointed to the Supreme War Council. Nagano was the chief naval delegate to the London Naval Conference 1935. Japan withdrew in protest from the 1935 London Conference after it was denied naval parity with the United States and Great Britain.

In 1936, Nagano was appointed Navy Minister under Prime Minister Kōki Hirota. Later in 1937, he became commander-in-chief of the Combined Fleet. By April 1941, he had risen to the very top of the Japanese Navy leadership to become chief of the Imperial Japanese Naval General Staff.

== Chief of the Naval General Staff (1940-1944) ==
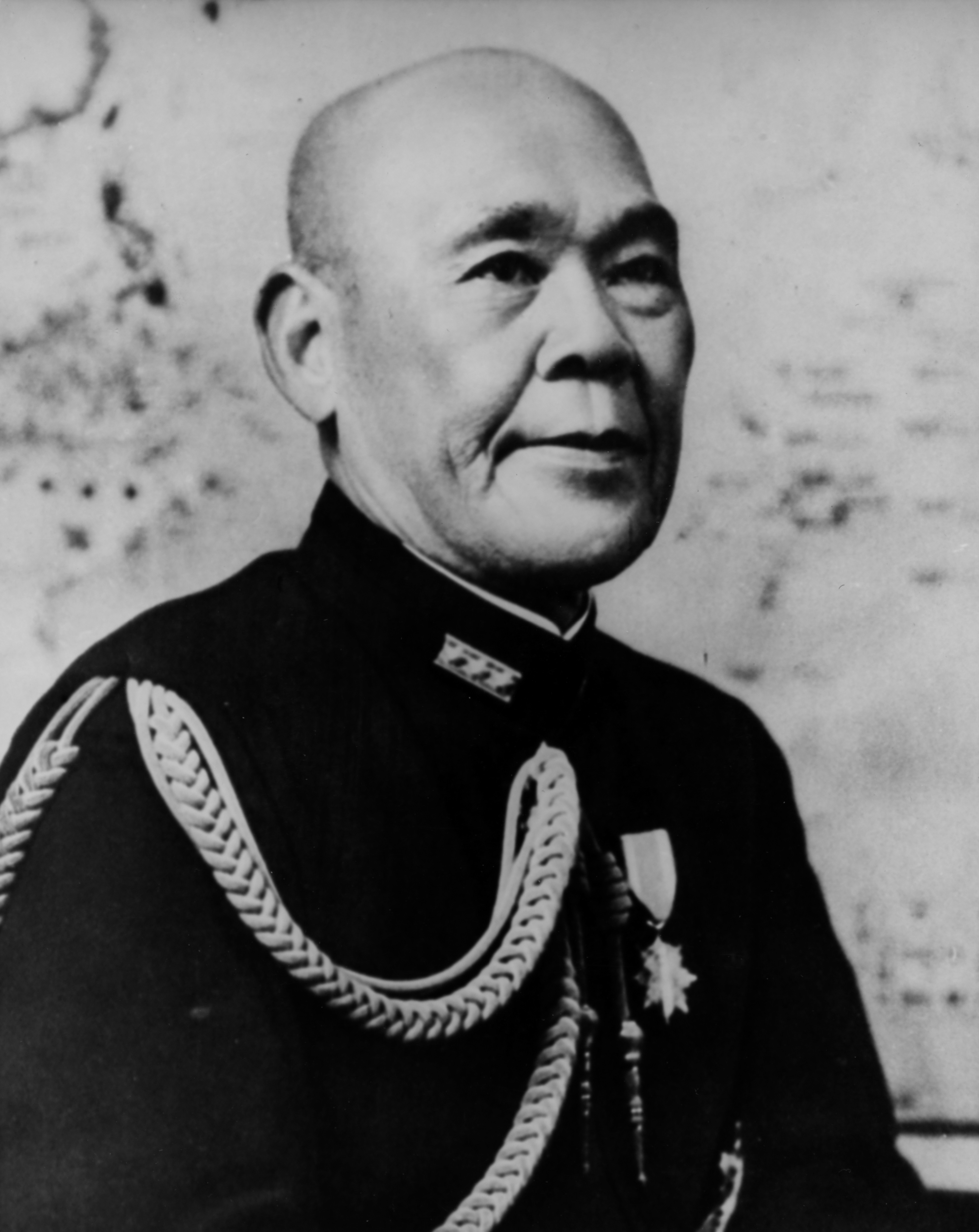
Osami Nagano, c. 1940s

A staunch believer in Nanshin-ron, Admiral Nagano played a central role in Japan's decision to go to war with the United States and its allies. On 24 June 1941, the army and navy high commands jointly agreed to push for the occupation of southern Indochina. When Japanese forces occupied southern Indochina on 24 July 1941, the U.S. froze Japanese assets within their borders, thereby resulting in a halt on all oil shipments to Japan. At the end of the month, Nagano informed Emperor Hirohito that the nation's oil supply would run out in two years if the embargo was not lifted. Consequently, he advised that Japan should be ready for war within that timeframe if attempts at diplomacy failed.

At a liaison conference held on 3 September 1941, both Nagano and the Army's Chief of Staff, General Hajime Sugiyama, called for Japan to be committed to war if negotiations with the U.S. had not been successfully concluded within the first 10 days of October. After being endorsed by those present, the aforementioned proposal (formalized in a document entitled Essentials for Carrying Out the Empire's Policies) was presented to the Emperor for his approval.

On 5 September 1941, Admiral Nagano and General Sugiyama were called before Emperor Hirohito to brief him on the proposed movement toward war set forth within the Essentials. When Hirohito admonished the service chiefs for adopting such bellicose positions despite having no guarantee of victory, Nagano made the following argument:

"If we were to compare today's U.S.-Japanese relations to a sick patient, the patient is in dire need of an operation. If we don't operate, and instead leave him be, the patient will gradually be[come] weaker and weaker. Not that there isn't any hope of recovery. But we must decide while there still is a chance [for the success of the operation]. The high command desires diplomatic negotiations to reach a successful conclusion. But in case of its failure, I am afraid that we must pluck up enough courage and operate."

Despite expressing concern over the Essentials' prioritization of war over diplomacy, Emperor Hirohito refrained from overruling its recommendations, which were adopted as national policy at the ensuing Imperial Conference on 6 September 1941. However, on October 17, Hirohito effectively overturned the results of the Imperial Conference by naming General Hideki Tojo as Prime Minister and charging him with "mak[ing] an exhaustive study" of alternatives to conflict with the Western Allies. By October 19, Nagano had authorized Japan's Combined Fleet to proceed with its plans to attack Pearl Harbor once the decision for war had been finalized.

On November 1 1941, members of the Japanese high command and the nation's government met to deliberate whether to (1) avoid war even at the cost of the status quo, (2) immediately commit Japan to conflict with the United States and its allies, or (3) prepare for hostilities while simultaneously continuing negotiations with Washington. Despite conceding there was no guarantee of victory, Nagano argued at the meeting that Japan must nonetheless be prepared to go to war immediately, given that a favorable military outcome would be all but impossible within 3 years if not sooner. On November 2, all those in attendance reached a consensus to commit the country to war if a diplomatic solution had not been reached by midnight on November 30. By 1 December 1941, the Emperor ultimately gave his imperial sanction for the onset of hostilities.

On 7 December 1941, the Imperial Japanese Navy launched a massive surprise attack on Pearl Harbor, thereby signaling the spread of World War II to the Asia-Pacific theater. As Chief of the Navy General Staff, Admiral Nagano was responsible for overseeing all Japanese naval operations and their participating units. Within months of the Asia-Pacific conflict's outbreak, the Empire of Japan conquered a broad swathe of territory in Southeast Asia and the western Pacific including Malaya, the Dutch East Indies, Burma, and the Philippines in a matter of months. However, the tide of the conflict decisively turned against the Japanese after their military was defeated at the battles of Midway and Guadalcanal.

In 1943, Nagano was promoted to marshal admiral. After losing the Emperor's confidence by 1944 , Prime Minister Hideki Tōjō removed Nagano from his post and replaced him with Navy Minister Shigetarō Shimada. Nagano spent the remainder of the war as an advisor to the government.

== Remark ==
- According to the opinion of the Japanese government, if Japan accepts the demand of the United States, Japan will perish. However, even if Japan fights against the United States, Japan may perish. That is, accepting the request of the United States will destroy Japan without fighting the United States. Even if we fight against the United States, if Japan can not avoid the danger of extinction, if Japan defeats without fighting with the United States, the Japanese people will truly disappear from the earth. However, if Japanese people can fight and show the spirit of defending Japan, even if Japan fights against America, our descendants will always rebuild Japan. We hope to solve problems in diplomatic negotiations. But unfortunately we will be fighting if we are to be commanded to wage war. (September 6, 1941, Osami Nagano)

== War crimes trial ==
After World War II in 1945, the American Occupation forces arrested Nagano. He was charged with Class A war criminal charges before the International Military Tribunal for the Far East in Tokyo. When US naval officers interrogated him, he was described as "thoroughly cooperative", "keenly alert", "intelligent", and "anxious to develop American friendship." He died of a heart attack due to complications arising from pneumonia in Sugamo Prison in Tokyo before the conclusion of his trial.

== Naval career ==
IJN Insignia	Rank	Date
	海軍少尉候補生 Kaigun Shōi Kōhōsei (Midshipman)	13 December 1900
	海軍少尉 Kaigun Shōi (Ensign)	18 January 1902
	海軍中尉 Kaigun Chūi (Sub-Lieutenant/Lieutenant Junior Grade)	26 September 1903
	海軍大尉 Kaigun Daii (Lieutenant)	12 January 1905
	海軍少佐 Kaigun Shōsa (Lieutenant-Commander)	1 December 1910
	海軍中佐 Kaigun Chūsa (Commander)	1 December 1914
	海軍大佐 Kaigun Daisa (Captain)	1 December 1918
	海軍少将 Kaigun Shōshō (Rear-Admiral)	1 December 1923
	海軍中将 Kaigun Chūjō (Vice-Admiral)	1 December 1927
	海軍大将 Kaigun Taishō (Admiral)	1 March 1934
	元帥海軍大将 Gensui Kaigun Taishō (Marshal-Admiral)	21 June 1943

Military offices
Preceded by Tosu Tamaki	Naval Academy; Director; 10 December 1928 – 10 June 1930	Succeeded by Ominato Naotaro
Preceded by Suetsugu Nobumasa	Navy General Staff; Vice-Chairman; 10 June 1930 – 10 October 1931	Succeeded by Hyakutake Gengo
Preceded by Nomura Kichisaburō	Yokosuka Naval District; Commander-in-chief; 15 November 1933 – 15 November 1934	Succeeded by Suetsugu Nobumasa
Political offices
Preceded by Ōsumi Mineo	Minister of the Navy; 9 March 1936 – 2 February 1937	Succeeded by Yonai Mitsumasa
Military offices
Preceded by Yonai Mitsumasa	Combined Fleet & 1st Fleet; Commander-in-chief; 2 February 1937 – 1 December 1937	Succeeded by Yoshida Zengo
Preceded by Prince Fushimi Hiroyasu	Navy General Staff; Chairman; 9 April 1941 – 21 February 1944	Succeeded by Shimada Shigetarō
