= Imperial Japanese Navy General Staff =

Highest organ within the Imperial Japanese Navy (1893–1945)

- 軍令部 (Gunreibu)
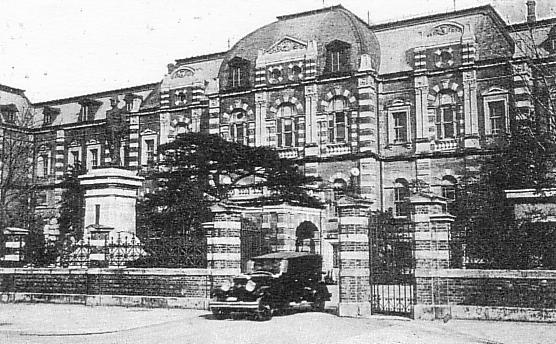
- Imperial Japanese Navy HQ, 1930s
- Founded: 8 March 1889
- Disbanded: 15 October 1945
- Country: Empire of Japan
- Allegiance: Emperor of Japan
- Branch: Imperial Japanese Navy
- Type: Military staff
- Part of: Imperial General Headquarters
- Headquarters: Tokyo
- Colors: Navy blue White

Commanders
- First Chief: Itō Toshiyoshi
- Last Chief: Soemu Toyoda

Insignia
- The IJN ensign

The Imperial Japanese Navy General Staff (軍令部, Gunreibu) was the highest organ within the Imperial Japanese Navy (IJN). In charge of planning and operations, it was headed by an Admiral headquartered in Tokyo.

== History ==
Created in 1893, the Navy General Staff took over operational (as opposed to administrative) authority over the Imperial Japanese Navy from the Navy Ministry. It was responsible for the planning and execution of national defense strategy. Through the Imperial General Headquarters it reported directly to the Emperor, not to the Prime Minister, National Diet or even the Navy Ministry. It was always headed by an admiral on active duty, and was based in Tokyo.

"The ministry was responsible for the naval budget, ship construction, weapons procurement, personnel, relations with the Diet and the cabinet and broad matters of naval policy. The General Staff directed the operations of the fleet and the preparation of war plans".

After the Washington Naval Conference of 1921–22, where Japan agreed to keep the size of its fleet smaller than that of the United Kingdom and the United States, the Imperial Japanese Navy became divided into the mutually hostile Fleet Faction and Treaty Faction political cliques. The Navy Ministry tended to be pro-Treaty Faction and was anxious to maintain the Anglo-Japanese Alliance. However the Navy General Staff came to be dominated by the Fleet faction, and gradually gained ascendancy in the 1930s with increasing Japanese militarism. The Navy General Staff pushed through the attack on Pearl Harbor against the wishes of the more diplomatic Navy Ministry.

After 1937, both the Navy Minister and the Chief of the Navy General Staff were members of the Imperial General Headquarters.

With the defeat of the Empire of Japan in World War II, the Navy General Staff was abolished together with the Imperial Japanese Navy by the American occupation authorities in November 1945 and was not revived by the post-war Constitution of Japan.

== Organization ==
The General Staff was organized as follows:

- 1st Department: Operations Bureau
  - 1st Section: Operations
  - 2nd Section: Training
- 2nd Department: Weapons and Mobilization Bureau
  - 3rd Section: Weapons
  - 4th Section: Mobilization
- 3rd Department: Intelligence Bureau
  - 5th Section: Intelligence for America
  - 6th Section: Intelligence for China
  - 7th Section: Intelligence for Soviet Union and Europe
  - 8th Section: Intelligence for United Kingdom and Europe
- 4th Department: Communications Bureau
  - 9th Section: Communications
  - 10th Section: Cryptography
- Department of Military History

== Chiefs of the General Staff ==
No.	Portrait	Chief of the General Staff	Took office	Left office	Time in office
1	Itō Toshiyoshi伊藤雋吉	Rear Admiral; Itō Toshiyoshi 伊藤雋吉 (1840–1921)	8 March 1889	17 May 1889	70 days
2	Arichi Shinanojō有地品之允	Rear Admiral; Arichi Shinanojō 有地品之允 (1843–1919)	17 May 1889	17 June 1891	2 years, 31 days
3	Baron Inoue Yoshika井上良馨	Rear Admiral; Baron Inoue Yoshika 井上良馨 (1845–1929)	17 June 1891	12 December 1892	1 year, 178 days
4	Viscount Nakamuta Kuranosuke中牟田倉之助	Vice Admiral; Viscount Nakamuta Kuranosuke 中牟田倉之助 (1837–1916)	12 December 1892 (Note: Concurrently Headmaster of the Naval War College until 20 May 1893.)	18 July 1894 (Note: Re-assigned to Privy Council over objections to escalating hostilities with China that led to the First Sino-Japanese War.)	1 year, 218 days
5	Viscount Kabayama Sukenori樺山資紀	Vice Admiral (Note: Promoted to Admiral on 5 May 1895.); Viscount Kabayama Sukenori 樺山資紀 (1837–1922)	18 July 1894	11 May 1895 (Note: Resigned to accept appointment as first Governor-General of Taiwan.)	297 days
6	Itō Sukeyuki伊藤雋吉	Vice Admiral (Note: Promoted to Admiral on 28 September 1898.); Itō Sukeyuki (Note: Created Viscount on 5 August 1898.) 伊藤雋吉 (1843–1914)	11 May 1895	20 December 1905	10 years, 223 days
7	Tōgō Heihachirō東郷平八郎	Admiral; Tōgō Heihachirō (Note: Created Count on 21 September 1907.) 東郷平八郎 (1848–1934)	20 December 1905	1 December 1909	3 years, 346 days
8	Baron Ijūin Gorō伊集院五郎	Vice Admiral (Note: Promoted to Admiral on 1 December 1910.); Baron Ijūin Gorō 伊集院五郎 (1852–1921)	1 December 1909	22 April 1914	4 years, 142 days
9	Shimamura Hayao島村速雄	Vice Admiral (Note: Promoted to Admiral on 28 August 1915.); Shimamura Hayao (Note: Created Baron on 14 July 1916.) 島村速雄 (1858–1923)	22 April 1914	1 December 1920	6 years, 223 days
10	Yamashita Gentarō山下源太郎	Admiral; Yamashita Gentarō 山下源太郎 (1863–1931)	1 December 1920	15 April 1925	4 years, 135 days
11	Kantarō Suzuki鈴木貫太郎	Admiral; Kantarō Suzuki 鈴木貫太郎 (1868–1948)	15 April 1925	22 January 1929 (Note: Resigned to become Grand Chamberlain.)	3 years, 282 days
12	Katō Hiroharu加藤寛治	Admiral; Katō Hiroharu 加藤寛治 (1870–1939)	22 January 1929	11 June 1930 (Note: Resigned rather than attend a state dinner in honor of US Ambassador William Richards Castle Jr.)	1 year, 140 days
13	Taniguchi Naomi [ja]谷口尚真	Vice Admiral; Taniguchi Naomi 谷口尚真 (1870–1941)	11 June 1930	2 February 1932 (Note: Forced to resign due to tepid support for the Japanese invasion of Manchuria.)	1 year, 236 days
14	Prince Fushimi Hiroyasu伏見宮博恭王	Admiral (Note: Promoted to Marshal Admiral on 27 May 1932.); Prince Fushimi Hiroyasu 伏見宮博恭王 (1875–1946)	2 February 1932	9 April 1941	9 years, 66 days
15	Osami Nagano永野修身	Admiral (Note: Promoted to Marshal Admiral on 21 June 1943.); Osami Nagano 永野修身 (1880–1947)	9 April 1941	21 February 1944 (Note: Forced to resign following Operation Hailstone.)	2 years, 318 days
16	Shigetarō Shimada嶋田繁太郎	Admiral; Shigetarō Shimada 嶋田繁太郎 (1883–1976)	21 February 1944 (Note: Concurrently Minister of the Navy until 17 July 1944.)	2 August 1944 (Note: Forced to resign after the downfall of the Tōjō Cabinet following the loss of Saipan.)	163 days
17	Koshirō Oikawa及川古志郎	Admiral; Koshirō Oikawa 及川古志郎 (1883–1958)	2 August 1944	29 May 1945 (Note: Resigned in protest of the Emperor's refusal to consider peace proposals.)	300 days
18	Soemu Toyoda豊田副武	Admiral; Soemu Toyoda 豊田副武 (1885–1957)	29 May 1945	15 October 1945	139 days

== See also ==
- Ministry of the Navy (Japan)

== Bibliography ==
- Asada, Sadao (2006). From Mahan to Pearl Harbor: The Imperial Japanese Navy and the United States. US Naval Institute Press. ISBN 1-55750-042-8.
- Schencking, J. Charles (2005). Making Waves: Politics, Propaganda, And The Emergence Of The Imperial Japanese Navy, 1868-1922. Stanford University Press. ISBN 0-8047-4977-9.
- Spector, Ronald (1985). Eagle Against the Sun. New York: Vintage Books. ISBN 0-394-74101-3.
