= Zengo Yoshida =

Japanese admiral

- 吉田 善吾
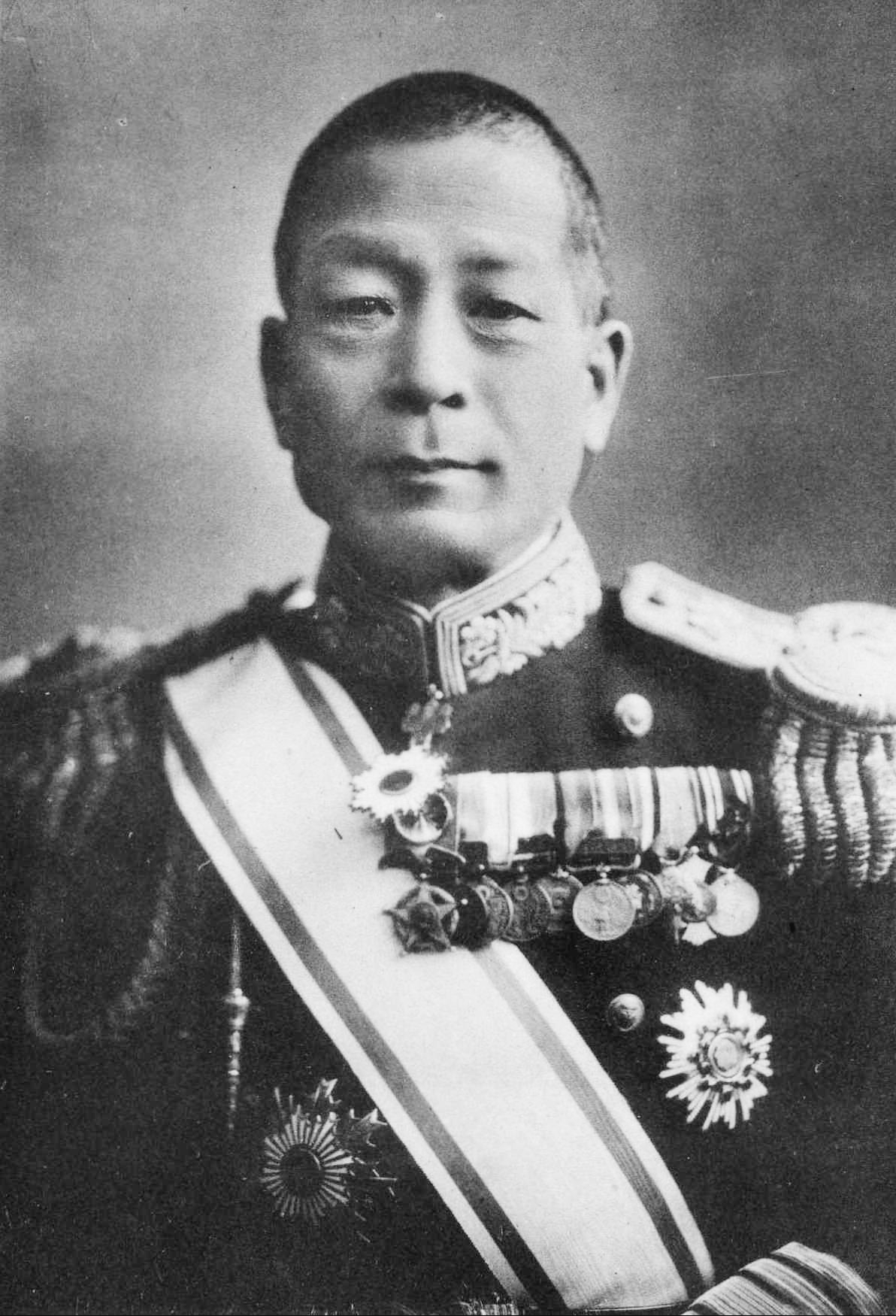
- Yoshida, c. 1940

Minister of the Navy
- In office 30 August 1939 – 5 September 1940
- Prime Minister: Nobuyuki Abe; Mitsumasa Yonai; Fumimaro Konoe
- Preceded by: Yonai Mitsumasa
- Succeeded by: Oikawa Koshirō

Member of the Supreme War Council
- In office 2 August 1944 – 1 June 1945
- Monarch: Hirohito
- In office 1 December 1943 – 3 May 1944
- Monarch: Hirohito
- In office 15 November 1940 – 10 November 1942
- Monarch: Hirohito

Personal details
- Born: 14 February 1885 Saga Prefecture, Japan
- Died: 14 November 1966 (aged 81) Tokyo, Japan
- Resting place: Tama Cemetery

Military service
- Allegiance: Empire of Japan
- Branch/service: Imperial Japanese Navy
- Years of service: 1904–1945
- Rank: Admiral
- Commands: Hirado, Kongō, Mutsu, Weapons and Mobilization Bureau, Naval Affairs Bureau, Training Fleet, 2nd Fleet, Combined Fleet, 1st Fleet, Naval Councillor, China Area Fleet, Naval War College, Yokosuka Naval District
- Battles/wars: Russo-Japanese War; Battle of Tsushima; Second Sino-Japanese War; Second World War; Pacific War

Zengo Yoshida (吉田 善吾, Yoshida Zengo; 14 February 1885 – 14 November 1966) was a Japanese admiral in the Imperial Japanese Navy.

== Military career ==
Yoshida was born as the fourth son of an ex-samurai, Mine Kohachi, in Saga Prefecture in 1885, and was adopted into the family of a local rice merchant named Yoshida. The future Fleet Admiral Mineichi Koga was a friend from his childhood. Yoshida was graduate of the 32nd class of the Imperial Japanese Naval Academy in 1904, ranking 12th out of 190 cadets. The Russo-Japanese War had just started, and he served as a midshipman on the submarine tender Karasaki, and participated in the Battle of Tsushima aboard the cruiser Kasuga.

He attended naval artillery and torpedo school in 1906–1907, and was then assigned to the destroyer Asatsuyu followed by the cruiser Hashidate. As a lieutenant from 1909, he specialized in torpedo warfare, and graduated from the Naval Staff College in 1913. His classmates included Kōichi Shiozawa and Shigetarō Shimada.

Yoshida was promoted to lieutenant commander in 1915, and commander in 1919, serving in a variety of administrative positions, primarily concerned with training. After his promotion to captain in 1923, he was given his first command in 1924; the cruiser Hirado. He served as chief of staff of the Maizuru Naval District from 1924 to 1925. In December 1927, he assumed command of the battleship Kongō, and from December 1928, battleship Mutsu. He was promoted to rear admiral on 30 November 1929.

Yoshida served as chief-of-staff of the Combined Fleet from December 1931 to September 1933 and was promoted to vice admiral on 15 November 1934, and Director, Bureau of Naval Affairs, within the Navy Ministry. He was then made commander of the Training Fleet from February to December 1936, and of the IJN 2nd Fleet from December 1936, and commander-in-chief of the Combined Fleet to December 1937.

== Political career ==
On 30 August 1939, Yoshida became Navy Minister under the cabinet of Prime Minister Abe Nobuyuki. He continued in the same position under the administrations of Yonai Mitsumasa and Konoe Fumimaro. As Navy Minister, Yoshida was vehement in his opposition to signing of the Tripartite Pact between Imperial Japan, Nazi Germany, and Fascist Italy. He also strongly opposed the idea of war against the United States. He was forced to resign due to illness and opposition to the pact on 5 September 1940, just before the arrival of the negotiating team from Germany, and the treaty went ahead despite his strong misgivings.

Yoshida was promoted to full admiral on 15 November 1940 and was made a member of the Supreme War Council. After the start of World War II, Yoshida was assigned a combat command, and took control of the China Area Fleet from November 1942. In December 1943 he became commandant of the Naval Staff College, and from May 1944 was commander of the Yokosuka Naval District. He entered the reserves in June 1945.

Yoshida died in November 1966, and his grave is at the Tama Cemetery in Fuchū, Tokyo.

== Decorations ==
- 1924 – Order of the Sacred Treasure, 3rd class
- 1934 – Order of the Sacred Treasure, 2nd class

== In popular culture ==
In the 1970 film Tora! Tora! Tora!, Yoshida was portrayed by Japanese actor Jun Usami.

== Notes ==
Military offices
Preceded by Kanoe Saburō	Hirado; Commanding Officer; 25 March 1924 - 1 December 1924	Succeeded by Fukushima Kanzō
Preceded by Ikeda Tanin	Maizuru Naval District; Chief-of-staff; 1 December 1924 - 15 April 1925	Succeeded by Matsuyama Shigeru
Preceded by Matsushita Hajime	Kongō; Commanding Officer; 1 December 1927 - 10 December 1928	Succeeded by Ikenaka Kenichi
Preceded by Hori Teikichi	Mutsu; Commanding Officer; 10 December 1928 - 30 November 1929	Succeeded by Anno Kiyoshi
Preceded by Shimada Shigetarō	Combined Fleet & 1st Fleet; Chief-of-staff; 1 December 1931 - 15 September 1933	Succeeded by Toyoda Soemu
Preceded by Katō Takayoshi	2nd Fleet; Commander-in-chief; 1 December 1936 – 1 December 1937	Succeeded by Shimada Shigetarō
Preceded by Nagano Osami	Combined Fleet & 1st Fleet; Commander-in-chief; 1 December 1937 – 30 August 1939	Succeeded by Yamamoto Isoroku
Political offices
Preceded by Yonai Mitsumasa	Minister of the Navy; 30 August 1939 – 5 September 1940	Succeeded by Oikawa Koshirō
Military offices
Preceded by Koga Mineichi	China Area Fleet; Commander-in-chief; 10 November 1942 - 1 December 1943	Succeeded by Kondō Nobutake
Vacant; post last held by Oikawa Koshirō	Naval War College; Headmaster; 14 December 1943 - 15 March 1944	Succeeded by Itō Seiichi
Preceded by Toyoda Soemu	Yokosuka Naval District; Commander-in-chief; 3 May 1944 – 2 August 1944	Succeeded by Nomura Naokuni
