= Hajime Matsushita =

Imperial Japanese Navy vice admiral and educator (1884–1953)

- 松下 元
- Born: August 10, 1884; Fukuoka, Japan
- Died: December 1, 1953 (aged 69)
- Military career
- Allegiance: Empire of Japan
- Branch: Imperial Japanese Navy
- Service years: 1903–1937
- Rank: Vice admiral
- Commands: Tenryū, Kongō, Naval Personnel Bureau, 3rd Squadron, Naval Academy, Training Fleet, Maizuru Naval District, Sasebo Naval District
- Conflicts: Russo-Japanese War; Battle of Tsushima

Hajime Matsushita (松下 元, Matsushita Hajime; August 10, 1884 – December 1, 1953) was a vice admiral in the Imperial Japanese Navy and an educator.

== Career ==
A native of Fukuoka Prefecture, Matsushita graduated from the 31st class of the Imperial Japanese Naval Academy in 1903. He was assigned to serve on the cruiser Matsushima during the early stages of the Russo-Japanese War of 1904-1905, and was on the cruiser Yakumo during the decisive Battle of Tsushima. After the end of the war, he served on the cruiser Hashidate from November 1905 to October 1906. After graduation from the Naval Artillery School, he returned to Yakumo as a lieutenant. He then served as gunnery officer aboard the Takao, followed by the battleship Satsuma. He was subsequently Chief of staff to the IJN 1st Fleet. In May 1914, he graduated from the 12th class of the Navy Staff College as a lieutenant commander. After a posting as gunnery officer on the cruiser Aso, he was sent to London in October 1917 as a military attache. Matsushita was promoted to commander while in London, and after his return in December 1919, was assigned to the staff of the IJN 4th Fleet.

In January 1921, Matsushita served as chief secretary to Minister of the Navy Admiral Katō Tomosaburō. In December 1922, he was promoted to captain, and given his first command, that of the cruiser Tenryū. After a posting to the Naval Personnel Bureau, he returned to sea as captain of the battleship Kongō in December 1925. Matsushita was promoted to rear admiral in December 1927.

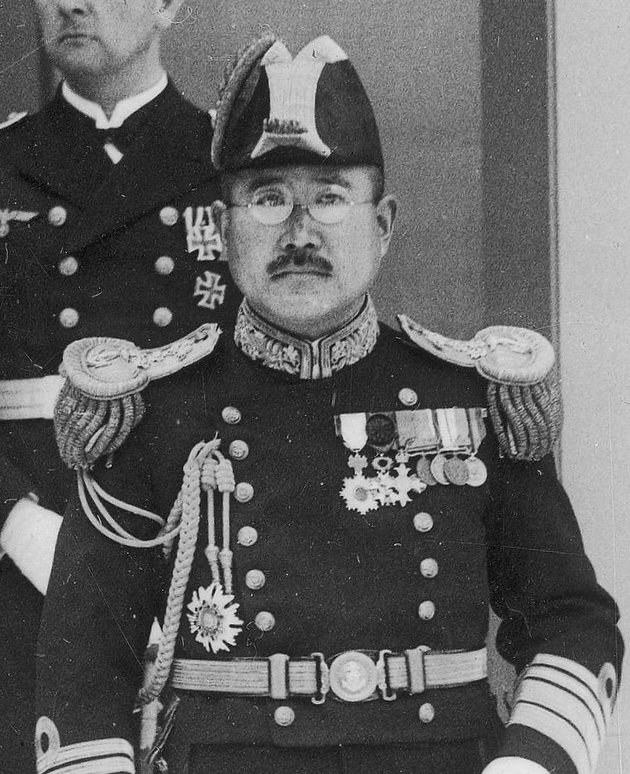
Matsushita in 1934

As Commandant of the Imperial Japanese Naval Academy in the early-1930s, Matsuhita is credited with devising the Gosei or "Five Reflections". These words became traditional precepts of cadets at the Imperial Japanese Naval Academy. Every evening cadets were expected to meditate on these inter-related questions. The Japan Maritime Self Defense Force (JMSDF) continues to use of the Gosei as a self-reflective exercise. Matsushita was promoted to vice admiral in December 1932. He subsequently served as Commander in Chief of the Training Fleet from October 1933, Commander of the Maizuru Naval District from November 1934, and Commander of the Sasebo Naval District from March 1936 before retiring in March 1937.

== Notes ==
Military offices
Preceded by Hyakutake Gengo	Commander-in-chief of Maizuru Guard District; 15 November 1934 - 2 December 1935	Succeeded by Shiozawa Kōichi
Preceded by Hyakutake Gengo	Commander-in-chief of Sasebo Naval District; 16 March 1936 - 1 December 1936	Succeeded by Shiozawa Kōichi
