= Sōjirō Tochiuchi =

Japanese admiral (1866–1932)

Sōjirō Tochiuchi Junior Second Rank
- 栃内曽次郎
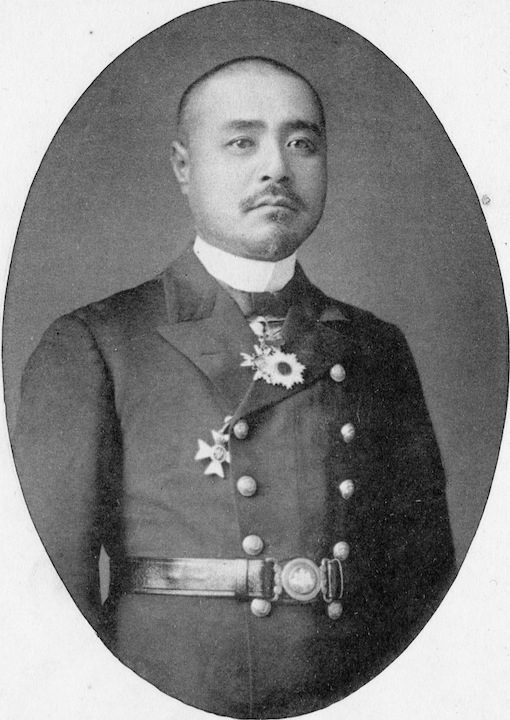
- Tochiuchi as commander of the Training Fleet
- Born: July 19, 1866; Morioka, Japan
- Died: July 12, 1932 (aged 65); Morioka, Iwate, Japan
- Military career
- Allegiance: Japan
- Branch: Imperial Japanese Navy
- Service years: 1886 – 1924
- Rank: Admiral
- Commands: Miyako; Suma
- Conflicts: First Sino-Japanese War; Russo-Japanese War; Battle of Tsushima

Sōjirō Tochiuchi (栃内曽次郎, Tochiuchi Sōjirō; July 19, 1866 – July 12, 1932) was a Japanese Admiral of the First Sino-Japanese War and the Russo-Japanese War. He commanded the Suma during the Battle of Tsushima and also a member of the House of Peers.

== Biography ==
Born in Ueda Village, Iwate Prefecture as the second son of Rihei Tochiuchi, a samurai of the Morioka Domain. After going through the preparatory course of Sapporo Agricultural College and Kogyokusha Junior & Senior High School, he graduated from the Imperial Japanese Naval Academy from its 13th class on 1886. On 1891, he graduated from the Naval War College and served in the First Sino-Japanese War as squad leader of Kongō, squad leader of the Lushun Port Torpedo Laying Corps, and torpedo leader of Fusō. After the war, he became a torpedo training school instructor. In 1897, he went on a business trip to the United Kingdom as a member of the Asama navigation committee and returned to Japan in 1899 as the chief of the Asama torpedoes. In 1900, he served Gonnohyōe Yamamoto as Adjutant to the Ministry of the Navy and Secretary to the Minister of the Navy .

At the start of the Russo-Japanese War, he initially served as captain of the Miyako but after the Miyako was sunk by a mine. After temporarily serving as captain of Musashi and the temporary cruiser Hachimanmaru, he served as captain of the Suma during the Battle of Tsushima. After the war, he served as a military attaché to the British Embassy for three and a half years. In 1909, he returned to Japan and became Rear Admiral of the Navy and Director of the Military Affairs Bureau in the same year. In addition, he successively served as Commander of the 2nd Fleet, Commander of the 1st Fleet, Commander of the 4th Squadron, Commander of the 3rd Squadron, Chief of the Technical Headquarters and in 1917, became Vice Minister of the Navy .

In 1920, he was appointed Admiral of the Navy, served as Chief of the 1st Fleet, Commander-in-Chief of the Combined Fleet, Commander-in-Chief of the Sasebo Naval District, and Military Counselor, and was transferred to the Reserve in 1924. Afterwards, he was in opposition to the London Naval Treaty. He became a member of the House of Peers on March 15, 1932, but on July 8 of the same year, he collapsed while giving a lecture at the time of his inauguration as the principal of the Iwate Junior and Senior High School in Morioka City and died there.

== Court Ranks ==
- Senior Eighth Rank (December 14, 1891)
- Junior Seventh Rank (January 31, 1893)
- Senior Seventh Rank (November 26, 1895)
- Junior Sixth Rank (October 31, 1898)
- Junior Fifth Rank (February 14, 1905)
- Senior Fifth Rank (February 21, 1910)
- Junior Fourth Rank (June 30, 1914)
- Senior Fourth Rank (July 31, 1919)
- Junior Third Rank (August 20, 1921)
- Senior Third Rank (March 24, 1924)
- Junior Second Rank (July 12, 1932)

== Awards ==
- Order of the Rising Sun, 6th Class (November 18, 1895)
- Order of the Rising Sun, 3rd Class (December 28, 1901)
- Order of the Golden Kite, 4th Class (April 1, 1906)
- One Shohai (February 16, 1910)
- Korean Annexation Commemorative Medal (August 1, 1912)
- Order of the Sacred Treasure, 2nd Class (November 30, 1914)
- Order of the Rising Sun, 1st Class (November 7, 1915)
- 1914–15 Military Service Medal (November 7, 1915)
- Emperor Taishō Enthronement Commemorative Medal (November 10, 1915)
- One Shohai (March 23, 1921)
- First National Census Commemorative Medal (July 1, 1921)
- One Shohai (July 12, 1932)

=== Foreign Awards ===
- France: Legion of Honor, Knight (April 4, 1901)
- Korea: Order of the Palgwae, 2nd class (September 26, 1906)
- United Kingdom: Honorary Commander of the Royal Victorian Order (July 20, 1907)
- United Kingdom: Honorary Knight Commander of the Order of the Bath (June 12, 1916)
- China: Order of the Precious Brilliant Golden Grain, 2nd class (December 6, 1918)
- France: Legion of Honor, Grand Officer (September 27, 1919)
- Italy: Knight Grand Cross of the Order of Saints Maurice and Lazarus (March 11, 1921)
- United States: Navy Distinguished Service Medal (March 11, 1921)
- United Kingdom: Knight Grand Cross of the Order of the British Empire (October 9, 1922)
