= Gengo Hyakutake =

- 百武 源吾
- Born: January 28, 1882; Honjō-mura, Saga, Japan
- Died: January 15, 1976 (aged 93); Hamamatsu, Shizuoka, Japan
- Education: Imperial Japanese Naval Academy; Naval Artillery School; Naval Staff College
- Relatives: Saburō Hyakutake (brother); Harukichi Hyakutake (brother)
- Military career
- Allegiance: Empire of Japan
- Branch: Imperial Japanese Navy
- Service years: 1902–1942
- Rank: Admiral
- Units: Itsukushima, Mikasa, Karasaki, Fuji, Katori, Takachiho, Ikoma, HMS Renown (1916), Imperial Japanese Navy General Staff
- Commands: Tama, Kasuga, Naval Operations Bureau, 5th Squadron, Vice-chief of Navy General Staff, Naval War College, Training Fleet, Maizuru Naval District, IJN 3rd Fleet, Sasebo Naval District, Naval Construction Bureau, Yokosuka Naval District, Naval Councillor
- Conflicts: Russo-Japanese War; Battle of the Yellow Sea; Battle of Tsushima
- Other work: Naval attaché, delegate

Gengo Hyakutake (百武 源吾, Hyakutake Gengo; January 28, 1882 – January 15, 1976) was a career officer and admiral in the Imperial Japanese Navy.

== Biography ==
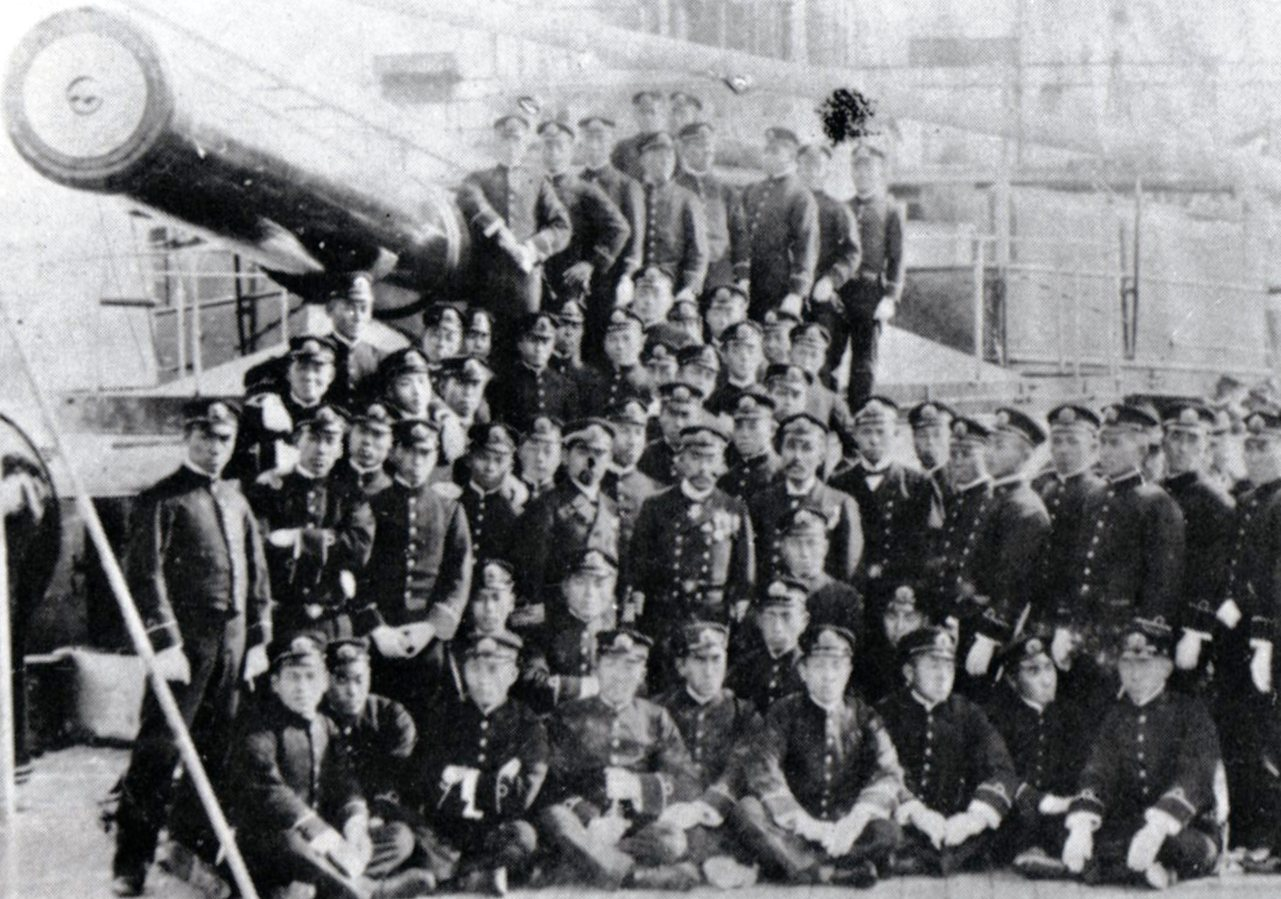
Candidate crew for "Japanese cruiser Itsukushima" during Training Fleet. The left end of the front row is Hyakutake, the senior candidate.

Born to a low-ranking samurai of Saga Domain, Hyakutake's elder brother Saburō Hyakutake was an admiral in the Imperial Japanese Navy, and his younger brother Harukichi Hyakutake was a general in the Imperial Japanese Army. Initially destined for a career in agriculture, he instead decided to follow his elder brother Kōji's desire for a naval career after Kōji's premature death due to illness.

Hyakutake graduated in the 30th class of the Imperial Japanese Naval Academy in 1902 and was appointed an ensign the following year. He served on the cruiser Itsukushima and the battleship Mikasa during the Russo-Japanese War of 1904-1905, and was on Mikasa during the Battle of the Yellow Sea. Afterwards, he was transferred to the submarine tender Karasaki, followed by the battleship Fuji, on which he participated in the Battle of Tsushima. He was promoted to sub-lieutenant in December 1905.

After the war, Hyakutake served on the cruiser Katori, on which he made a voyage to Great Britain. In September 1907, he was promoted to lieutenant. He graduated from Naval Artillery School the same year. After serving on Takachiho and Ikoma, he attended the Naval Staff College in 1910 and was promoted to lieutenant commander in December 1912. Hyakutake was subsequently sent to the United States from May 1915 through June 1917, and was promoted to the rank of commander in April 1917. On his return, he served as an instructor at the Naval Staff College through the end of 1921. In the period following the Russo-Japanese War, the Imperial Japanese Navy had increasingly looked towards the United States Navy as its "theoretical number one enemy" and had increasing promoted an anti-American stance in politics. Hyakutake spoke out strongly against this trend in his lectures at the Naval Staff College, emphasizing the importance of continued cooperation with the United States.

In December 1920, Hyakutake was promoted to captain, and in December 1921 was given command of the cruiser Tama. Tama was assigned as escort to HMS Renown (1916) during its visit with the Prince of Wales to Japan, and collided with a collier off Shimonoseki. Hyakutake transferred command to the cruiser Kasuga in March 1923, and joined the Imperial Japanese Navy General Staff in December of the same year.

In February 1925, Hyakutake was sent as a naval attaché to France and in June of the same year was part of Japan's delegation to the League of Nations. In December 1925, while in France, he was promoted to rear admiral, and returned to Japan in February 1926. On his return, he continued to teach at the Naval Staff College, continuing to promote the concepts of disarmament, external cooperation and negotiations and thus coming increasingly into conflict with the militaristic ultra-nationalism of General Sadao Araki and members of the Imperial Japanese Army's Imperial Way Faction. His relations with General Shigeru Honjō were so strained that Honjō refused to speak or meet with him. Hyakutake was promoted to vice admiral on December 1, 1930, and became Commandant of the Naval Staff College in 1932. In September 1933, he was transferred to become commander of the Maizuru Naval District and in November 1934 was commander-in-chief of the IJN 3rd Fleet. He became commander of the Sasebo Naval District in December 1935 and commander of the Yokosuka Naval District from December 1936. Promoted to full admiral on April 1, 1937, Hyakutake then became a Naval Councillor on April 26, 1938. He remained stubbornly steadfast in his opposition to war with the United States, and was forced into early retirement in July 1942. In March 1945, he briefly was president of Kyushu Imperial University.

After the war, Hyakutake moved to Inasa District, Shizuoka, where he took up farming. He died on January 15, 1976, at the age of 93.

== Notes ==
Military offices
Preceded by Takahashi Sankichi	Naval War College; Headmaster; 8 February 1932 - 1 October 1932	Post vacant; next held by Katō Takayoshi
Preceded by Imamura Nobujirō	Maizuru Guard District; Commander-in-chief; 15 September 1933 - 15 November 1934	Succeeded by Matsushita Hajime
Preceded by Imamura Shinjirō	3rd Fleet; Commander-in-chief; 15 November 1934 - 1 December 1935	Succeeded by Oikawa Koshirō
Preceded by Imamura Nobujirō	Sasebo Naval District; Commander-in-chief; 2 December 1935 - 16 March 1936	Succeeded by Matsushita Hajime
Preceded by Yonai Mitsumasa	Yokosuka Naval District; Commander-in-chief; 1 December 1936 - 25 April 1938	Succeeded by Hasegawa Kiyoshi
