= Shigetarō Shimada =

Japanese officer, war criminal 1883–1976

- 嶋田 繁太郎
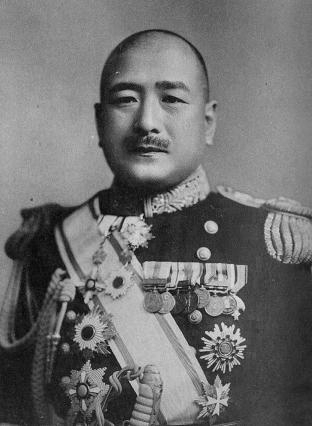

Chief of the Imperial Japanese Navy General Staff
- In office 21 February 1944 – 2 August 1944
- Prime Minister: Hideki Tōjō; Kuniaki Koiso
- Preceded by: Osami Nagano
- Succeeded by: Oikawa Koshirō

Minister of the Navy
- In office 18 October 1941 – 17 July 1944
- Prime Minister: Hideki Tōjō
- Preceded by: Oikawa Koshirō
- Succeeded by: Nomura Naokuni

Member of the Supreme War Council
- In office 2 August 1944 – 20 January 1945
- Monarch: Hirohito

Personal details
- Born: 24 September 1883 Asakusa, Tokyo, Japan
- Died: 7 June 1976 (aged 92) Meguro, Tokyo, Japan
- Awards: Order of the Golden Kite (2nd class), Order of the Sacred Treasures (1st class), Order of the Rising Sun (1st class)

Military service
- Allegiance: Empire of Japan
- Branch/service: Imperial Japanese Navy
- Years of service: 1904–1945
- Rank: Admiral
- Commands: Tama, Hiei; 7th Submarine Division, 3rd NGS Division Intelligence, 1st NGS Division Operations, Navy General Staff, IJN 2nd Fleet, China Area Fleet, Kure Naval District, Yokosuka Naval District, Navy Ministry
- Battles/wars: Russo-Japanese War; Battle of Tsushima; January 28 incident; Second Sino-Japanese War; World War II

Shigetarō Shimada (嶋田 繁太郎, Shimada Shigetarō; 24 September 1883 – 7 June 1976) was an admiral in the Imperial Japanese Navy during World War II. He also served as Minister of the Navy. He was convicted of waging aggressive war and sentenced to life imprisonment.

== Early life and education ==
A native of Tokyo, Shimada graduated from the 32nd class of the Imperial Japanese Naval Academy in 1904. He was ranked 27th out of 192 cadets. One of his classmates was the famous admiral Isoroku Yamamoto.

Shimada served his midshipman duty aboard the submarine tender Karasaki, and the cruiser Izumi, participating in the Battle of Tsushima during the Russo-Japanese War.

== Career ==
After his commissioning as an ensign on 31 August 1905, he was assigned to the cruisers Niitaka and Otowa, and was promoted to sub-lieutenant on 28 September 1907. After his promotion to lieutenant on 11 October 1909, he served on the battlecruiser Tsukuba and battleship Settsu.

After graduating with highest honors from the Naval War College in December 1915, Shimada was promoted to lieutenant commander on 13 December and assigned as an assistant naval attaché in Rome, Italy during World War I.

Returning to Japan after the war, Shimada held various staff positions in the 1920s as a staff officer in the Imperial Japanese Navy General Staff. He was promoted to commander on 1 December 1920 and assigned as executive officer of the battleship Hyūga in 1922, an instructor at the Naval War College in 1923 and commander of the 7th Submarine Division in 1926.

He was promoted to captain on 1 December 1924, and his first command was the cruiser Tama in 1928, followed by the battleship Hiei later the same year.

Shimada was promoted to rear admiral on 30 November 1929, and assigned as Chief of Staff to the IJN 2nd Fleet. After Shimada was transferred to IJN 1st Fleet in December 1930, he served as Commandant of the Submarine School, before being assigned to the IJN 3rd Fleet in February 1932. As commander of the IJN 3rd Fleet, he participated in the First Shanghai Incident of 1932.

Returning to the Imperial Japanese Navy General Staff as a senior staff officer in June 1932, he served as Chief of the Third Department, Naval Intelligence, where he started espionage operations against the US, and later served concurrently as Chief of the First Department from November 1932 to October 1933 when he assumed total command. Becoming Vice Chief of the Naval General Staff in December 1933, Shimada was promoted to vice admiral on 15 November 1934.

During the late-1930s Shimada's positions included commandant of the Kure Naval District, commander in chief of the IJN 2nd Fleet and China Area Fleet as well as commanding officer of the Yokosuka Naval District.

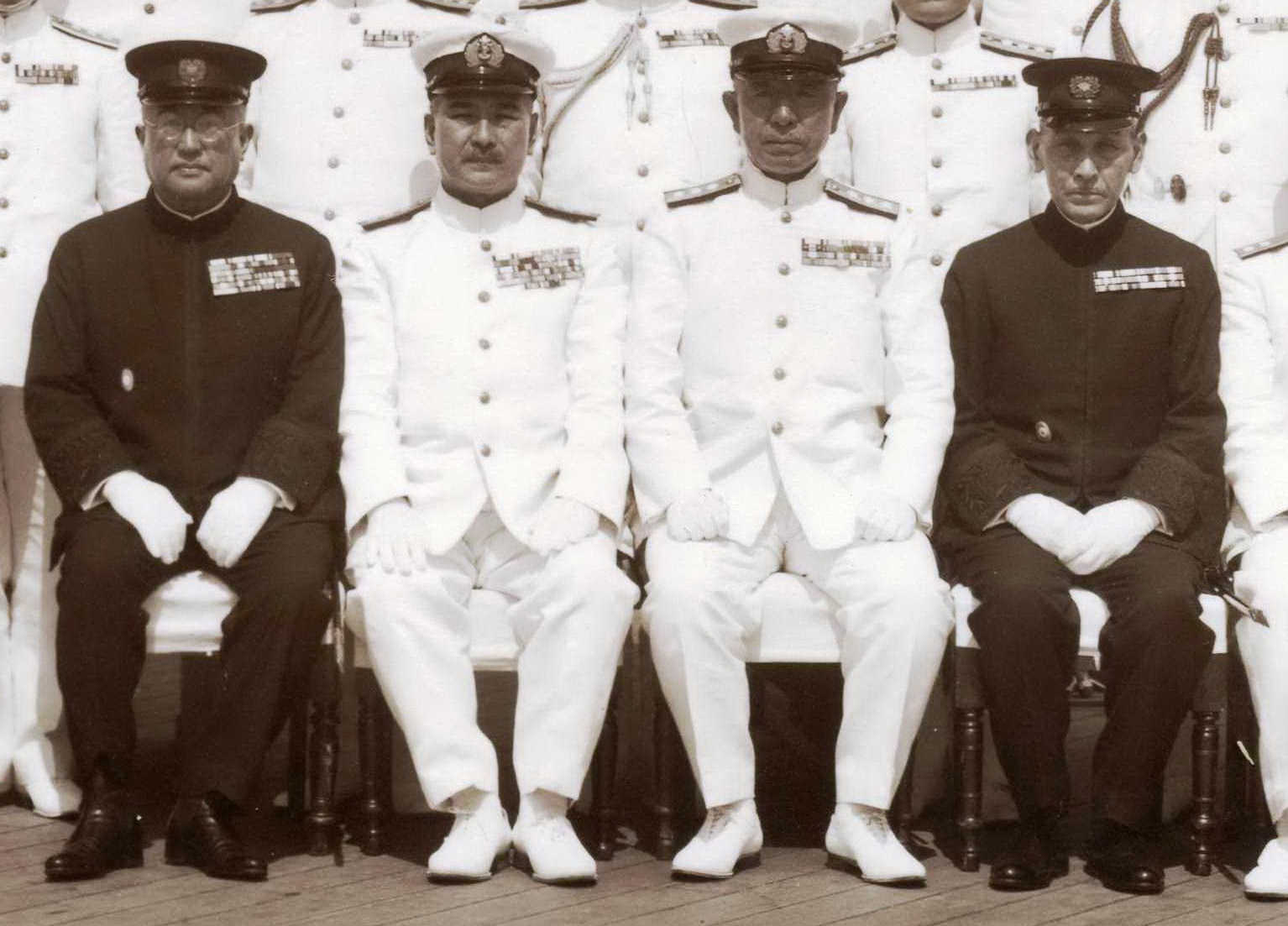
Tsuneo Matsudaira, Shigetarō Shimada, Mineichi Koga, and Saburō Hyakutake on the deck of the battleship Musashi, June 1943

Shimada was named Minister of the Navy on 18 October 1941. During his term as Navy Minister, he knew of the plans for the attack on Pearl Harbor and approved its implementation. Although largely regarded as a submissive lackey for his reputation of meek submissiveness and unquestioning loyalty to Prime Minister Hideki Tōjō (which created considerable unpopularity and criticism among his naval associates, who would refer to him as "Tōjō's Yurufun" ("Tōjō's Droopy Drawers"), Tōjō's "tea servant" or "briefcase carrier" behind his back), Shimada played an important role in working with Tōjō in coordinating military operations between the Army and Navy during the early years of the Pacific War.

On November 30, the Emperor Showa asked Shimada if he would really wage war. Shimada said, "We are ready, I do not trust Germany, I mentioned that Japan alone can continue the war."

After a series of major Japanese losses, Emperor Hirohito lost confidence in both the Army and Naval Chiefs of Staff. As such, Tōjō was able to dismiss Chief of the Army General Staff Hajime Sugiyama and Chief of the Naval General Staff Osami Nagano. Tōjō assumed the role of Army Chief of Staff while Shimada became Naval Chief of Staff on 21 February 1944, concurrent with his position as Naval Minister. This reorganization made Shimada supreme commander of the Imperial Japanese Navy.

Shimada's power grab, however, gained him many enemies in the Navy General Staff and the Emperor's court. Shimada's opponents continuously pressured Emperor Hirohito to dismiss him, citing that the navy was losing battle after battle under Shimada's direction. Hirohito finally made his displeasure with Shimada known to Tōjō in July 1944, shortly after the fall of Saipan. Tōjō immediately asked for Shimada's resignation, and replaced him as Navy Minister with Mitsumasa Yonai on 17 July and as Chief of the General Navy Staff on 2 August.

Although appointed to the Supreme War Council, Shimada retired from active duty on 20 January 1945 remaining in an advisory capacity for the remainder of the war.

== Later life and death ==
After the war, Shimada was arrested by the SCAP authorities and charged with war crimes. At the International Military Tribunal for the Far East, he was convicted and sentenced to life imprisonment for waging aggressive war against the United States, United Kingdom, China and the Netherlands. After the end of the American occupation of Japan, he was released on parole in 1955 by Prime Minister Ichirō Hatoyama. He died in 1976.

== Bibliography ==
- Bix, Herbert P (2001). Hirohito and the Making of Modern Japan. Harper Perennial. ISBN 0-06-093130-2.
- Costello, John (1965). The Pacific War. Harper Perennial. ISBN 0-688-01620-0.
- Drabkin, Ronald (2024). Beverly Hills Spy. William Morrow. ISBN 978-0063310070.
- Nishida, Hiroshi. "Imperial Japanese Navy".
- Parrish, Thomas (2001). S. L. A. Marshall (ed.). The Simon and Schuster Encyclopedia of World War II. New York: Simon and Schuster. ISBN.
- Toland, John (2003). The Rising Sun: The Decline and Fall of the Japanese Empire, 1936–1945. Modern Library. ISBN 0-8129-6858-1.

Military offices
Preceded by Shiozawa Kōichi	2nd Fleet; Chief-of-staff; 1 December 1929 – 1 December 1930	Succeeded by Komaki Wasuke
Preceded by Shiozawa Kōichi	Combined Fleet & 1st Fleet; Chief-of-staff; 1 December 1930 - 1 December 1931	Succeeded by Yoshida Zengo
Fleet recreated	3rd Fleet; Chief-of-staff; 2 February 1932 - 28 June 1932	Succeeded by Kikuno Shigeru
Preceded by Yoshida Zengo	2nd Fleet; Commander-in-chief; 1 December 1937 - 15 November 1938	Succeeded by Toyoda Soemu
Preceded by Katō Takayoshi	Kure Naval District; Commander-in-chief; 15 November 1938 – 15 April 1940	Succeeded by Hibino Masaharu
Preceded by Oikawa Koshirō	China Area Fleet; Commander-in-chief; 1 May 1940 - 1 September 1941	Succeeded by Koga Mineichi
Preceded by Shiozawa Kōichi	Yokosuka Naval District; Commander-in-chief; 10 September 1941 - 18 October 1941	Succeeded by Hirata Noboru
Political offices
Preceded by Oikawa Koshirō	Minister of the Navy; 18 October 1941 – 17 July 1944	Succeeded by Nomura Naokuni
Military offices
Preceded by Nagano Osami	Navy General Staff; Chairman; 21 February 1944 – 2 August 1944	Succeeded by Oikawa Koshirō
