= Gosei =

Gosei may refer to:

- Gosei (competition) (碁聖), a Go competition in Japan, a "best of five" contest
- Gosei (fifth-generation Nikkei) (五世), term describing fifth-generation descendants of emigrants from Japan
- Gosei (meditation) (五省), five questions for self-reflection in daily life, traditional at Japan's Naval Academy
- Gosei (megaforce) (Gosei), a character from the TV show Power Rangers Megaforce and Power Rangers Super Megaforce

== See also ==
- Goseibai Shikimoku, the legal code of the Kamakura shogunate in Japan, in 1232
- Gosei Sentai Dairanger, a Japanese tokusatsu television series, 1993-94
