= Kiyokazu Abo =

Imperial Japanese Navy admiral

Baron Kiyokazu Abo
- 安保 清種
- Abo in 1930

Minister of the Navy
- In office 3 October 1930 – 13 December 1931
- Prime Minister: Osachi Hamaguchi; Wakatsuki Reijirō
- Preceded by: Takarabe Takeshi
- Succeeded by: Ōsumi Mineo

Member of the House of Peers
- In office 28 July 1934 – 12 April 1946

Member of the Supreme War Council
- In office 13 December 1931 – 1 June 1933
- Monarch: Hirohito
- In office 16 May 1928 – 3 October 1930
- Monarch: Hirohito
- In office 10 December 1926 – 20 April 1927
- Monarchs: Taishō; Hirohito

Personal details
- Born: 15 October 1870 Saga Prefecture, Japan
- Died: 8 June 1948 (aged 77) Suginami, Tokyo, Japan
- Resting place: Aoyama Cemetery

Military service
- Allegiance: Empire of Japan
- Branch/service: Imperial Japanese Navy
- Years of service: 1891–1934
- Rank: Admiral
- Commands: Akitsushima, Aki; Kure Naval District; Yokosuka Naval District.
- Battles/wars: First Sino-Japanese War; Russo-Japanese War; Battle of Port Arthur; Battle of the Yellow Sea; Battle of Tsushima; World War I

Baron Kiyokazu Abo (安保 清種, Abo Kiyokazu; 15 October 1870 – 8 June 1948) was an admiral in the Imperial Japanese Navy, who served as Navy Minister in the early 1930s.

== Biography ==
Abo was born in Saga Prefecture as Sawano Yasusaburō, where his father was the commandant of the military academy where he went to school. His father died when he was still young, but the deputy commandant, Abo Kiyoyasu, took notice of young Abo and adopted him into his household on the condition that he marry his daughter.

As Kiyokazu Abo, he graduated from the 18th class of the Imperial Japanese Naval Academy, ranked 11th out of 61 cadets. He served his midshipman tour on the corvettes Hiei, Jingei, cruisers Matsushima and Takao. After commissioning to ensign, he was assigned back to Takao, followed by cruiser Itsukushima and the gunboat Banjō during the First Sino-Japanese War (1894–95). After the end of the war, he was assigned to the cruiser Izumi.

Promoted to lieutenant in 1897, he continued to serve on Izumi, becoming chief navigator in 1898. He then served on the cruisers Akashi and Izumo, battleship Asahi and as chief gunnery officer on the cruiser Suma. In 1903, he was promoted to lieutenant commander, and reassigned as chief gunnery officer to the cruiser Yakumo, followed by the battleship Mikasa, during which time he saw combat in the Russo-Japanese War at the naval Battle of Port Arthur, Battle of the Yellow Sea, and the final decisive Battle of Tsushima. During the Russo-Japanese War, he became famous for coining nicknames for each of the ships in the Russian fleet, to make identification and transmission of orders to the Japanese gunnery crews more understandable.

After the war, he was assigned as naval attaché to the United Kingdom from November 1905 to February 1908. During his time overseas, he was promoted to commander. On his return, he instructed at the Naval Staff College, and in 1909 succeeded to the title of danshaku (baron) under the kazoku peerage system on the death of his foster father.

Abo in 1913

In 1910, Abo received his first command: the cruiser Akitsushima. Promoted to captain in December 1911, he was appointed chief of staff of the 2nd Fleet until December 1912. After spending three months on the Navy General Staff, he was again sent to England as naval attaché from March 1913 to April 1915. On his return, he assumed command of the battleship Aki.

In December 1916, Abo was promoted to rear admiral and became chief of the first section of the Imperial Japanese Navy General Staff. In December 1920, he was promoted to vice admiral and became Vice Chief of the Imperial Navy General Staff, where he assisted Admiral Yamashita Gentarō in the implementation of the Washington Naval Treaty.

Abo was Japan's naval delegate to the League of Nations from 1922–1923, He served as Director of Naval Shipbuilding Command in 1923, and as Vice Minister of the Navy in 1924. In April 1925, he was appointed commander in chief of the Kure Naval District.

On his promotion to admiral on 1 April 1927, Abo became commander in chief of the Yokosuka Naval District. He subsequently served on the Supreme War Council and as part of Japan's delegation to the London Naval Treaty Conference in 1929.

From 3 October 1930 to 13 December 1931, Abo served as Naval Minister in the cabinets of Prime Minister Wakatsuki Reijirō and Hamaguchi Osachi.

Abo was a political moderate and a leading supporter of the Treaty Faction within the Imperial Japanese Navy, and hoped for a revival of the Anglo-Japanese Alliance through diplomacy.

During his term in office, the military was embroiled with the chain of command controversy as to whether or not the Imperial Japanese Army and Imperial Japanese Navy were answerable to the elected Diet of Japan and Prime Minister, or were answerable only directly to the Emperor of Japan.

Abo went into the reserves in 1934, and retired in 1940.

Military offices
Preceded by Yoshida Kiyokaze	2nd Fleet; Chief-of-staff; 5 December 1911 – 1 December 1912	Succeeded by Yoshida Kiyokaze
Political offices
Preceded by Okada Keisuke	Vice-Minister of the Navy; 11 June 1924 - 15 April 1925	Succeeded by Ōsumi Mineo
Military offices
Preceded by Takeshita Isamu	Kure Naval District; Commander-in-chief; 15 April 1925 – 10 December 1926	Succeeded by Taniguchi Naomi
Preceded by Okada Keisuke	Yokosuka Naval District; Commander-in-chief; 20 April 1927 – 16 May 1928	Succeeded by Yoshikawa Yoshihira
Political offices
Preceded by Takarabe Takeshi	Minister of the Navy; 3 October 1930 – 13 December 1931	Succeeded by Ōsumi Mineo
