= Training Fleet (Imperial Japanese Navy) =

The Training Fleet (練習艦隊, Renshū Kantai) was a training unit of the Imperial Japanese Navy. Organized after the Russo-Japanese War, however, systematized in 1902 by the Training Detachment (練習枝隊, Renshū Shitai) in the Standing Fleet. This article handles Training Fleet and Training Detachment.

== Organizations of the Training Detachment ==
Term	Commander	Vessels	Destinations
2 November 1902 – 21 August 1903	Rear-Admiral Hikonojō Kamimura	Cruiser Matsushima, Itsukushima, Hashidate	Southeast Asia, Australia
17 December 1903 – 3 January 1904	Rear-Admiral Masamichi Tōgō	Cruiser Matsushima, Itsukushima, Hashidate	Cruise was canceled and detachment was dissolved in halfway for war preparations.

== Organizations of the Training Fleet ==
Term	Commander	Vessels	Destinations
15 February 1906 – 25 August 1906	Rear-Admiral Hayao Shimamura	Cruiser Matsushima, Itsukushima, Hashidate	Australia, Southeast Asia
31 January 1907 – 3 August 1907	Rear-Admiral Sadayasu Tomioka	Cruiser Matsushima, Itsukushima, Hashidate	Hawaiian Islands, Australia, Southeast Asia
25 January 1908 – 30 April 1908	Rear-Admiral Motarō Yoshimatsu	Cruiser Matsushima, Itsukushima, Hashidate	Southeast Asia; cruise was canceled in halfway, because Matsushima was sunk in Magong.
14 March 1909 – 7 August 1909	Rear-Admiral Hikojirō Ijichi	Cruiser Aso, Sōya	Hawaiian Islands, North America
1 February 1910 – 3 July 1910	Rear-Admiral Hikojirō Ijichi	Cruiser Aso, Sōya	Australia, Southeast Asia
16 October 1910 – 6 March 1911	Rear-Admiral Rokurō Yashiro	Cruiser Asama, Kasagi	Hawaiian Islands, North America, Central America
25 November 1911 – 28 March 1912	Vice-Admiral Sadakichi Katō	Cruiser Aso, Sōya	Southeast Asia
5 December 1912 – 21 April 1913	Rear-Admiral Sōjirō Tochiuchi	Cruiser Azuma, Sōya	Southeast Asia, Australia
20 April 1914 – 11 August 1914	Rear-Admiral Teijirō Kuroi	Cruiser Azuma, Asama	Hawaiian Islands, North America
20 April 1915 – 23 August 1915	Rear-Admiral Tomojirō Chisaka	Cruiser Aso, Sōya	Southeast Asia, Australia
20 April 1916 – 22 August 1916	Rear-Admiral Tatsuo Matsumura	Cruiser Iwate, Azuma	Southeast Asia, Australia
5 April 1917 – 17 August 1917	Rear-Admiral Toshitake Iwamura	Cruiser Tokiwa, Yakumo	North America (West coast), Hawaiian Islands, South Pacific
2 March 1918 – 6 July 1918	Vice-Admiral Kantarō Suzuki	Cruiser Iwate, Asama	North America (West coast), Central America (West coast), Hawaiian Islands, South Pacific
1 March 1919 – 26 July 1919	Vice-Admiral Naoe Nakano	Cruiser Tokiwa, Azuma	Southeast Asia, Australia
21 August 1920 – 2 April 1921	Vice-Admiral Kajishirō Funakoshi	Cruiser Asama, Iwate	South America, Southern Africa
20 August 1921 – 4 April 1922	Vice-Admiral Hanroku Saitō	Cruiser Yakumo, Izumo	Europe
26 June 1922 – 8 February 1923	Vice-Admiral Naomi Taniguchi	Coast defence ship Iwate, Izumo, Asama	South America, Southern Africa
7 November 1923 – 5 April 1924	Vice-Admiral Shichigorō Saitō	Coast defence ship Iwate, Izumo, Asama	Southeast Asia, Australia
10 November 1924 – 4 April 1925	Vice-Admiral Saburō Hyakutake	Coast defence ship Yakumo, Asama, Izumo	North America (West coast)
10 November 1925 – 6 April 1926	Vice-Admiral Saburō Hyakutake	Coast defence ship Iwate	Southeast Asia, Australia
30 June 1926 – 17 January 1927	Vice-Admiral Eisuke Yamamoto	Coast defence ship Yakumo, Izumo	Mediterranean Sea
30 June 1927 – 16 December 1927	Vice-Admiral Osami Nagano	Coast defence ship Iwate, Asama	North America (East coast)
23 April 1928 – 3 October 1928	Vice-Admiral Seizō Kobayashi	Coast defence ship Yakumo, Izumo	Southeast Asia, Australia
1 July 1929 – 27 December 1929	Vice-Admiral Kichisaburō Nomura	Coast defence ship Iwate, Asama	North America (East coast)
5 March 1931 – 15 August 1931	Vice-Admiral Seizō Sakonji	Coast defence ship Yakumo, Izumo	Mediterranean Sea
1 March 1932 – 14 July 1932	Vice-Admiral Shinjirō Imamura	Coast defence ship Iwate, Asama	Southeast Asia, Australia
6 March 1933 – 26 July 1933	Vice-Admiral Gengo Hyakutake	Coast defence ship Iwate, Yakumo	North America (West coast), Central America (West coast)
15 February 1934 – 26 July 1934	Vice-Admiral Hajime Matsushita	Coast defence ship Iwate, Asama	Mediterranean Sea
20 February 1935 – 22 July 1935	Vice-Admiral Kamezaburō Nakamura	Coast defence ship Asama, Yakumo	Southeast Asia, Australia, Hawaiian Islands
9 June 1936 – 20 November 1936	Vice-Admiral Zengo Yoshida	Coast defence ship Yakumo, Iwate	North America (East coast)
7 June 1937 – 19 October 1937	Vice-Admiral Mineichi Koga	Coast defence ship Yakumo, Iwate	Mediterranean Sea
6 April 1938 – 29 June 1938	Rear-Admiral Shirō Takasu	Coast defence ship Yakumo, Iwate	Southeast Asia, South Pacific
16 November 1938 – 30 January 1939	Vice-Admiral Umatarō Tanimoto	Coast defence ship Yakumo, Iwate	Southeast Asia
4 October 1939 – 20 November 1939	Vice-Admiral Yorio Sawamoto	Coast defence ship Yakumo, Iwate	Hawaiian Islands, South Pacific
7 August 1940 – 28 September 1940	Vice-Admiral Mitsumi Shimizu	Cruiser Katori, Kashima	Sea of Japan, East China Sea

== Bibliography ==
- Monthly Ships of the World, "Kaijinsha". (Japan)
  - No. 441, Special issue Vol. 32, "Japanese cruisers", September 1991
  - No. 500, Special issue Vol. 44, "Ships of the Imperial Japanese Navy", August 1995
  - No. 754, Special issue Vol. 101, "History of Japanese cruisers", January 2012
- The Maru Special, "Ushio Shobō". (Japan)
  - Japanese Naval Vessels No. 44, "Cruiser Tone-class and Katori-class", October 1980
  - Japanese Naval Vessels No. 53, "Japanese support vessels", July 1981
- Rekishi Dokuhon, Special issue No. 33 Overview of admirals of the Imperial Japanese Navy, Shin-Jinbutsuōraisha, October 1999
- The Japanese Modern Historical Manuscripts Association, Organizations, structures and personnel affairs of the Imperial Japanese Army & Navy, University of Tokyo Press, January 1971 ISBN 978-4-13-036009-8
