= Chinkai Guard District =

Japanese colonial navy base in Korea

The Chinkai Guard District (鎮海警備府, Chinkai Keibifu) was the major navy base for the Imperial Japanese Navy in Korea under Japanese rule before and during World War II. Located in southern Korea (at present-day Jinhae, South Korea, 35°11′N 128°34′E), the Chinkai Guard District was responsible for control of the strategic Straits of Shimonoseki and for patrols along the Korean coastline and in the Sea of Japan.

== History ==
The Guard Districts (警備府, Keibifu) were naval bases, similar to the Naval Districts (鎮守府), with docking, fueling and resupply facilities, but typically lacked a shipyard or training school. They tended to be established by strategic waterways or major port cities for defensive purposes. In concept, the Guard District was similar to the United States Navy Sea Frontiers concept. the Guard District maintained a garrison force of ships and Naval Land Forces which reported directly to the Guard District commander, and hosted detachments of the numbered fleets on a temporary assignment basis.

The port of Chinkai in Korea was an area with long associations with Japan, having been the location of a Japanese fish trading settlement in the 15th and 16th centuries. More recently, it was the location where Admiral Tōgō Heihachirō assembled his Combined Fleet while waiting for the arrival of the Russian Baltic Fleet prior to the Battle of Tsushima in the Russo-Japanese War.

After the annexation of Korea by the Empire of Japan in 1910, the Imperial Japanese Navy built extensive port facilities, transforming the small town into a major naval port. The port was upgraded to a Guard District on April 1, 1916. After the Russo-Japanese War the port was briefly considered a backwater assignment. However, the start of the Second Sino-Japanese War in 1937 re-established Jinhae as Japanese Empire's strategic port on mainland Asia. At the start of the Pacific War, Chinkai was home to destroyers Minekaze, Asagao, Fuyo, and Karukaya; Minesweeper Divisions 48 and 49; as well as Chinkai Naval Air Group. On the surrender of Japan, Chinkai was occupied by Destroyer Squadron 64 from the United States Navy led by the USS Harry E. Hubbard (DD-748). It was repaired and continued to be used as a naval base during the Korean War. After the independence of Korea in 1945, the naval base was turned over to the Republic of Korea Navy, and remains a major naval base to this date.

A subsidiary naval base reporting to the Chinkai Guard District existed at Rashin (present day Rason, North Korea), 42°20′02″N 130°23′56″E, on the east coast of Korea near the border with the Soviet Union.

== Order of battle at time of the attack on Pearl Harbor ==
- Chinkai Guard District (Admiral Ikuta Sakamoto)
  - Japanese destroyer Minekaze
  - AP Ryotaku Maru
- Chinkai Air Group
  - 6 × Kawanishi E7K Alf
- Chinkai Guard Force
  - Destroyer Division 32 (Admiral Owada)
    - Japanese destroyer Asagao
    - Japanese destroyer Fuyo
    - Japanese destroyer Karukaya
  - Minesweeper Division 48
  - Minesweeper Division 49
  - Rashin Base Force (Admiral Sukigara)

== List of Commanders ==
=== Commanding Officer ===
- Vice-Admiral Kujuro Yamaguchi (1 Apr 1916 – 1 Dec 1916)
- Vice-Admiral Kichitaro Togo (1 Dec 1916 – 1 Dec 1918)
- Vice-Admiral Hiromi Tadokoro (1 Dec 1918 – 1 Dec 1919)
- Vice-Admiral Tomojiro Chisaka (1 Dec 1919 – 1 Dec 1920)
- Vice-Admiral Kazuyoshi Yamaji (1 Dec 1920 – 1 Dec 1922)
- Admiral Saburo Hyakutake (1 Dec 1922 – 1 Jun 1923)
- Vice-Admiral Shozo Kuwashima (1 Jun 1923 – 5 Feb 1924)
- Vice-Admiral Kikuo Matsumura (5 Feb 1924 – 15 Apr 1925)
- Vice-Admiral Taro Inutsuka (15 Apr 1925 – 1 Dec 1926)
- Vice-Admiral Naotaro Nagasawa (1 Dec 1926 – 1 Dec 1927)
- Vice-Admiral Junichi Kiyokawa (1 Dec 1927 – 1 Jul 1929)
- Vice-Admiral Kanjiro Hara (1 Jul 1929 – 1 Dec 1930)
- Admiral Mitsumasa Yonai (1 Dec 1930 – 1 Dec 1932)
- Admiral Koichi Shiozawa (1 Dec 1932 – 17 Jan 1934)
- Vice-Admiral Hisao Ichimura (17 Jan 1934 – 15 Nov 1934)
- Vice-Admiral Seizaburo Kobayashi (15 Nov 1934 – 16 Mar 1936)
- Vice-Admiral Tsugumatsu Inoue (16 Mar 1936 – 1 Dec 1936)
- Vice-Admiral Keitaro Hara (1 Dec 1936 – 1 Dec 1937)
- Vice-Admiral Jugoro Arichi (1 Dec 1937 – 15 Nov 1938)
- Vice-Admiral Sonosuke Kobayashi (15 Nov 1938 – 15 Apr 1940)
- Admiral Nishizo Tsukahara (15 Apr 1940 – 1 Sep 1941)
- Vice-Admiral Ikuta Sakamoto (1 Sep 1941 – 15 Sep 1942)
- Vice-Admiral Eiji Goto (15 Sep 1942 – 9 Sep 1944)
- Vice-Admiral Takazumi Oka (9 Sep 1944 – 20 Apr 1945)
- Vice-Admiral Gisaburo Yamaguchi (20 Apr 1945 – Sep 1945)

=== Chief of Staff ===
- Rear-Admiral Tsuneha Sano (4 Apr 1916 – 1 Dec 1917)
- Rear-Admiral Heigo Teraoka (1 Dec 1917 – 26 May 1919)
- Rear-Admiral Yasuzo Torisaki (15 Jun 1921 – 10 Nov 1922)
- Rear-Admiral Chikateru Takasaki (10 Nov 1922 – 1 Dec 1924)
- Rear-Admiral Naojiro Honshuku (1 Dec 1924 – 1 Dec 1926)
- Rear-Admiral Sunao Matsuzaki (1 Dec 1926 – 10 Dec 1928)
- Rear-Admiral Kentaro Kojima (15 Nov 1930 – 15 Nov 1932)
- Vice-Admiral Yoshinobu Shishido (15 Nov 1932 – 1 Nov 1934)
- Rear-Admiral Kohei Ochi (1 Nov 1934 – 1 Dec 1936)
- Rear-Admiral Junichi Mizuno (1 Dec 1936 – 1 Dec 1937)
- Vice-Admiral Sadaichi Matsunaga (1 Dec 1937 – 15 Nov 1939)
- Vice-Admiral Tamotsu Takama (15 Nov 1939 – 15 Nov 1940)
- Rear-Admiral Shigeki Ando (15 Nov 1940 – 25 Feb 1942)
- Rear-Admiral Keiichi Onishi (25 Feb 1942 – 25 Jun 1943)
- Rear-Admiral Katsuya Sato (25 Jun 1943 – 15 Aug 1944)
- Rear-Admiral Chitoshi Ishizuka (15 Aug 1944 – 15 Apr 1945)
- Rear-Admiral Haruo Katsuta (15 Apr 1945 – 29 Nov 1945)
