= Maizuru Naval District =

Maizuru Naval District (舞鶴鎮守府, Maizuru chinjufu) was one of four main administrative districts of the pre-war Imperial Japanese Navy. Its territory included the entire Sea of Japan coastline from northern Kyūshū to western Hokkaidō.

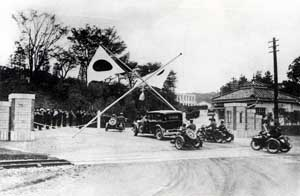
Emperor Hirohito visits Maizuru Naval District HQ, 1933

== History ==
The strategic importance of the location of Maizuru and its potential for development into a military port for operations in the Sea of Japan towards Korea, Russia and even China was recognized early by the Imperial Japanese Navy. During the administrative re-organization of the navy in 1889, Maizuru was designated as the headquarters of the Fourth Naval District (第四海軍区, dai-yon kaigunku), and its harbor was dredged, a breakwater constructed and docking facilities for warships established.

With the First Sino-Japanese War, the port was fortified with the addition of heavy coastal artillery. However, the naval bases at Sasebo and Kure were geographically more convenient for the navy during the war, and received the bulk of the navy's attention and funding. Although naval repair facilities and shipyards Maizuru Naval Arsenal were opened in 1903, the mountainous terrain around Maizuru port proved an impediment to expansion, and the area languished as somewhat of a backwater. This continued even through the Russo-Japanese War, despite Maizuru's more convenient location to the center of that conflict. In the post-war period, with Korea in Japanese hands, and the threats from Russia and China very much diminished, there were discussions about closing the military port. Although Maizuru was one of the largest military shipyards in Japan (specializing in destroyer construction), the Washington Naval Treaty of 1923 also considerably reduced the demand for warship construction, and its facilities were largely mothballed until 1936.

With the Pacific War, Maizuru was reactivated as a recruiting, training, and logistical support district. It was also a base for one of Japan's Special Naval Landing Forces, and a Naval Air Station. Maizuru was also the location of the Imperial Japanese Navy Engineering Academy.

The area today is occupied in part by facilities of the Japanese Maritime Self-Defense Force, which has preserved a portion of the original red-brick gates and a couple of buildings as commemorative museums.

== List of commanders ==
=== Commanding Officers ===
No.	Name	Portrait	Rank	Term of Office	
No.	Name	Portrait	Rank	Start	End
1	Tōgō Heihachirō		Vice Admiral	1 October 1901	19 October 1903
2	Hidaka Sōnojō		Vice Admiral Admiral (after 7 August 1908)	19 October 1903	28 August 1908
3	Kataoka Shichirō		Vice Admiral Admiral (after 1 December 1910)	28 August 1908	18 January 1911
4	Misu Sotarō		Vice Admiral	18 January 1911	25 September 1913
5	Yashiro Rokurō		Vice Admiral	25 September 1913	17 April 1914
6	Sakamoto Hajime		Vice Admiral	17 April 1914	13 December 1915
7	Nawa Matahachirō		Vice Admiral	13 December 1915	1 December 1917
8	Takarabe Takeshi		Vice Admiral	1 December 1917	1 December 1918
9	Nomaguchi Kaneo		Vice Admiral	1 December 1918	1 December 1919
10	Kuroi Teijirō		Vice Admiral	1 December 1919	16 August 1920
11	Satō Tetsutarō		Vice Admiral	16 August 1920	1 December 1921
12	Oguri Kozaburō		Vice Admiral	1 December 1921	1 April 1923
13	Saitō Hanroku		Vice Admiral	1 April 1923	1 June 1923
14	Hyakutake Saburō		Vice Admiral	1 June 1923	4 October 1924
15	Nakazato Shigeji		Vice Admiral	4 October 1924	1 June 1925
16	Furukawa Shinzaburō		Vice Admiral	1 June 1925	10 December 1926
17	Ōtani Koshirō		Vice Admiral	10 December 1926	16 May 1928
18	Iida Nobutarō		Vice Admiral	16 May 1928	10 December 1928
19	Tosu Tamaki		Vice Admiral	10 December 1928	11 November 1929
20	Kiyokawa Junichi		Vice Admiral	11 November 1929	1 December 1930
21	Suetsugu Nobumasa		Vice Admiral	1 December 1930	1 December 1931
22	Ōminato Naotarō		Vice Admiral	1 December 1931	1 December 1932
23	Imamura Nobujirō		Vice Admiral	1 December 1932	15 September 1933
24	Hyakutake Gengo		Vice Admiral	15 September 1933	15 November 1934
25	Matsushita Hajime		Vice Admiral	15 November 1934	2 December 1935
26	Shiozawa Kōichi		Vice Admiral	2 December 1935	1 December 1936
27	Nakamura Kamezaburō		Vice Admiral	1 December 1936	1 December 1937
28	Idemitsu Manbee		Vice Admiral	1 December 1937	15 November 1938
29	Katagiri Eikichi		Vice Admiral	15 November 1938	15 November 1939
30	Hara Gorō		Vice Admiral	15 November 1938	15 April 1940
31	Kobayashi Sōnosuke		Vice Admiral	15 April 1940	14 July 1942
32	Niimi Masaichi		Vice Admiral	14 July 1942	1 December 1943
33	Ōkawachi Denshichi		Vice Admiral	1 December 1943	1 April 1944
34	Makita Kakusaburō		Vice Admiral	1 April 1944	1 March 1945
35	Tayui Minoru		Vice Admiral	1 March 1945	30 November 1945

=== Chief of Staff ===
- Vice-Admiral Baron Tokutarō Nakamizo (1 October 1901 – 12 March 1902)
- Rear-Admiral Ichirō Nijima (12 March 1902 – 10 May 1905)
- Rear-Admiral Shinjirō Uehara (10 May 1905 – 7 April 1906)
- Rear-Admiral Arinobu Matsumoto (7 April 1906 – 22 November 1906)
- Vice-Admiral Suetaka Ijichi (22 November 1906 – 15 May 1908)
- Admiral Baron Sadakichi Katō (15 May 1908 – 9 April 1910)
- Vice-Admiral Kensuke Wada (9 April 1910 – 1 December 1911)
- Rear-Admiral Juzaburo Ushida (1 December 1911 – 1 December 1912)
- Rear-Admiral Seinosuke Tōgō (1 December 1912 – 1 April 1913)
- Vice-Admiral Tomojirō Chisaka (1 April 1913 – 1 December 1913)
- Vice-Admiral Yasujirō Nagata (1 December 1913 – 1 December 1914)
- Rear-Admiral Eitarō Kataoka (1 December 1914 – 1 April 1915)
- Rear-Admiral Tokutarō Hiraga (1 April 1915 – 1 April 1916)
- Rear-Admiral Yushichi Kanno (1 April 1916 – 1 December 1917)
- Rear-Admiral Masaki Nakamura (1 December 1917 – 25 September 1918)
- Vice-Admiral Kenzo Kobayashi (25 September 1918 – 10 November 1918)
- Rear-Admiral Hisamori Taguchi (10 November 1918 – 10 November 1920)
- Vice-Admiral Kosaburō Uchida (10 November 1920 – 1 December 1922)
- Vice-Admiral Yukichi Shima (1 December 1922 – 1 December 1923)
- Rear-Admiral Tanin Ikeda (1 December 1923 – 1 December 1924)
- Admiral Zengo Yoshida (1 December 1924 – 15 April 1925)
- Vice-Admiral Shigeru Matsuyama (20 November 1925 – 1 December 1926)
- Rear-Admiral Shiba Shibayama (1 December 1926 – 10 December 1928)
- Vice-Admiral Yutaka Arima (10 December 1928 – 1 May 1929)
- Vice-Admiral Shigeru Kokuno (1 May 1929 – 1 November 1930)
- Vice-Admiral Umatarō Tanimoto (1 November 1930 – 1 December 1931)
- Rear-Admiral Fuchina Iwaihara (1 December 1931 – 15 November 1933)
- Rear-Admiral Shigekazu Nakamura (15 November 1933 – 16 November 1936)
- Vice-Admiral Ichirō Ono (16 November 1936 – 25 September 1937)
- Vice-Admiral Kanji Ugaki (25 September 1937 – 22 October 1938)
- Vice-Admiral Morikazu Osugi (22 October 1938 – 15 November 1939)
- Vice-Admiral Kiyohide Shima (15 November 1939 – 15 October 1940)
- Vice-Admiral Naomasa Sakonjō (15 October 1940 – 11 August 1941)
- Rear-Admiral Kiyoshi Hamada (11 August 1941 – 10 June 1942)
- Rear-Admiral Sokichi Takagi (10 June 1942 – 25 September 1943)
- Rear-Admiral Akira Sone (25 September 1943 – 11 September 1944)
- Rear-Admiral Shinichi Torigoe (25 September 1944 – Sep 1945)
