= Mineichi Koga =

Japanese admiral (1885–1944)

- 古賀 峯一
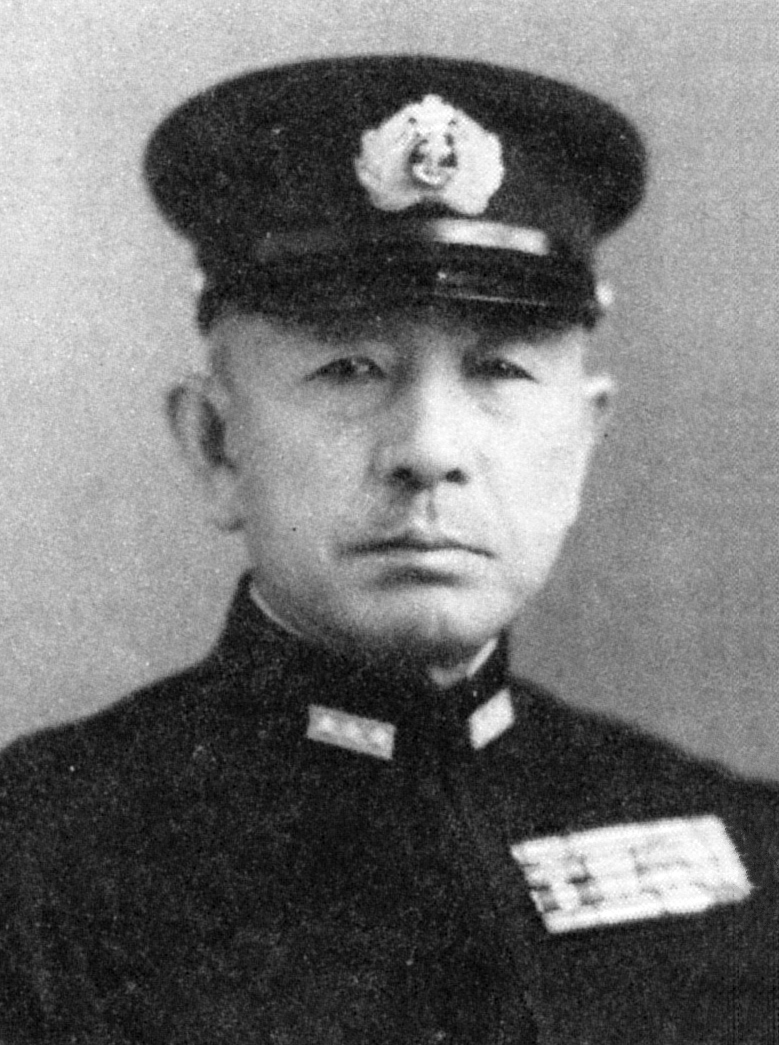
- Born: September 25, 1885; Arita, Saga, Japan
- Died: March 31, 1944 (aged 58) near Davao, Second Philippine Republic
- Military career
- Allegiance: Empire of Japan
- Branch: Imperial Japanese Navy
- Service years: 1906–1944
- Rank: Marshal Admiral (posthumous)
- Commands: Aoba, Ise, Naval Intelligence Bureau, Weapons and Mobilization Bureau, 7th Squadron, Training Fleet, Vice-chief of Navy General Staff, 2nd Fleet, China Area Fleet, Yokosuka Naval District, Combined Fleet
- Conflicts: Second Sino-Japanese War; World War II; Pacific War; Battle of Hong Kong
- Awards: Order of the Sacred Treasures, 1st class Order of the Rising Sun, 1st class Order of the Golden Kite, 1st class Knight's Cross of the Iron Cross

Mineichi Koga (古賀 峯一, Koga Mineichi; 25 September 1885 – 31 March 1944) was a Japanese Marshal Admiral and commander-in-chief of the Imperial Japanese Navy's Combined Fleet.

== Biography ==
=== Early life and career ===
Koga was born in the ceramics center of Arita in Nishimatsuura County of Saga Prefecture in 1885. He entered the 34th class of the Imperial Japanese Naval Academy and graduated in 1906, ranked 14th of 176 cadets.

He served as midshipman on the cruiser Matsushima on its long-distance navigational training cruise to Honolulu, Hilo, Wellington, Brisbane, Palm Island, Queensland, Batavia, Singapore, Mako, Qingdao, Port Arthur, Dairen, Chemulpo, Chinkai, Busan and Kagoshima. On his return, he was commissioned as ensign and assigned to the Katori, followed by Otowa and Suma.

As a sub-lieutenant he served on the Soya and Aki, and as lieutenant from 1911, he served on Kashima.

After further attendance at Japan's Naval War College, Koga held shore staff posting following his graduation and promotion to lieutenant commander in 1917. In 1920, having seen no action during World War I, Koga became a resident officer in France. He returned in 1922 to become executive officer on the Kitakami. On his promotion to captain on December 1, 1926, Koga was again posted to France, where he served as a naval attaché in Paris until November 1, 1928.

Recalled to Japan in 1930 and being given command of the Yokosuka Naval Station, Koga captained the heavy cruiser Aoba from December 31, 1930, and the battleship Ise from December 31, 1931, until his appointment to rear admiral on December 31, 1932 and transfer to be Chief of the Imperial Japanese Navy General Staff's Intelligence Division in 1933.

Koga became Vice Chief of the Navy General Staff and was promoted to vice admiral on December 31, 1936 shortly before the beginning of the Second Sino-Japanese War in 1937.

Commander of the IJN 2nd Fleet in 1939, Koga was placed in command of the China Area Fleet on September 1, 1941. Koga shared Yamamoto's misgivings about war with the United States, but disagreed with Yamamoto regarding the use of naval aviation, remaining a firm battleship advocate until events later in the Pacific War proved his position outdated.

=== Pacific War ===
==== Battle of Hong Kong ====
With the start of the Pacific War, Koga commanded naval operations during the Battle of Hong Kong from December 9, 1941 to the end of the month.

==== Commander in Chief of the Combined Fleet ====
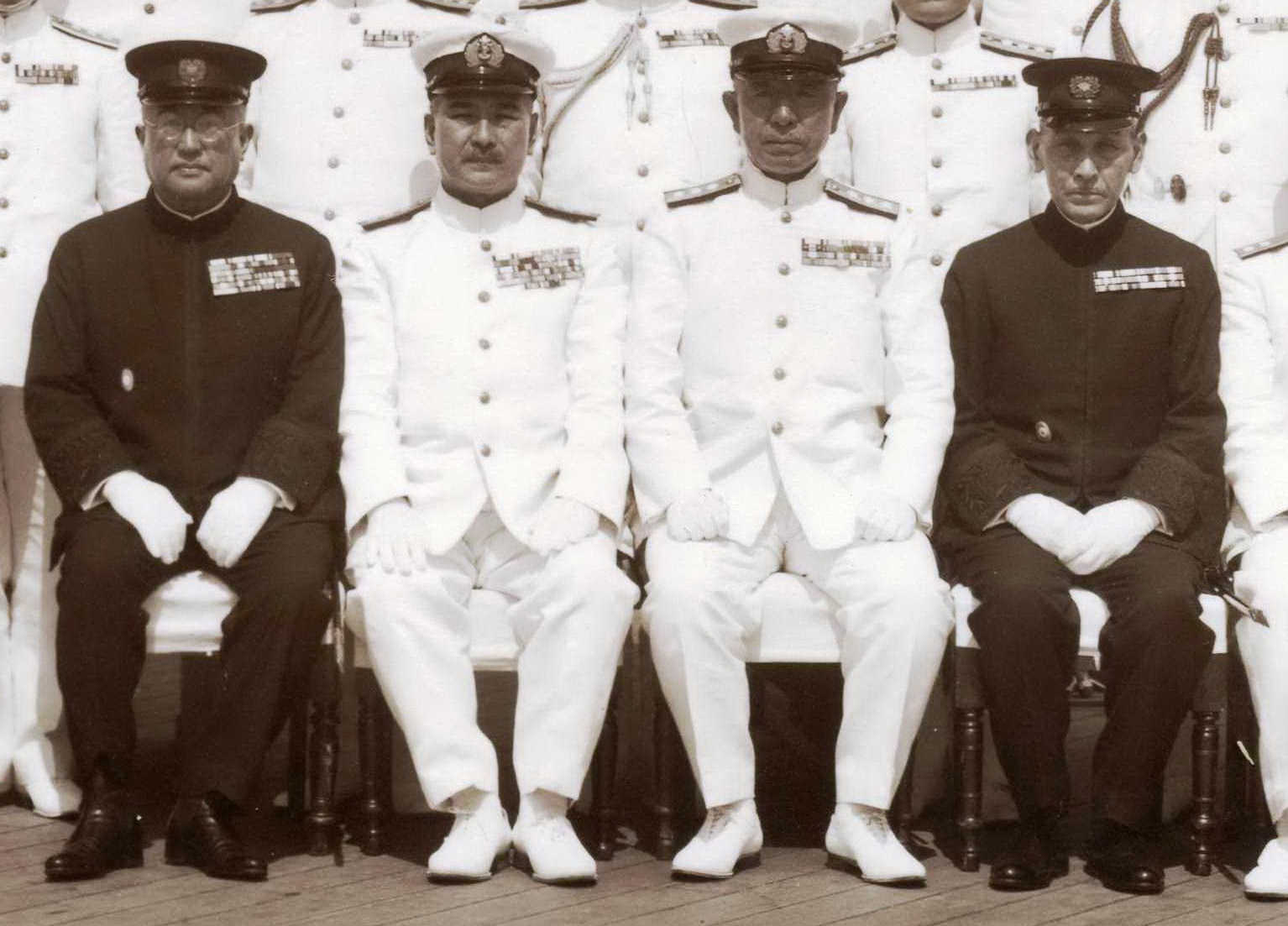
Tsuneo Matsudaira, Shigetarō Shimada, Mineichi Koga, and Saburō Hyakutake on the deck of the battleship Musashi, June 1943

Following the death of Admiral Isoroku Yamamoto on April 18, 1943, Koga succeeded Yamamoto as Commander in Chief of the Combined Fleet. His flagship was the battleship Musashi. Koga attempted to revitalize Japanese naval operations by reorganizing the Combined Fleet into task forces built around aircraft carriers in imitation of the United States Navy, and organized a land-based naval air fleet to work in coordination with the carriers. Operationally, he intended to mount an aggressive counteroffensive, first in the Aleutians to dilute American forces and eventually to lure the American fleet into a major naval engagement in late 1943. However, the losses of Japan's land and carrier based aircraft in the Southwest Pacific eventually forced a Japanese withdrawal from the Solomons to the aero-naval base complex at Rabaul in the Bismarcks by the end of the year, and the simultaneous defeat in the Gilbert Islands of the Central Pacific in November 1943. Koga gradually adopted a more conservative stance, attempting to conserve his remaining forces for a decisive battle to inflict maximum damage on the Americans when they closed toward the 'Inner Defense Lines' of the Marianas and Philippines (code named "Z plan"). An additional strategic change in late 1943 was the establishment of the Grand Escort Command of better organized convoys and increased ASW vessels in the face of increasingly successful U.S. submarine attacks on Empire shipping lanes, although this would not be nearly enough to prevent the collapse of the Japanese merchant marine over the following year.

== Death ==
Koga was killed when his plane, a Kawanishi H8K ("Emily") flying boat, crashed during a typhoon between Palau and Davao while he was overseeing the withdrawal of the Combined Fleet from its Palau headquarters on March 31, 1944. His chief of staff, Vice Admiral Shigeru Fukudome, survived ditching in a second airplane off Cebu and was held captive by Filipino guerrillas, during which time Koga's battle plans found their way into Allied hands. His death was not announced until May 1944 when he was formally replaced by Admiral Soemu Toyoda. From page 20 of I Was A Kamikaze, by Ryuji Nagatsuka, after describing reversals at Rabaul and Truk, he adds: "The death of Admiral Koga, successor to Admiral Yamamoto, had been another shock for the Japanese nation. These distressing circumstances had forced the naval and military Chiefs of Staff to resign. They had been replaced by General Tojo and Admiral Shimada." From then on, Prime Minister Tojo held both the portfolio of the Minister of Armed Forces and the post of Chief of Imperial General Staff in the army.

Koga was promoted to Marshal Admiral posthumously and he was accorded a state funeral. His grave is at the Tama Cemetery, outside of Tokyo.

== Notes ==
Military offices
| Preceded by Katagiri Eikichi | Aoba; Commanding Officer; 1 December 1930 – 1 December 1931 | Succeeded by Hoshino Kurayoshi |
| Preceded by Hani Rokurō | Ise; Commanding Officer; 1 December 1931 – 1 December 1932 | Succeeded by Tabata Hiroyoshi |
| Preceded by Shimada Shigetarō | Naval Intelligence Bureau; Director; 1 December 1932 – 1 September 1933 | Succeeded by Tsuda Shizue |
| Preceded by Shimada Shigetarō | Weapons and Mobilization Bureau; Director; 15 September 1933 – 15 November 1935 | Succeeded by Takahashi Ibō |
| Preceded by Hamada Kichijirō | 7th Squadron; Commander; 15 November 1935 – 1 December 1936 | Succeeded by Sawamoto Yorio |
| Preceded by Yoshida Zengo | Training Fleet; Commander-in-chief; 1 December 1936 – 1 December 1937 | Succeeded by Takasu Shirō |
| Preceded by Shimada Shigetarō | Navy General Staff; Vice-Chairman; 1 December 1937 – 21 October 1939 | Succeeded by Kondō Nobutake |
| Preceded by Toyoda Soemu | 2nd Fleet; Commander-in-chief; 21 October 1939 – 1 September 1941 | Succeeded by Kondō Nobutake |
| Preceded by Shimada Shigetarō | China Area Fleet; Commander-in-chief; 1 September 1941 – 10 November 1942 | Succeeded by Yoshida Zengo |
| Preceded by Hirata Noboru | Yokosuka Naval District; Commander-in-chief; 10 November 1942 – 21 April 1943 | Succeeded by (acting Commander-in-Chief); Mikawa Gunichi; Commander-in-Chief; Toyoda Soemu |
| Preceded by Yamamoto Isoroku | Combined Fleet; Commander-in-chief; 21 April 1943 – 31 March 1944 | Succeeded by Toyoda Soemu |
