= Harukichi Hyakutake =

Japanese WWII general

- 百武 晴吉
- Born: 25 May 1888; Saga, Japan
- Died: 10 March 1947 (aged 58); Tokyo, Japan
- Education: Imperial Japanese Army Academy; Army Staff College
- Relatives: Saburō Hyakutake (brother); Gengo Hyakutake (brother)
- Military career
- Allegiance: Empire of Japan
- Branch: Imperial Japanese Army
- Service years: 1909–1945
- Rank: Lieutenant General
- Units: Imperial Japanese Army General Staff; Kwantung Army
- Commands: 78th Infantry Regiment; 4th Mixed Brigade; 18th Infantry Division; IJA 17th Army
- Conflicts: Second Sino-Japanese War; World War II; New Guinea campaign; Guadalcanal campaign; Solomon Islands campaign; Bougainville campaign
- Awards: Order of the Rising Sun, 1st class

Harukichi Hyakutake (百武 晴吉, Hyakutake Harukichi; 25 May 1888 – 10 March 1947) was a general in the Imperial Japanese Army in World War II. He is sometimes referred to as Haruyoshi Hyakutake or Seikichi Hyakutake. His elder brothers Saburō Hyakutake and Gengo Hyakutake were admirals in the Imperial Japanese Navy.

== Biography ==
=== Early career ===
Born in Saga Prefecture, Hyakutake graduated as an infantry officer from the 21st class of the Imperial Japanese Army Academy in 1909. Noted generals Kanji Ishiwara and Jo Iimura were among his classmates, as was future Chinese leader Chiang Kai-shek. He attended the 33rd class of the Army Staff College in 1921, where he studied cryptanalysis, and was assigned to the Imperial Japanese Army General Staff after graduation.

From 1925 to 1927, as a lieutenant colonel, Hyakutake served as the Japanese Resident Officer in Poland. In 1928 he was assigned to the Headquarters of the Kwantung Army in China. As a colonel he worked at the Army's signal school in 1932 then as a section chief in the General Staff until 1935. After commanding the 78th Infantry Regiment for one year, he took over as Superintendent of the Hiroshima Military Preparatory School in April 1936 and was promoted to major general in March 1937.

In August 1937, Hyakutake became Superintendent of the Signal School. In March 1939 he took command of the 4th Mixed Brigade and was promoted to lieutenant general in August of the same year. From February 1940 until April 1941 he was commander of the IJA 18th Division.

=== World War II ===
In May 1942 Hyakutake was assigned command of the IJA 17th Army, headquartered at Rabaul in the Southwest Pacific. His command was subsequently involved in the New Guinea, Guadalcanal, and Solomon Islands campaigns. After the Japanese Eighth Area Army under General Hitoshi Imamura took over operations in the theater, Hyakutake directed Japanese army units solely in the Solomons, primarily on Bougainville. He and his forces were trapped on Bougainville when the Allies established a heavily fortified perimeter at Cape Torokina, and Hyakutake was cut off from reinforcements and re-supply. His attacks on the perimeter in December 1943 failed, and his army was forced to live off the land, hiding in jungle caves for most of the rest of the war.

Hyakutake suffered a debilitating stroke and was relieved of his duties in February 1945 by General Masatane Kanda. There was no way to evacuate him to Japan for medical treatment until February 1946, after the surrender of Japan. He died on 10 March 1947.

== Notes ==
Government offices
Preceded by Tomitarō Horii	Commander of Occupied New Guinea; 1942	Succeeded by Hatazō Adachi
Preceded by Tomitarō Horii	Commander of Occupied New Guinea; 1942	Succeeded by Hitoshi Imamura
