= Yokosuka Naval District =

Japanese naval base prior to 1945

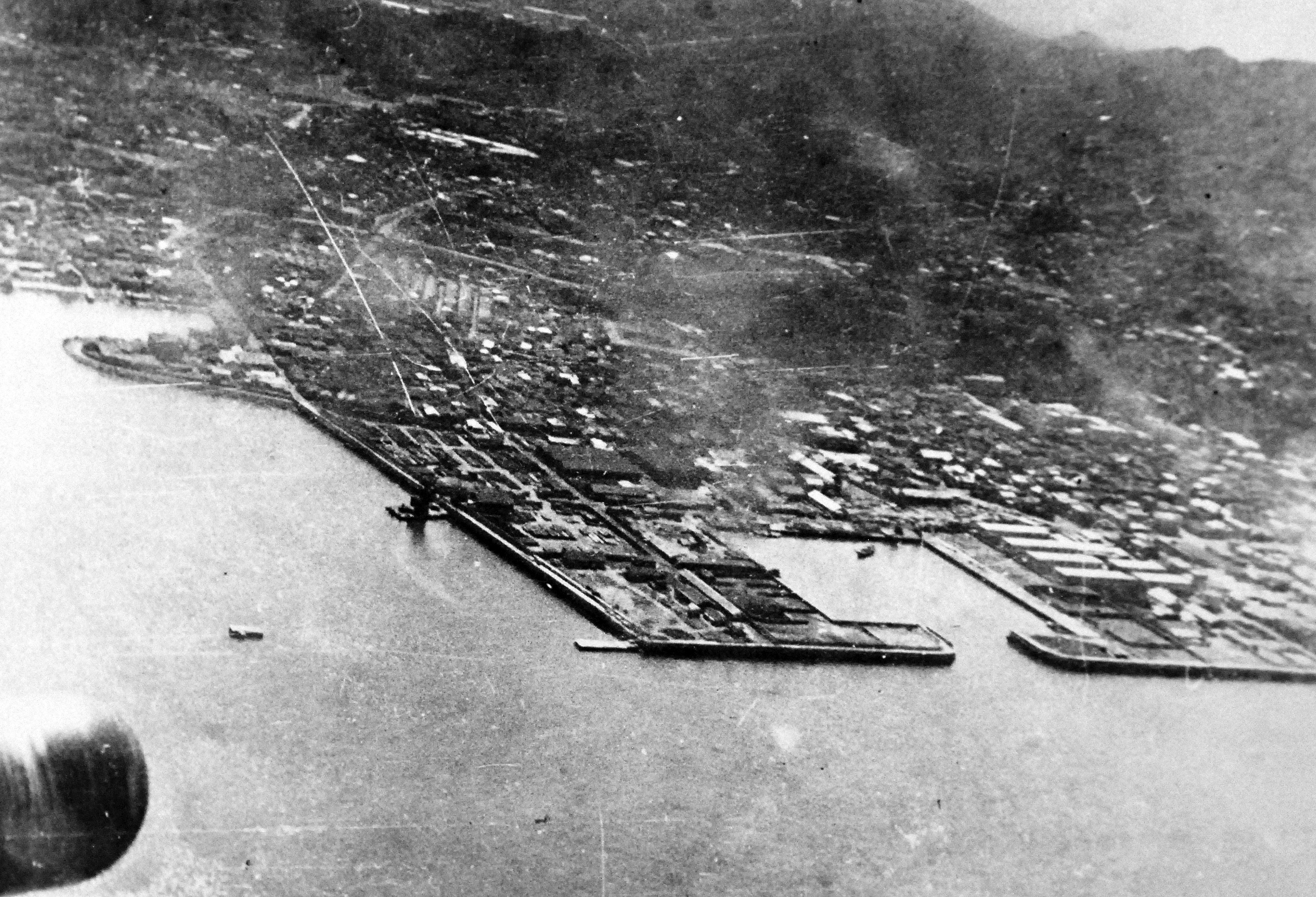
Yokosuka Naval HQ in April 1942

Yokosuka Naval District (横須賀鎮守府, Yokosuka chinjufu) was the first of four main administrative districts of the pre-war Imperial Japanese Navy. Its territory included Tokyo Bay and the Pacific coasts of central and northern Honshū from the Kii Peninsula to Shimokita Peninsula. Its headquarters, along with most of its installations, including the Yokosuka Naval Arsenal, were located in the city of Yokosuka, which constituted the Yokosuka Naval Base.

== History ==
The location of Yokosuka at the entrance to strategic Tokyo Bay was recognized of critical importance by the Tokugawa shogunate and early Meiji government. In 1866, the Tokugawa shogunate government established the Yokosuka Seisakusho, a military arsenal and naval base, with the help of foreign engineers, including the French naval architect Léonce Verny. The new facility was intended to produce modern, western-style warships and equipment for the Tokugawa navy. After the Boshin War and the Meiji Restoration, the new Meiji government took over control of the facility in 1871, renaming it the Yokosuka Zosenjo (Yokosuka Shipyards). In August 1876, the Imperial Japanese Navy was organized into eastern and a western strategic zones, with the eastern zone Tōkai chinjufu (東海鎮守府) based at Yokosuka, and the western zone Saikai chinjufu (西海鎮守府) based at Nagasaki. However, for ease of communications with naval headquarters in Tokyo, the Tōkai Naval District was relocated to Yokohama in September 1876.

With the reorganization of the Imperial Japanese Navy in April 1886, Japan was divided into five naval districts for recruiting and supply, and the headquarters for the Tokai Naval District was relocated back to Yokosuka, becoming the Yokosuka Naval District, and the Yokosuka Naval Arsenal was placed under its command. As with all naval districts, it was under the direction of the Navy Ministry during peacetime, and came under the command of the fleets stationed within the district in time of war. A Bureau of Torpedo Warfare was established at Yokusuka in June 1885. In a further administrative re-organization of the Japanese Navy in 1889, Yokosuka was designated as the “First Naval District” (第一海軍区, dai-ichi kaigunku), and its harbor was dredged, a breakwater extended and docking facilities for warships were increased. A Bureau of Mine Warfare was also established. In 1893, schools for naval mechanical engineering, torpedo warfare and naval artillery were established. Schools for naval engineering, and for mine warfare followed in 1907 and a naval medical center in 1908. Naval aviation facilities were established in June 1912, followed by a wireless communications facility in April 1913.

On January 14, 1917, the armoured cruiser Tsukuba exploded and sank in Yokosuka port in an accident. The Naval Construction Department was established in 1921. In June 1930, a Naval Communications School was established, but the Naval Mine School was made independent of the naval district. A Naval Aviation School was established in April 1934.

=== Pacific war ===
At the time of the attack on Pearl Harbor in 1941, Yokosuka Naval District encompassed the following

- Yokosuka Naval District HQ
  - Yokosuka Naval Base
    - Yokosuka Naval Base HQ
    - Yokosuka Communications Center
    - Yokosuka Supply Department
    - Accounting Department
    - Construction Department
    - Ports & Docks Unit
    - Yokosuka Naval Arsenal
    - Naval Hospital
    - Naval Prison
    - Naval Fuel Depot
    - Yokosuka Base Garrison
    - Yokosuka 1st Naval Barracks
    - Yokosuka 2nd Naval Barracks
    - Yokosuka Special Naval Landing Forces
  - Yokosuka Submarine Base
  - Yokosuka Security Squadron
    - Auxiliary Cruiser Noshiro Maru, Auxiliary gunboat Shoei Maru, Meiji Maru No. 1
    - Yokosuka Local Defence Squadron
    - Minesweeper Division 25; Auxiliary minesweeper Misago Maru No. 1, Misago Maru No. 3, Kongo Maru No. 2, Naruo Maru, Shintohoku Maru, Togo Maru
    - Minesweeper Division 26; Auxiliary minesweeper Banshu Maru No. 18, Keijin Maru No. 1, Keijin Maru No. 2, Showa Maru No. 10,
  - Submarine tender Komahashi
  - Destroyer Sawakaze, Yūgumo
  - Submarine Chaser No. 22, No. 23
  - Yokosuka Naval Air Group (Oppama)
  - Tateyama Naval Air Group
  - Kisarazu Naval Air Group
  - 11th Combined Air Group (Training)
    - Kasumigaura Naval Air Group
    - Tsukuba Naval Air Group
    - Yatabe Naval Air Group
    - Hyakurihara Naval Air Group (Ibaraki Pref)
    - Kashima Naval Air Group
    - Suzuka Naval Air Group
    - Tsuchiura Naval Air Group

In May 1945, Michitaro Tozuka became the final commander of the Yokosuka Naval District. Yokosuka was bombed by United States Navy and United States Army Air Forces aircraft in the final stages of the Pacific War, most notably during the attack on Yokosuka on 18 July 1945, but many of its facilities were captured intact by the Allied forces. The Yokosuka area came under occupation by American forces during the occupation of Japan, and most of the facilities of the former Yokosuka Naval District were inherited by the United States 7th Fleet and are now known as United States Fleet Activities Yokosuka. A small portion of the area continues to be used by the modern post-war Japanese Maritime Self-Defense Force and are now known as JMSDF Yokosuka Naval Base, which has preserved a portion of the original red brick gates.

== List of commanders ==
=== Commander of Tōkai Naval District ===
No.	Name	Portrait	Rank	Term of Office	
No.	Name	Portrait	Rank	Start	End
1	Itō Sukemaro		Vice Admiral	5 September 1876	5 March 1880
2	Abo Kiyoyasu		Rear Admiral	5 March 1880	4 December 1880
3	Nakamuta Kuranosuke		Vice Admiral	4 December 1880	17 June 1881
4	Nire Kagenori		Vice Admiral	17 June 1881	12 October 1882
5	Nakamuta Kuranosuke		Vice Admiral	12 October 1882	14 December 1884

=== Director of Yokusuka Naval District ===
No.	Name	Portrait	Rank	Term of Office	
No.	Name	Portrait	Rank	Start	End
1	Nakamuta Kuranosuke		Vice Admiral	14 December 1884	26 April 1886

=== Commanding officers of Yokusuka Naval District ===
No.	Name	Portrait	Rank	Term of Office	
No.	Name	Portrait	Rank	Start	End
1	Nakamuta Kuranosuke		Vice Admiral	26 April 1886	8 March 1889
2	Nire Kagenori		Vice Admiral	8 March 1889	17 June 1891
3	Akamatsu Noriyoshi		Vice Admiral	17 June 1891	12 December 1892
4	Itō Sukeyuki		Vice Admiral	12 December 1892	20 May 1893
5	Inoue Yoshika		Vice Admiral	20 May 1893	16 February 1895
6	Aiura Norimichi		Vice Admiral	16 February 1895	9 April 1897
7	Tsuboi Kōzō		Vice Admiral	9 April 1897	30 January 1898
8	Samejima Kazunori		Vice Admiral	1 February 1898	19 January 1899
9	Aiura Norimichi		Vice Admiral	19 January 1899	20 May 1900
10	Inoue Yoshika		Vice Admiral Admiral (after 12 December 1901	20 May 1900	20 December 1905
11	Kamimura Hikonojō		Vice Admiral	20 December 1905	1 December 1909
12	Uryū Sotokichi		Vice Admiral Admiral (after 16 October 1912)	1 December 1909	1 December 1912
13	Hikohachi Yamada		Vice Admiral	1 December 1912	29 May 1914
14	Ijichi Suetaka		Vice Admiral	29 May 1914	23 September 1915
15	Fujii Kōichi		Vice Admiral	23 September 1915	1 December 1916
16	Prince Higashifushimi Yorihito		Vice Admiral	1 December 1916	1 December 1917
17	Nawa Matahachirō		Vice Admiral Admiral (after 2 July 1918)	1 December 1917	24 August 1920
18	Yamaya Tanin		Admiral	24 August 1920	27 July 1922
19	Takarabe Takeshi		Admiral	27 July 1922	15 May 1923
20	Nomaguchi Kaneo		Admiral	15 May 1923	5 February 1924
21	Horinouchi Saburō		Vice Admiral	5 February 1924	1 December 1924
22	Kanji Kato		Vice Admiral	1 December 1924	10 December 1926
23	Okada Keisuke		Admiral	10 December 1926	20 April 1927
24	Abo Kiyokazu		Admiral	20 April 1927	16 May 1928
25	Yoshikawa Yasuhira		Vice Admiral	16 May 1928	10 December 1928
26	Yamamoto Eisuke		Vice Admiral	10 December 1928	11 November 1929
27	Ōsumi Mineo		Vice Admiral Admiral (after 1 April 1931)	11 November 1929	1 December 1931
28	Nomura Kichisaburō		Vice Admiral	1 December 1931	2 February 1932
29	Yamamoto Eisuke		Admiral	2 February 1932	10 October 1932
30	Nomura Kichisaburō		Vice Admiral Admiral (after 1 March 1933)	10 October 1932	15 November 1933
31	Nagano Osami		Vice Admiral Admiral (after 30 March 1934)	15 November 1933	15 November 1934
32	Suetsugu Nobumasa		Admiral	15 November 1934	2 December 1935
33	Yonai Mitsumasa		Vice Admiral	2 December 1935	1 December 1936
34	Hyakutake Gengo		Vice Admiral Admiral (after 1 April 1937)	1 December 1936	25 April 1938
35	Hasegawa Kiyoshi		Vice Admiral Admiral (after 1 April 1939)	25 April 1938	1 May 1940
36	Oikawa Koshirō		Admiral	1 May 1940	5 September 1940
37	Shiozawa Kōichi		Admiral	5 September 1940	10 September 1941
38	Shimada Shigetarō		Admiral	10 September 1941	18 October 1941
39	Hirata Noboru		Vice Admiral	18 October 1941	10 November 1942
40	Koga Mineichi		Admiral	10 November 1942	21 April 1943
Acting Commander	Mikawa Gunichi		Vice Admiral	21 April 1943	21 May 1943
41	Toyoda Soemu		Admiral	21 May 1943	3 May 1944
42	Yoshida Zengo		Admiral	3 May 1944	2 August 1944
43	Nomura Naokuni		Admiral	2 August 1944	15 September 1944
44	Tsukahara Nishizō		Vice Admiral	15 September 1944	1 May 1945
45	Tozuka Michitarō		Vice Admiral	1 May 1945	20 November 1945
Acting Commander	Komura Keizō		Rear Admiral	20 November 1945	30 November 1945

== See also ==
- United States Fleet Activities Yokosuka
- Japan Maritime Self-Defense Force#District Forces
