= 2nd Fleet (Imperial Japanese Navy) =

Japanese naval fleet (1903–1945)

- Active: 27 October 1903 – 20 April 1945
- Country: Japan
- Branch: Imperial Japanese Navy
- Engagements: World War II; Invasion of Thailand; Battle of Leyte Gulf
- Battle honours: Pacific War

Commanders
- Notable commanders: Kamimura Hikonojo; Soemu Toyoda; Takeo Kurita; Seiichi Ito

The 2nd Fleet (第二艦隊, Dai-ni Kantai) was a fleet of the Imperial Japanese Navy (IJN) created as a mobile strike force in response to hostilities with Russia, and saw action in every IJN military operation until the end of World War II.

== History ==
Established on 27 October 1903, the 2nd Fleet was created by the Imperial General Headquarters as a mobile strike force of cruisers and destroyers to pursue the Imperial Russian Navy's Vladivostok-based cruiser squadron while the remaining bulk of the Japanese fleet (the IJN 1st Fleet) continued to blockade Port Arthur in hopes of luring the battleships of the Russian Pacific Fleet into an open sea classic line of battle confrontation.

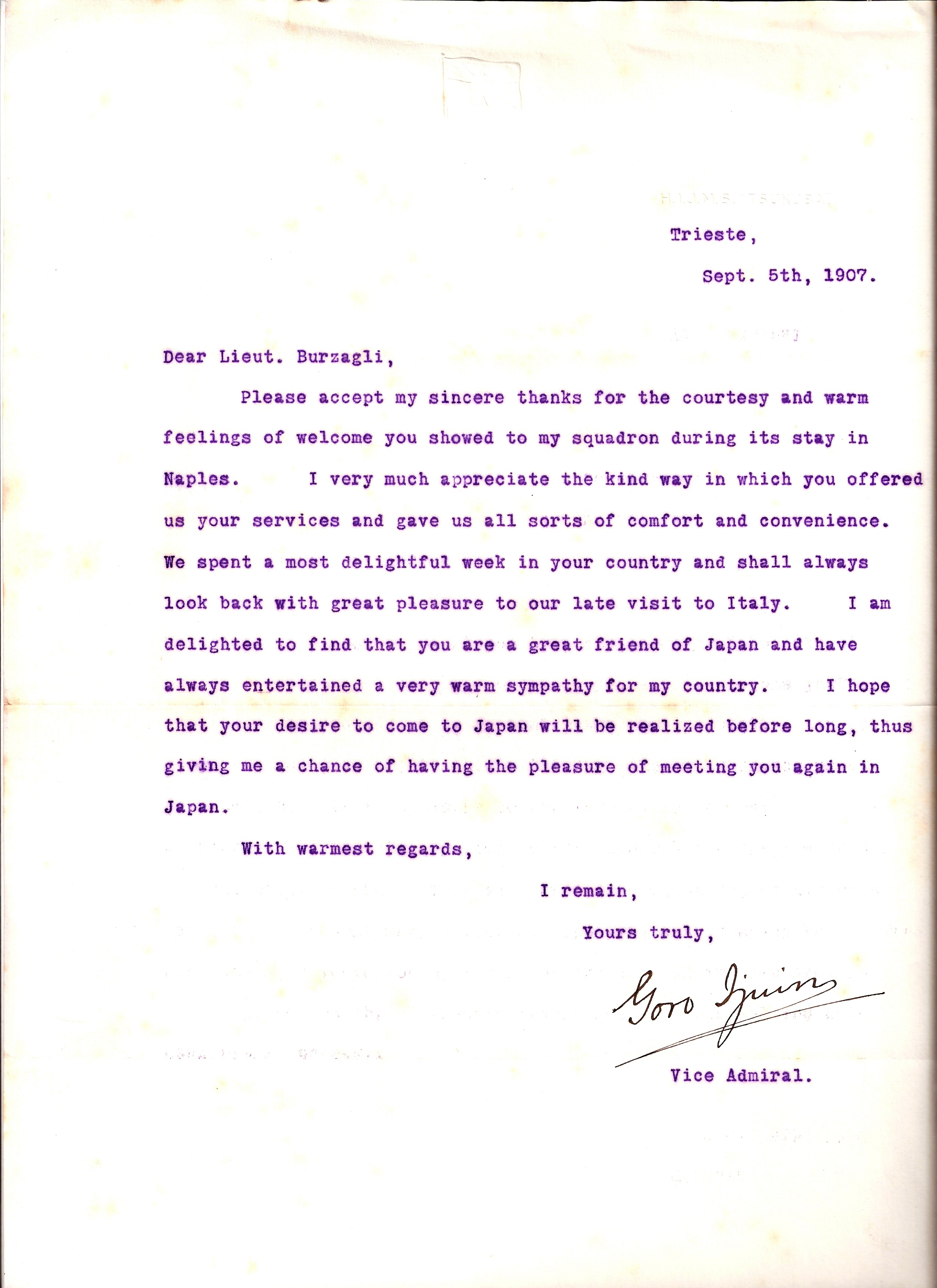
Letter from Vice admiral Ijuin Gorō to Italian Royal Navy Lieutenant Ernesto Burzagli thanking him for courtesies extended to the Imperial Japanese Navy Second Fleet which visited Italy in 1907.

As the main mobile force in the IJN, the 2nd Fleet saw the bulk of all future IJN combat operations from the time of its inception until IJN dissolution at the end of World War II.

== Order of Battle at time of Pearl Harbor ==
Based at Samah, Hainan Island

4th Division

CA Takao (fleet flagship)
CA Atago
CA Chōkai
CA Maya

5th Division

CA Haguro (flagship)
CA Myōkō
CA Nachi

7th Division

CA Kumano (flagship)
CA Mikuma
CA Mogami
CA Suzuya

8th Division

CA Tone (flagship)
CA Chikuma

Other

AD Kamikaze Maru

2nd Destroyer Squadron

CL Jintsū (flagship)

8th Destroyer Division

DD Arashio
DD Asashio
DD Michishio
DD Ōshio

15th Destroyer Division

DD Hayashio
DD Kuroshio
DD Natsushio
DD Oyashio

16th Destroyer Division

DD Amatsukaze
DD Hatsukaze
DD Tokitsukaze
DD Yukikaze

18th Destroyer Division

DD Arare
DD Kagerō
DD Kasumi
DD Shiranuhi

4th Destroyer Squadron

CL Naka (flagship)

2nd Destroyer Division

DD Harusame
DD Murasame
DD Samidare
DD Yudachi

4th Destroyer Division

DD Arashi
DD Hagikaze
DD Maikaze
DD Nowaki

9th Destroyer Division

DD Asagumo
DD Minegumo
DD Natsugumo
DD Yamagumo

24th Destroyer Division

DD Kawakaze
DD Suzukaze
DD Umikaze
DD Yamakaze

== Order in the Malayan Campaign ==
=== Distant Cover Force ===
Distant Cover Force
| Commander | | Vessel |
|---|---|---|
| Nobutake Kondō (Commander of IJN 2nd Fleet) | | Kongō |
Flagship
Kongō (flagship of 3rd Battleship Division & flagship of IJN 2nd Fleet)
| Units | Constituents | |
| 3rd Battleship Division | 2 Kongō-class battleships | Haruna |
| 3rd Battleship Division | 2 Kongō-class battleships | Kongō |
| 4th Cruiser Division | 2 Takao-class heavy cruisers | Takao |
| 4th Cruiser Division | 2 Takao-class heavy cruisers | Atago |
| 4th Destroyer Division | 10 Destroyers | |
| 6th Destroyer Division | 10 Destroyers | |
| 8th Destroyer Division | 10 Destroyers | |

=== Closed Cover Force ===
Closed Cover Force
| Commander | | Vessel |
|---|---|---|
| Jisaburō Ozawa | | Chōkai |
Flagship
Chōkai (flagship of 4th Cruiser Division) (+ 1 Destroyer)
| Units | Constituents | |
| 7th Cruiser Division | 4 Mogami-class heavy cruisers | Mogami |
| 7th Cruiser Division | 4 Mogami-class heavy cruisers | Mikuma |
| 7th Cruiser Division | 4 Mogami-class heavy cruisers | Suzuya |
| 7th Cruiser Division | 4 Mogami-class heavy cruisers | Kumano |
| 3rd Destroyer Squadron | 1 Nagara-class light cruiser | Yura |
| 3rd Destroyer Squadron | 8 Destroyers | |

=== Invasion Force ===
Invasion Force
| Commander | | Vessel |
|---|---|---|
| Shintarō Hashimoto | | Sendai |
Flagship
N/A
| Units | Constituents | |
| 3rd Destroyer Squadron | 1 Sendai-class light cruiser | Sendai |
| 3rd Destroyer Squadron | 10 Destroyers | |
| 12th Seaplane Tender Squadron | 1 Kamikawa Maru-class seaplane tender | Kamikawa Maru (12 Seaplanes) |
| 12th Seaplane Tender Squadron | 1 Sakito Maru-class seaplane tender | Sagara Maru (8 Seaplanes) |
| 12th Seaplane Tender Squadron | 3 Minesweepers | |
| 12th Seaplane Tender Squadron | 10 Army Transport Ships | |
| 3rd Destroyer Squadron | 1 Katori-class light cruiser | Kashii |
| 3rd Destroyer Squadron | 7 Army Transport Ships | |

== Commanders of the IJN 2nd Fleet ==
Commanders, IJN 2nd Fleet
| | Rank | Name | Date |
|---|---|---|---|
| 1 | Vice-Admiral | Hikonojo Kamimura | 27 October 1903 – 20 December 1905 |
| 2 | Vice-Admiral | Baron Dewa Shigeto | 20 December 1905 – 22 November 1906 |
| 3 | Vice-Admiral | Baron Ijuin Gorō | 22 November 1906 – 26 May 1908 |
| 4 | Vice-Admiral | Baron Dewa Shigeto | 26 May 1908 – 1 December 1909 |
| 5 | Vice-Admiral | Shimamura Hayao | 1 December 1909 – 1 December 1911 |
| 6 | Vice Admiral | Yoshimatsu Motaro | 1 December 1911 – 1 December 1912 |
| 7 | Vice Admiral | Ijichi Suetaka | 1 December 1912 – 1 December 1913 |
| 8 | Vice Admiral | Kato Sadakichi | 1 December 1913 – 5 February 1915 |
| 9 | Vice Admiral | Nawa Matahachiro | 5 February 1915 – 13 December 1915 |
| 10 | Vice Admiral | Baron Yashiro Rokuro | 13 December 1915 – 1 December 1917 |
| 11 | Vice Admiral | Prince Higashifushimi Yorihito | 1 December 1917 – 13 June 1918 |
| 12 | Vice Admiral* | Yamaya Tanin | 13 June 1918 – 1 December 1919 |
| 13 | Vice Admiral | Prince Fushimi Hiroyasu | 1 December 1919 – 1 December 1920 |
| 14 | Vice Admiral | Baron Kantarō Suzuki | 1 December 1920 – 1 December 1921 |
Disbanded (1 December 1921 – 1 December 1922)
| 15 | Vice Admiral | Naoe Nakano | 1 December 1922 – 1 June 1923 |
| 16 | Vice Admiral | Hiroharu Kato | 1 June 1923 – 1 December 1924 |
| 17 | Vice Admiral | Hanroku Saito | 1 December 1924 – 16 September 1925 |
| 18 | Vice Admiral | Saburo Hyakutake | 16 September 1925 – 10 December 1926 |
| 19 | Vice Admiral | Yasuhira Yoshikawa | 10 December 1926 – 16 May 1928 |
| 20 | Vice Admiral | Koshiro Otani | 16 May 1928 – 10 December 1928 |
| 21 | Vice Admiral | Mineo Ōsumi | 10 December 1928 – 11 November 1929 |
| 22 | Vice Admiral | Nobutaro Iida | 11 November 1929 – 1 December 1930 |
| 23 | Vice Admiral | Ryozo Nakamura | 1 December 1930 – 1 December 1931 |
| 24 | Vice Admiral | Nobumasa Suetsugu | 1 December 1931 – 15 November 1933 |
| 25 | Vice Admiral | Sankichi Takahashi | 15 November 1933 – 15 November 1934 |
| 26 | Vice Admiral | Mitsumasa Yonai | 15 November 1934 – 2 December 1935 |
| 26 | Vice Admiral | Takayoshi Kato | 2 December 1935 – 1 December 1936 |
| 27 | Vice Admiral | Zengo Yoshida | 1 December 1936 – 1 December 1937 |
| 28 | Vice Admiral | Shigetarō Shimada | 1 December 1937 – 15 November 1938 |
| 29 | Vice Admiral | Soemu Toyoda | 15 November 1938 – 21 October 1939 |
| 30 | Vice Admiral | Mineichi Koga | 21 October 1939 – 1 September 1941 |
| 31 | Vice-Admiral | Nobutake Kondō | 1 September 1941 – 9 August 1943 |
| 32 | Vice Admiral | Takeo Kurita | 9 August 1943 – 23 December 1944 |
| 33 | Vice Admiral | Seiichi Ito | 23 December 1944 – 7 April 1945 |
Vacant (7 April 1945 – 20 April 1945)
Position Abolished
Vice-Admiral*:- promoted to Admiral during tenure

Chief of Staff to IJN 2nd Fleet
| | Rank | Name | Date |
|---|---|---|---|
| 1 | Captain* | Tomazaburo Kato | 28 December 1903 – 12 January 1905 |
| 2 | Captain* | Kōichi Fujii | 12 January 1905 – 20 December 1905 |
| 3 | Captain | Tanin Yamaya | 20 December 1905 – 14 January 1907 |
Vacant (14 January 1907 – 28 September 1907)
| 4 | Captain | Isamu Takeshita | 28 September 1907 – 17 December 1907 |
| 5 | Captain | Ryokitsu Arima | 17 December 1907 – 20 November 1908 |
| 6 | Captain | Tatsuo Matsumura | 20 November 1908 – 1 February 1909 |
Vacant (1 February 1908 – 1 December 1909)
| 7 | Captain | Shichitaro Takagi | 1 December 1909 – 22 January 1911 |
| 8 | Captain | Kiyokaze Yoshida | 22 January 1911 – 1 December 1911 |
| 9 | Commander** | Baron Kiyokazu Abo | 5 December 1911 – 1 December 1912 |
| 10 | Captain | Kiyokaze Yoshida | 1 December 1912 – 1 February 1915 |
| 11 | Captain | Hiroharu Kato | 1 February 1915 – 13 December 1915 |
| 12 | Rear-Admiral | Yasujiro Nagata | 13 December 1915 – 1 December 1916 |
| 13 | Rear-Admiral | Nobutaro Shimamura | 1 December 1916 – 15 September 1917 |
| 14 | Rear-Admiral | Saburo Hyakutake | 15 September 1917 – 10 November 1918 |
| 15 | Rear Admiral | Shigeushi Nakagawa | 10 November 1918 – 1 December 1919 |
| 16 | Rear-Admiral | Yasuhira Yoshikawa | 1 December 1919 – 1 December 1920 |
| 17 | Rear-Admiral | Kikuo Matsumura | 1 December 1920 – 1 December 1921 |
| 18 | Rear-Admiral | Ryozo Nakamura | 1 December 1922 – 6 November 1923 |
| 19 | Rear-Admiral | Masataka Ando | 6 November 1923 – 1 December 1924 |
| 20 | Rear-Admiral | Yukichi Shima | 1 December 1924 – 1 December 1925 |
| 21 | Rear-Admiral | Mitsumasa Yonai | 1 December 1925 – 1 December 1926 |
| 22 | Rear-Admiral | Shigeru Matsuyama | 1 December 1926 – 1 December 1927 |
| 23 | Rear-Admiral | Ken Terajima | 1 December 1927 – 10 December 1928 |
| 24 | Rear-Admiral | Teikichi Hori | 10 December 1928 – 6 September 1929 |
| 25 | Rear-Admiral | Koichi Shiozawa | 6 September 1929 – 1 December 1929 |
| 26 | Rear-Admiral | Shigetarō Shimada | 1 December 1929 – 1 December 1930 |
| 26 | Rear Admiral | Wasuke Komaki | 1 December 1930 – 10 October 1931 |
| 27 | Rear-Admiral | Kamezaburo Nakamura | 10 October 1931 – 15 November 1933 |
| 28 | Rear-Admiral | Jugoro Arichi | 15 November 1933 – 15 November 1934 |
| 29 | Rear Admiral | Taichi Miki | 15 November 1934 – 15 November 1935 |
| 30 | Rear-Admiral | Shunzo Mito | 15 November 1935 – 1 April 1936 |
| 31 | Rear-Admiral | Masaichi Niimi | 1 April 1936 – 1 December 1936 |
| 32 | Rear-Admiral | Gunichi Mikawa | 1 December 1936 – 15 November 1937 |
| 33 | Rear-Admiral | Seiichi Ito | 15 November 1937 – 15 November 1938 |
| 34 | Rear-Admiral | Takeo Takagi | 15 November 1938 – 1 November 1939 |
| 35 | Rear-Admiral | Yoshio Suzuki | 1 November 1939 – 30 August 1941 |
| 36 | Rear-Admiral | Kazutaka Shiraishi | 30 August 1941 – 2 July 1943 |
| 37 | Rear-Admiral | Tomiji Koyanagi | 2 July 1943 – 25 November 1944 |
| 38 | Rear Admiral | Nobuei Morishita | 25 November 1944 – 20 April 1945 |
Position Abolished
Captain*:- promoted to Rear-Admiral during the tenure
Commander**:- promoted to Captain during the tenure
