= Amoy Operation =

1938 operation of the Second Sino-Japanese War

Coordinates: 24.5000°N 118.138°E

- Part of the Second Sino-Japanese War and the interwar period
Date	May 10–12, 1938 (2 days)
Location	Amoy Island in Fujian province, Republic of China
Result	Japanese victory

Belligerents
Japan	China

Commanders and leaders
(Empire of Japan) Koichi Shiozawa	(Republic of China (1912–1949)) Chen Yi

Strength
IJN 5th Fleet	NRA 75th division Amoy fortress command

Casualties and losses
20 killed, 84 wounded.	75th Division : According to divisional commander Song Tiancai's report on May 16 : 1,300+ casualties; According to history of the Anti-Japanese War : 29 officers and 597 soldiers killed 23 officers and 177 soldiers wounded 2 officers and 134 soldiers missing; Xiamen Fortress : 60 to 70 casualties. Japanese claim : over 500 killed.

The Amoy Operation, also known as the Battle of Xiamen (Chinese: 廈門戰鬥) was part of a campaign by Japan during the Second Sino-Japanese War to blockade China to prevent it from communicating with the outside world and importing needed arms and materials. Control of Amoy Island would provide a base to make the blockade of Fujian province more effective.

Like the Canton Operation, the Amoy Operation was overseen by Koichi Shiozawa (1881-1943), who was the commander-in-chief of the Fifth Fleet during the Second Sino-Japanese War (1937-1945). The fleets warships bombarded the city to cover the landing of more than 2,000 invading troops. The poorly equipped defenders of the city were forced to withdraw and move to Sung-yu. The blockade was successful so that China's ability to counterattack was effectively crippled.

== Sources ==
- Hsu Long-hsuen and Chang Ming-kai, History of The Sino-Japanese War (1937-1945) 2nd Ed., 1971. Translated by Wen Ha-hsiung, Chung Wu Publishing; 33, 140th Lane, Tung-hwa Street, Taipei, Taiwan Republic of China. Pg. 247, Map 11.
