= Gosei (meditation) =

Japanese Naval subjects for daily meditation

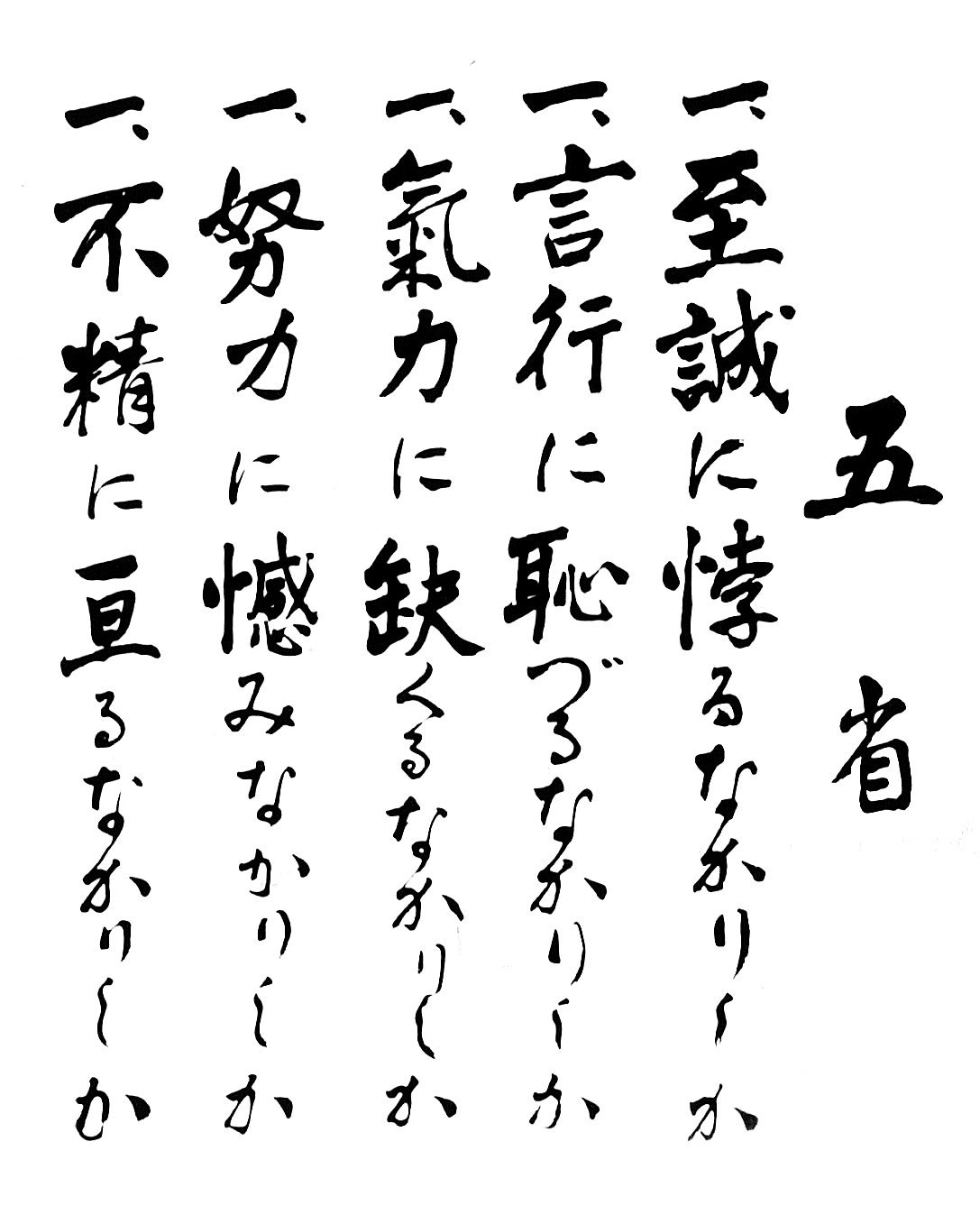
Five Reflections.

Gosei (五省, go-sei; lit., five reflections) are subjects for daily meditation at Japan's Naval Academy.

== Five Reflections ==
These reflections were originally devised by Vice Admiral Hajime Matsushita, who was the Chief of the Imperial Japanese Naval Academy, and used from 1932. Every evening cadets are expected to meditate on these inter-related questions.

1. Hast thou not gone against sincerity (至誠に悖る勿かりしか)
2. Hast thou not felt ashamed of thy words and deeds (言行に恥づる勿かりしか)
3. Hast thou not lacked vigor (氣力に缺くる勿かりしか)
4. Hast thou exerted all possible efforts (努力に憾み勿かりしか)
5. Hast thou not become slothful (不精に亘る勿かりしか)

The crux of this contemplative practice has been translated into English and has been discussed at the United States Naval Academy.

== See also ==
- Five Precepts
