= Saburō Hyakutake =

- 百武 三郎
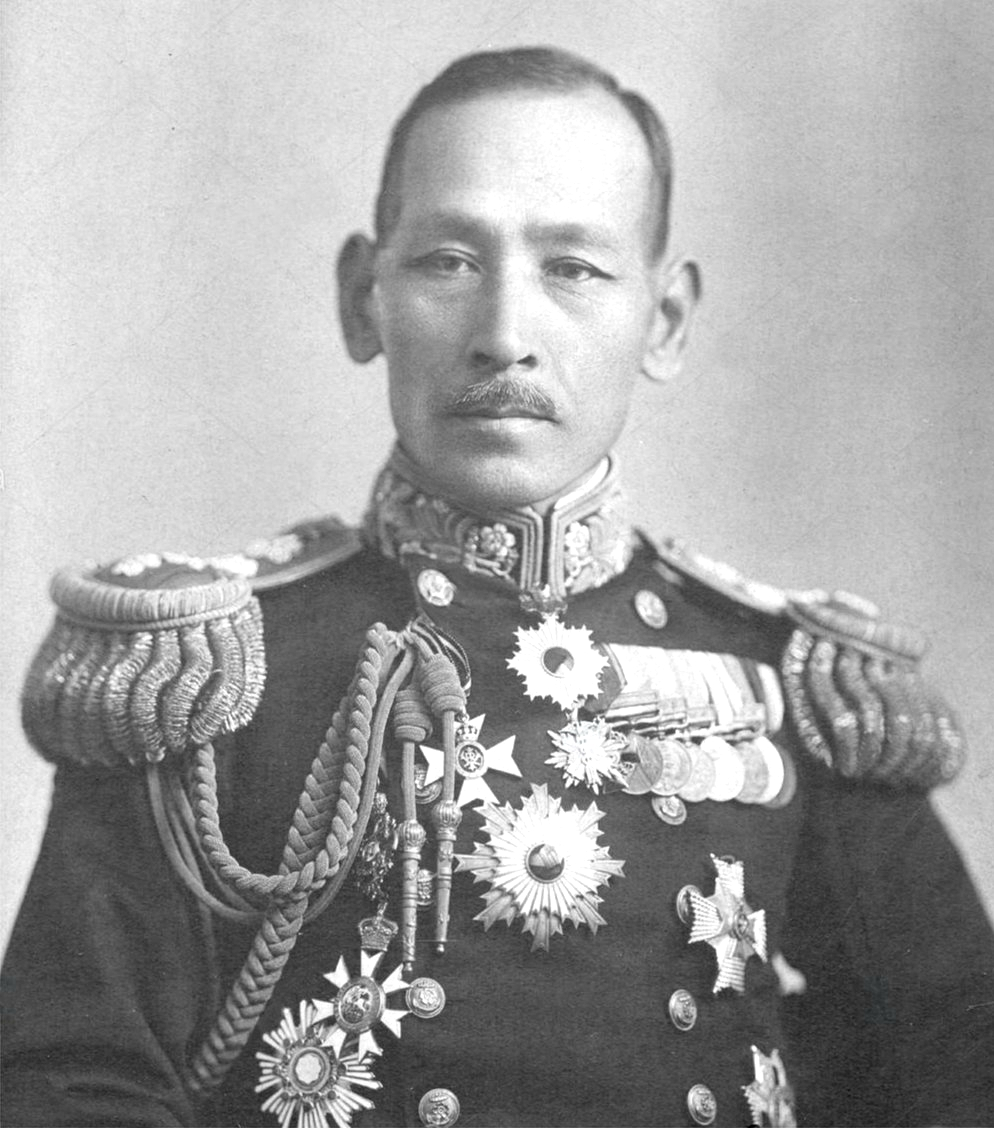
- Born: 3 June 1872; Saga Prefecture, Japan
- Died: 30 October 1963 (aged 91); Japan
- Alma mater: Imperial Japanese Naval Academy; Naval War College
- Relatives: Gengo Hyakutake (brother); Harukichi Hyakutake (brother)
- Military career
- Allegiance: Empire of Japan
- Branch: Imperial Japanese Navy
- Service years: 1894–1928
- Rank: Admiral
- Conflicts: First Sino-Japanese War; Russo-Japanese War
- Awards: Order of the Rising Sun; Order of the Sacred Treasure

Grand Chamberlain to the Emperor
- In office 20 November 1936 – 29 August 1944
- Monarch: Hirohito
- Preceded by: Kantarō Suzuki
- Succeeded by: Hisanori Fujita

Member of the Privy Council
- In office 1 September 1944 – 17 April 1946
- Monarch: Hirohito

Saburō Hyakutake (百武三郎; 3 June 1872 – 30 October 1963) was an Imperial Japanese Navy admiral.

== Biography ==
Hyakutake was born in Saga Prefecture. His younger brothers Gengo and Harukichi also became high ranking military officers.

Hyakutake was a graduate of the Imperial Japanese Naval Academy and the Naval War College. He was a veteran of the First Sino-Japanese War (1894–1895) and the Russo-Japanese War (1904–1905). He was Grand Chamberlain of Japan (1936–1944). He was a recipient of the Order of the Rising Sun and the Order of the Sacred Treasure.

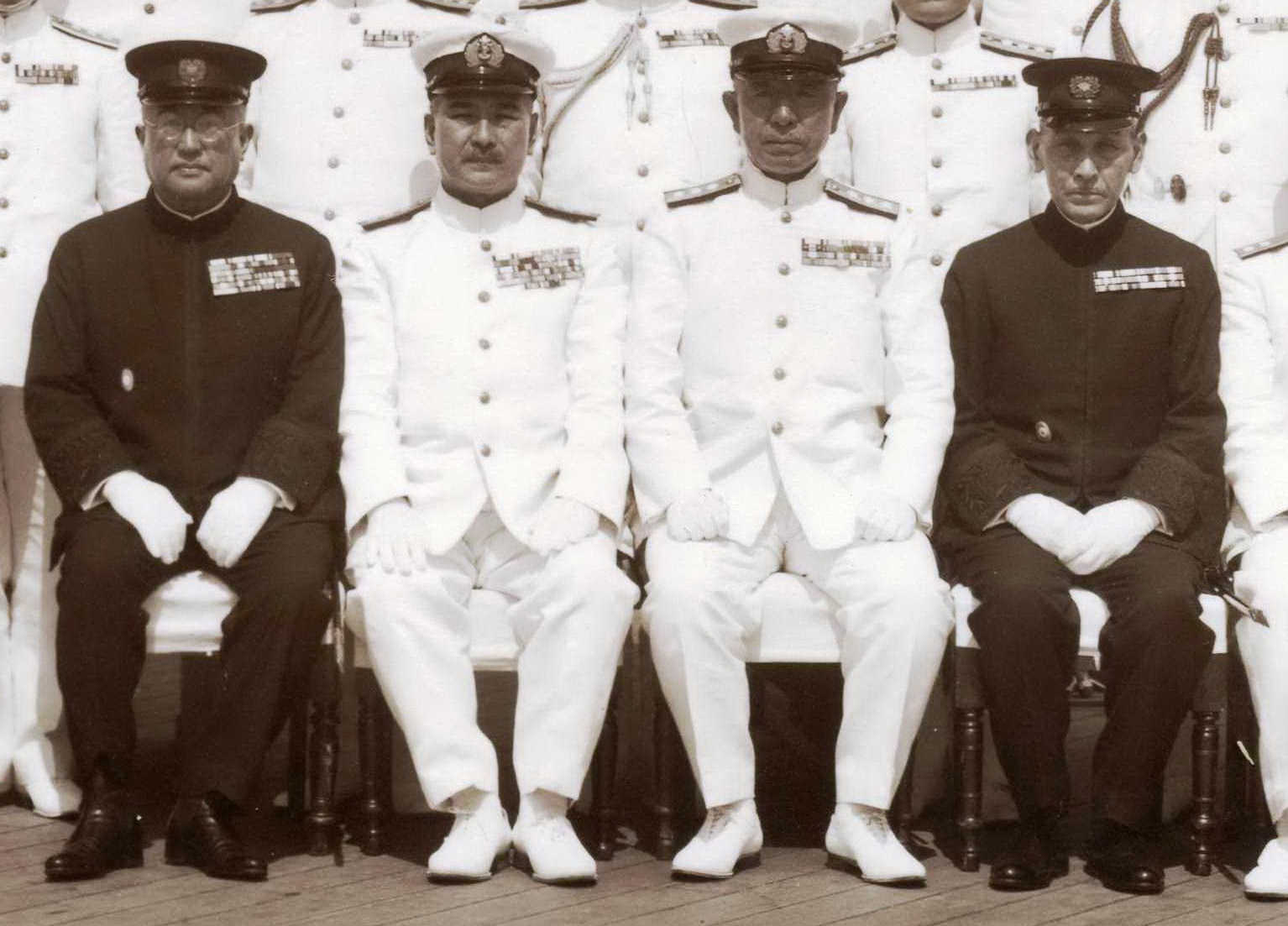
Tsuneo Matsudaira, Shigetarō Shimada, Mineichi Koga, and Saburō Hyakutake, aboard Battleship Musashi, 24 June 1943

== Bibliography ==
- Asian Historical Document Center "常備艦隊及附属艦船乗員表" (List of Crewmen of the Standing Fleet and Attached Vessels),（ref:C06061767700）.
- Fukukawa Hideki『日本海軍将官辞典』(Dictionary of Japanese Naval Officers), Fuyōshobō, 2000.
- Hando Kazutoshi and others "歴代海軍大将全覧" (Complete List of All Admirals of the Japanese Navy), Chūō Kōron Shinsha、2005.
- Hata Ikuhiko, ed. "日本陸海軍総合事典 第2版" (Comprehensive Encyclopedia of the Imperial Japanese Navy and Army, Second Edition), Tōkyō Daigaku Shuppankai, 2005.
- Toyama Misao, ed. "陸海軍将官人事総覧 海軍篇" (Personnel Sourcebook on Japanese Military Officers, Navy Edition), Fuyōshobō, 1981.

Military offices
Preceded by Shimamura Nobutarō	2nd Fleet; Chief-of-staff; 10 November 1918 – 1 December 1919	Succeeded by Nakagawa Shigeushi
Preceded by Saitō Hanroku	Maizuru Guard District; Commander-in-chief; 1 June 1923 - 4 October 1924	Succeeded by Nakazato Shigeji
Preceded by Prince Fushimi Hiroyasu	Sasebo Naval District; Commander-in-chief; 15 April 1925 - 10 December 1926	Succeeded by Furukawa Shinzaburō
Political offices
Preceded by Kantarō Suzuki	Grand Chamberlain of Japan; 1936–1944	Succeeded by Hisanori Fujita
