= Kōichi Shiozawa =

Japanese admiral (1881–1943)

- 塩沢 幸一
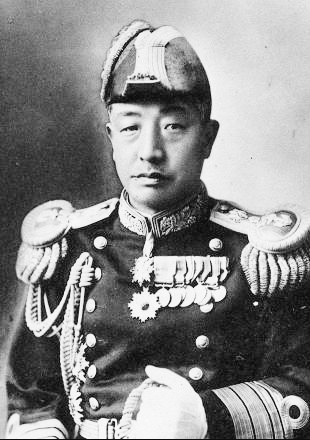
- Vice Admiral Shiozawa Kōichi (1933–39)
- Born: March 5, 1883; Ōkusa-mura, Nagano, Japan
- Died: November 17, 1943 (aged 60); Tsukiji, Tokyo, Japan
- Military career
- Allegiance: Empire of Japan
- Branch: Imperial Japanese Navy
- Service years: 1904–1943
- Rank: Admiral
- Commands: Furutaka, 1st Expeditionary Fleet, Chinkai Guard District, Naval Aviation Bureau, Maizuru Naval District, Sasebo Naval District, 5th Fleet, Naval Construction Bureau, Naval Councillor, Yokosuka Naval District
- Conflicts: Russo-Japanese War; World War I; First Shanghai Incident; Second Sino-Japanese War
- Awards: Grand Cordon of the Order of the Sacred Treasure; Order of the Rising Sun, 2nd class Order of the Golden Kite, 3rd Class

Kōichi Shiozawa (塩沢 幸一, Shiozawa Kōichi; March 5, 1883 – November 17, 1943) was an admiral in the Imperial Japanese Navy during the Second Sino-Japanese War. The literary critic Rinsen Nakazawa was his older brother.

== Biography ==
Shiozawa was born in Ōkusa-mura, Nagano prefecture. His family was distillers of the famed traditional medicinal tonic "Yomeishu". Joining the navy on 16 December 1901, he passed out from the 32nd class of the Imperial Japanese Naval Academy on 14 November 1904, ranking 2nd out of 192 cadets. Famed admiral Isoroku Yamamoto was in the same class.

He served as midshipman on Karasaki and the battleship Asahi during the Russo-Japanese War. Promoted to ensign on August 31, 1905, he was assigned to the destroyer Hibiki and as a sub-lieutenant (from September 29, 1907), to the battleship Mikasa. Following his promotion to lieutenant on October 11, 1909, he was assigned to the battleship Sagami followed by the cruiser Tone.

After graduating from the 13th class of the Navy Staff College in 1914, he was promoted to lieutenant commander on December 1, and was assigned as a naval observer to the United Kingdom from 1917-1919. He served as part of the Royal Navy crew on HMS Resolution and HMS Royal Oak in combat operations in World War I against the German Navy in 1917, as part of Japan's contribution under the Anglo-Japanese Alliance. Promoted to commandeer on December 1, 1919, after his return to Japan, he served in a number of staff positions. He was promoted to captain on December 1, 1923. He became captain of the heavy cruiser Furutaka in 1926. In late 1926 to early 1927, he again served as naval attaché to the United Kingdom. On his return in 1928, he was promoted to rear admiral on December 10.

Shiozawa was Chief of Staff of the IJN 1st Fleet from October 30, 1929 to December 1, 1930, and commander of the 1st China Expeditionary Fleet to June 1932.

At the time of the First Shanghai Incident of January 1932, Shiozawa was in command of a cruiser, four destroyers and two aircraft carriers anchored in the Yangtze River off the international city of Shanghai. They had come to protect Japanese citizens from attacks by Chinese mobs. In response, Nationalist forces moved into the Chinese suburb of Zhabei and skirmished with patrolling Japanese marines. With his men giving way to the more numerous Chinese forces, Shiozawa ordered planes from his carriers to drop bombs over densely populated Zhabei. The attack killed or injured thousands of civilians, and earned Japan the condemnation of the League of Nations.

From December 1932, Shiozawa was commander of the Chinkai Guard District. Shiozawa was promoted to vice admiral on November 15, 1933. He was Director of Naval Air Command from 1934–1935, Commander-in-chief of the Maizuru Naval District from 1935–1936 and of the Sasebo Naval District from 1936-1937. When the IJN 5th Fleet was formed on February 1, 1938 Shiozawa became its first Commander. During his command he oversaw the Amoy Operation and the Canton Operation from October to December 1938. He was decorated with the Order of the Sacred Treasure (1st class) on August 13, 1938. From January 1939, he was Director of the Naval Shipbuilding Command.

Shiozawa was promoted to full admiral on November 15, 1939. He commanded the Yokosuka Naval District from September 5, 1940 to September 10, 1941.

In May 1943, following Admiral Isoroku Yamamoto's death in action, Shiozawa, a lifelong friend, presided over his state funeral. Shiozawa died a few months later, in November 1943 of an acute pancreas ailment.

Military offices
Preceded by None	Furutaka; Commanding Officer; 31 March 1926 – 1 December 1926	Succeeded by Kikui Nobuyoshi
Preceded by Hori Teikichi	2nd Fleet; Chief-of-staff; 6 September 1929 – 1 December 1929	Succeeded by Shimada Shigetarō
Preceded by Terajima Ken	Combined Fleet & 1st Fleet; Chief-of-staff; 30 October 1929 - 1 December 1930	Succeeded by Shimada Shigetarō
Preceded by Yonai Mitsumasa	Chinkai Guard District; Commander; 1 December 1932 – 17 January 1934	Succeeded by Ichimura Hisao
Preceded by Katō Takayoshi	Naval Aviation Bureau; Director; 17 January 1934 – 2 December 1935	Succeeded by Yamamoto Isoroku
Preceded by Matsushita Hajime	Maizuru Guard District; Commander; 2 December 1935 – 1 December 1936	Succeeded by Nakamura Kamezaburō
Preceded by Matsushita Hajime	Sasebo Naval District; Commander; 1 December 1936 – 1 December 1937	Succeeded by Toyoda Teijirō
Fleet Created	5th Fleet; Commander-in-chief; 1 February 1938 – 15 December 1938	Succeeded by Kondō Nobutake
Preceded by Ueda Muneshige	Naval Construction Bureau; Director; 27 January 1939 – 30 August 1939	Succeeded by Toyoda Teijirō
Preceded by Oikawa Koshirō	Yokosuka Naval District; Commander; 5 September 1940 – 10 September 1941	Succeeded by Shimada Shigetarō
