= Japanese submarine tender Karasaki =

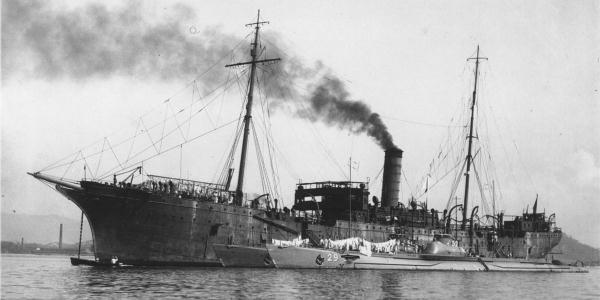
- Karasaki in the Seto Inland Sea circa 1930

History

Empire of Japan
- Name: Karasaki
- Builder: Hawthorn Leslie and Company, UK
- Launched: 30 January 1896
- Completed: 1897
- Acquired: 1904
- Commissioned: 4 July 1905
- Stricken: 1 April 1939
- Fate: Scrapped, 1942

General characteristics
- Type: Submarine tender
- Displacement: 9,570 long tons (9,724 t)
- Length: 127.7 m (419 ft 0 in) o/a
- Beam: 15.2 m (49 ft 10 in)
- Draught: 4.85 m (15 ft 11 in)
- Propulsion: 2 shaft Reciprocating Vertical Triple Expansion (VTE) Engines, 4 boilers; 2,300 shp (1,700 kW)
- Speed: 12.6 knots (14.5 mph; 23.3 km/h)
- Complement: 249
- Armament: 1 × QF 12-pounder 18 cwt naval guns; 4 × QF 3-pounder Hotchkiss

Karasaki (韓崎), was the first submarine tender operated by the Imperial Japanese Navy. She was named after a cape on northern Tsushima Island.

== Background ==
The Imperial Japanese Navy received its first submarines during the Russo-Japanese War, but these vessels were not operational until after the war ended. During the post-war period, submarine warfare was given a low priority for development, as the early submarines were regarded as unsafe, and useful only for short-range coastal point defense. However, the small Japanese submarine force required a support vessel, and Karasaki was modified for this role.

== Design ==
Karasaki had an overall length of 127.7 m (419 ft 0 in), and beam of 15.2 m (49 ft 10 in), with a nominal displacement of 9,570 long tons (9,724 t) and draught of 4.85 m (15 ft 11 in). She had a clipper bow, single stack, and two masts for auxiliary sail propulsion.

== Operational career ==
Karasaki was launched on 30 January 1896 by the Hawthorn Leslie and Company of Newcastle on Tyne in the United Kingdom, as a combined passenger/cargo vessel ship named the SS Ekaterinoslav (Russian: Екатеринослав) for the Russian Volunteer Fleet, a ship transport association established in the Russian Empire in 1878, and funded from voluntary contributions collected by subscription.

On 6 February 1904, two days before the official start of the Russo-Japanese War, Ekaterinoslav was captured by the Imperial Japanese Navy off Busan. Due to her relatively new age, good condition and large capacity, she was immediately pressed into service as a transport with the unofficial name of Karasaki Maru, moving troops and war materials from the Japanese home islands to the Korean Peninsula and the Liaodong Peninsula in support of the Imperial Japanese Army. She served in this capacity to October 1904.

At the end of 1904, Karasaki Maru was sent to the Yokosuka Naval Arsenal for conversion into a submarine tender. She was officially commissioned into the Imperial Japanese Navy on 4 July 1905. On 8 March 1906, she was renamed Karasaki, and was officially re-designated as a torpedo boat tender. In August 1912, the Imperial Japanese Navy abolished the torpedo boat tender classification, and Karasaki was re-designated as a second-class kaibokan. However, the designation of torpedo boat tender was revived in April 1920. From 1924, Karasaki was then assigned to the submarine training school at Kure Naval District, and from 1 December 1924, was again officially designated as a submarine tender.

Karasaki was transferred to the reserves from 15 November 1934. She was struck from the Navy Directory on 1 April 1939. Her demilitarized hulk was named Haikan No.9 and was moored at Kure Naval Base as a floating barracks. She was scrapped in 1942.
