= Naval War College (Japan) =

Staff college of the Imperial Japanese Navy

- 海軍大学校; Kaigun Daigakkō
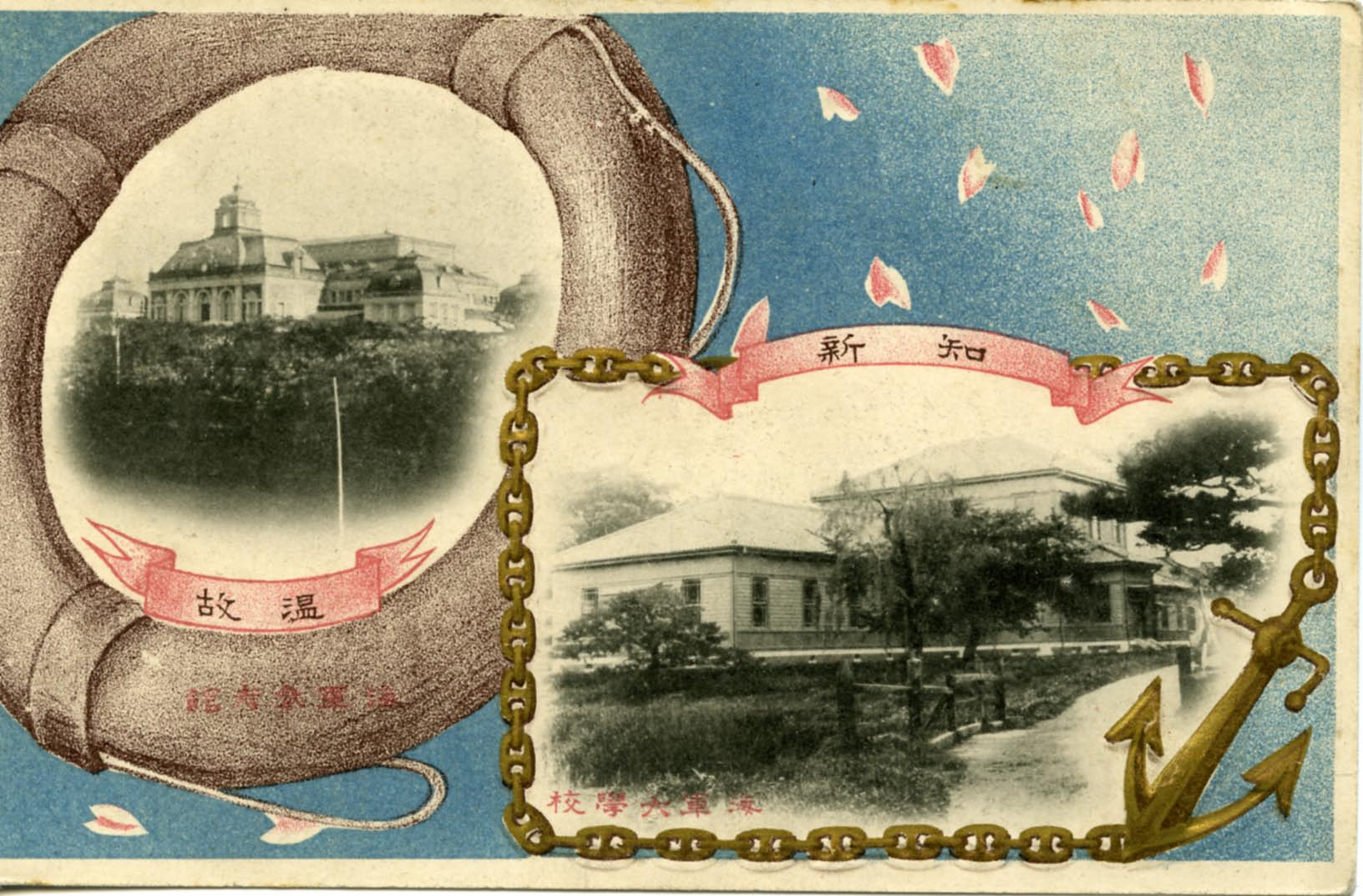
- Commemorative postcard showing Naval Museum (left) and Naval War College (right), circa 1900
- Type: War College
- Active: 1888–1945
- Affiliations: Imperial Japanese Navy
- Location: Tokyo, Japan

The Naval War College (海軍大学校, Kaigun Daigakkō), Short form: 海大 Kaidai) was the staff college of the Imperial Japanese Navy, responsible for training officers for command positions either on warships, or in staff roles.

In the 1880s, the Imperial Japanese Navy realized the need for post-graduate study by officer graduates of the Imperial Japanese Naval Academy. Naval Minister Saigō Tsugumichi authorized the formation of the Naval War College on 14 July 1888 in Tsukiji, Tokyo, and the College accepted its first class from 28 August 1888. The same year the Imperial Japanese Naval Academy moved from Tsukiji to Etajima in Hiroshima Prefecture.

The Navy turned to the United Kingdom for assistance in modernizing and Westernizing, and the Royal Navy provided military advisors to assist in the development of the curriculum. The first director of the Naval War College was Inoue Kaoru and one of the foremost of the early foreign advisors was Captain John Ingles, who lectured at the college from 1887 to 1893. Ingles not only introduced the elements of western tactics, but also stressed the importance of command officers in mathematics, physics, and the technologies necessary to operate steam warships.

The original facilities of the Naval War College were destroyed by the 1923 Great Kantō earthquake. On 27 August 1932, the Naval War College moved into new facilities located in Kamiōsaki, Shinagawa, Tokyo.

In comparison with the Army War College, it took longer for navy officers to apply for admission to the Navy War College. A lieutenant or lieutenant commander could apply only after ten years of active service after graduation from the Imperial Japanese Naval Academy. Within that ten-year period, most applicants also graduated from one or more specialized technical training schools, such as naval artillery or torpedo school, with courses lasting six months each. The Naval War College itself was a one-year course.

The Naval War College was disestablished in May 1945, even before the end of World War II. Its buildings were turned over to the National Institute of Infectious Diseases under the Ministry of Health, and were demolished in 1999. The Japan Coast Guard Academy, located in Kure, inherited its library of some 8000 volumes.

== See also ==
- Imperial Japanese Naval Academy
- List of graduates of the Japanese Imperial Military Academies
