= Battle of Shanghai order of battle =

The following is the order of battle of the forces involved in the Battle of Shanghai, during the opening stages of the Second Sino-Japanese War.

== Order of battle prior to August 13, 1937 ==
=== China ===
National Revolutionary Army

- Wusung – Shanghai Siege Area (Aug. 7 1937)
- Nanking Shanghai Garrison – Zhang Zhizhong (50,000 men).

36th Division – Song Xilian [g]
87th Division – Wang Chingchin [g]
88th Division – Sun Yuanliang [g]
55th Division – Li Sungchan
56th Division – Liu Hoting (later Liu Shangchih)
57th Division – Yuan Chaochang [R]
20th Sep. Bde – Gen. Chen Mienwu
[g] German trained Reorganized Divisions
[R] Reorganized Divisions

- Shanghai City demilitarised on Chinese side according to Shanghai Ceasefire Agreement (1932)

- Wusong-Shanghai Garrison Units (Peace Preservation Corps)

Centralized Chinese Air Force Units (includes former aviators of various warlord air forces and Chinese-American Volunteers)

- Zhoujiakou Airbase, Zhoukou, Henan – 4th Pursuit Group - Col. Gao Zhihang (21st, 22nd, 23rd Pursuit Squadrons).
- Jurong Airbase, Nanjing, Jiangsu - 3rd Pursuit Group - Capt. Wong Pan-Yang (8th, 17th Pursuit Squadrons and 34th Provisional PS) - 5th Pursuit Group - Capt. Chan Kee-Wong (28th PS)

=== Japan ===
Imperial Japanese Navy

3rd Fleet : Admiral Kiyoshi Hasegawa

- Flagship: Izumo (Izumo class armoured cruiser)
- Notoro (seaplane tender)
  - 8 Nakajima E8N Reconnaissance float aircraft
- 11th (Gunboat) Sentai - Rear Admiral Tanimoto Umataro
  - Flagship: Yaeyama (minelayer)
  - Ataka (Gunboat)
  - Katada (Gunboat)
  - Sumida (Gunboat)
  - Kuri (Momi class destroyer)
  - Hozu (Gunboat)
  - Futami (Gunboat)
  - Kotaka (Gunboat)
  - Tsuga (Momi class destroyer)
  - Hasu (Momi class destroyer)
  - Atami (Gunboat)
  - Seta (Gunboat
  - Toba (Gunboat)
  - Hira (Gunboat)
- 8th (Cruiser) Sentai - Rear Admiral Nagumo
  - Flagship: Kinu
  - Natori
  - Yura
- 1st (Destroyer) Sentai - Rear Admiral Yoshida
  - Sendai
- Shanghai Special Naval Landing Force - Rear Admiral Denshichi Okawachi

- 1st Battalion - Lt. Cdr. Uroku Hashimoto
- 2nd Battalion - Lt. Shigeshi Sano
- 3rd Battalion - Lt. Shegeru Ito
- 4th Battalion - Artillery unit, Disbanded at the outbreak of war, guns were dispersed to the infantry units.
- 9th Battalion - Lt. Cdr. Torashige Tsukioka
10th Battalion - Lt. Cdr Haji Kitaro
Prior to hostilities: Total force (2,500 men)

- Special Naval Landing Force reinforcements as of 8/1/37 from 3rd Fleet

- 8th Sentai NLF
- 1st Destroyer Sentai NLF
- 3rd Destroyer Sentai NLF
- Izumo NLF

- Reservists and volunteers (5000 men)

- 1st Reserve Infantry Regiment
- 2nd Reserve Infantry Regiment
(Armed reservists were men in civilian clothes distinguished by a brassard)

- Notes:

Third Fleet operated in Central and South China waters.
11th Squadron evacuated Japanese civilians from the interior to Shanghai during July and early August.

== Order of battle soon after August 13, 1937 ==
=== China ===
National Revolutionary Army

3rd Military Region - Generalissimo Chiang Kai-shek (20 Aug 1937)

Wusung – Shanghai Siege Area

- 9th Group Army - Gen. Zhang Zhizhong

- 36th Division - Gen. Song Xilian [g]
- 56th Division - Gen. Liu Hoting (later Liu Shang-chih)
- 87th Division - Gen. Wang Chingchin [g]
- 88th Division - Gen. Sun Yuanliang [g]
- 20th Separate Brigade - Gen. Chen Mienwu
- Training Division (2nd Regiment) - Gen Huei Yungching
- Wusong-Shanghai Garrison Units (Peace Preservation Corps) - Gen. Chi Chang-chien
- Shanghai City Police Force - Lung Hsiang
- Shanghai City Guard Regiment - Chiang Huai-su
- Cadre Corps of the Military and Political Department
- 10th Heavy Artillery Regiment [sFH 18 L/32 150mm Howitzer] - Gen. Peng Meng-chi
- 3rd Artillery Regiment
- 8th Artillery Regiment
- 2 Heavy Mortar Units
- 2 Anti-tank batteries
- 1 Light Tank Battalion

Yangtze River Right Bank Garrison Sector

- 54th Army – Gen. Huo Kweichang

- 11th Division – Gen. Peng Shan [R]
- 14th Division - Gen. Chen Lie [g]
- 67th Division - Gen. Huang Wei [R]
- 98th Division - Gen. Hsia Chu-chung
- 16th Artillery Regiment (under command of Siege Area)

Reserve Corps of the 15th Group Army

- 74th Army - Yu Chishi

- 51st Division - Wang Yaowu
- 58th Division - Yu Chishih

- 6th Division - Chao Ai

Yangtze River Left Bank Garrison Sector

- 57th Army – Miao Chengliu

- 111th Division – Gen. Chen Ento
- 112th Division – Gen. Huo Shuoyi

Hangzhou Bay Left Bank Garrison Sector

- 8th Group Army – Gen. Zhang Fakui

- 45th Division
- 61st Division – Gen. Chung Sung
- 62nd Division – Gen. Tao Liu
- 55th Division – Gen. Li Sungshan
- 57th Division – Gen. Yuan Shaochang [R]
- 45th Separate Brigade – Gen. Chan Luanchi
- 2nd Artillery Brigade

East Zhejiang Garrison Sector

- 10th Group Army – Gen. Liu Jianxu

- 16th Division – Gen. Peng Shungling
- 63rd Division – Gen. Chen Kuangchung
- 19th Division – Gen. Li Chue
- 52nd Division – Gen. Lu Xinjung
- New 34th Division (128th Division) – Gen. Gu Chiachi
- 37th Separate Brigade – Gen. Chen The-fa
- 11th Provisional Brigade – Gen Chou Xiching
- 12th Provisional Brigade – Gen. Li Kuochun
- 13th Provisional Brigade – Gen. Yang Yungching
[g] German trained Reorganized Divisions
[R] Reorganized Divisions

Chinese Air Force Units - includes former aviators of various warlord air forces plus Chinese-American Volunteers

- Jianqiao Airbase, Hangzhou, Zhejiang – 4th Pursuit Group - Col. Gao Zhihang (21st, 22nd, 23rd Pursuit Squadrons); Capt. Li Guidan assumed command of the 4th PG following Col. Gao's combat injuries sustained on 15 August, that put him out of action for two months.
- Jurong Airbase, Nanjing, Jiangsu - 3rd Pursuit Group - Capt. Wong Pan-Yang (8th, 17th Pursuit Squadrons and 34th Provisional PS) - 5th Pursuit Group - Capt. Chan Kee-Wong (28th PS)

=== Japan ===
Imperial Japanese Navy

- Shanghai Special Naval Landing Force - Rear Admiral Denshichi Okawachi

- 1st Battalion
- 2nd Battalion
- 3rd Battalion
- 4th Battalion
- 9th Battalion

- Special Naval Landing Force reinforcements as of 1 Aug from 3rd Fleet

- 8th Sentai NLF
- 1st Destroyer Sentai NLF
- 3rd Destroyer Sentai NLF
- Izumo NLF

- Special Naval Landing Force reinforcements 18 - 19 Aug

- 5th Battalion (Sasebo 1st SNLF, 16th Destroyer Division)
- 6th Battalion (Kure 2nd SNLF)
- 7th Battalion (Kure 1st SNLF)
- 8th Battalion (Yokosuka 1st SNLF, 11th Sentai)

- Total Naval personnel 8/19/37 (5000 men)

- Reservists and volunteers (5000 men)

- 1st Reserve Infantry Regiment
- 2nd Reserve Infantry Regiment
(Armed reservists were men in civilian clothes distinguished by a brassard)

- Total force defending the settlement 10,000 men

Imperial Japanese Army

- Shanghai Expeditionary Force – Gen. Iwane Matsui (16 Aug 1937)

- 5th Tank Battalion - Colonel Hosomi

32 Type 89 Medium Tanks, 15 Type 94 Tankettes

- 7th Independent Machine Gun Battalion
- 8th Independent Light Armor Company
- 9th Independent Light Armor Company
- Independent Light Armor Company
- 10th Field Heavy Artillery Regiment

- 24 Type 4 150mm Howitzers

- 4th Army Mortar Battalion

- 150mm mortars (1887) [Taki/PWf]

- Field Operations Anti-aircraft Artillery 3 platoons
- Field Air Defense Team 3rd Battery
- 8th Independent Army Engineer Regiment
- 6th Independent Air Squadron
- Shanghai Dispatch Signal Unit
- 5th Independent Heavy Artillery Brigade

- 48 150mm Howitzers

- 6th Independent heavy artillery Brigade

- 13th Field Heavy Artillery Regiments, 24 Type 4 15cm Howitzers
- 14th Field Heavy Artillery Regiments, 24 Type 4 15cm Howitzers

- Army Logistics Depot

- 3rd Division - Lt. Gen. Fujita (Landed on Aug. 23rd)

- 5th Infantry Brigade

- 6th Infantry Regiment
- 68th Infantry Regiment

- 29th Infantry Brigade

- 18th Infantry Regiment
- 34th Infantry Regiment

- 3rd Field Artillery Regiment
- 3rd Cavalry Regiment
- 3rd Engineer Regiment
- 3rd Transport Regiment

- 11th Division - Lt. Gen. Yamamuro (Landed on Aug. 23rd)

- 10th Infantry Brigade

- 12th Infantry Regiment
- 22nd Infantry Regiment

- 22nd Infantry Brigade

- 43rd Infantry Regiment
- 44th Infantry Regiment

- 11th Mountain Artillery Regiment
- 11th Cavalry Regiment
- 11th Engineer Regiment
- 11th Transport Regiment

- 101st Division - Lt. Gen. Ito (Arrived Sept 7-16, Landed on Sep. 22nd)

- 101st Infantry Brigade

- 101st Infantry Regiment
- 149th Infantry Regiment

- 102nd Infantry Brigade

- 103rd Infantry Regiment
- 157th Infantry Regiment

- 101st Field Artillery Regiment
- 101st Cavalry Regiment
- 101st Engineer Regiment
- 101st Transport Regiment

- 9th Division - Lt. Gen. Yoshizumi (Landed on Sep. 27th)

- 6th Infantry Brigade

- 7th Infantry Regiment
- 35th Infantry Regiment

- 18th Infantry Brigade

- 19th Infantry Regiment
- 36th Infantry Regiment

- 9th Mountain Artillery Regiment
- 9th Cavalry Regiment
- 9th Engineer Regiment
- 9th Transport Regiment

- 13th Division - Lt. Gen. Ogisu (reinforcements late Aug., Landed on Oct. 1st)

- 26th Infantry Brigade

- 58th Infantry Regiment
- 116th Infantry Regiment

- 103rd Infantry Brigade

- 65th Infantry Regiment
- 104th Infantry Regiment

- 19th Mountain Artillery Regiment
- 17th Cavalry Regiment
- 13th Engineer Regiment
- 13th Transport Regiment

== Later forces ==
=== Chinese forces after late September, 1937 ===
National Revolutionary Army

3rd Military Region - Generalisimo Chiang Kai-shek (after late Sept. 1937)

- Right Wing Force - General Zhang Fakui

- 8th Group Army - General Zhang Fakui

- 28th Army - Tao Kuang

- 62nd Division – Tao Kuang
- 63rd Division – Chen Kuangchung

- 55th Division – Li Sungchan
- 79th Division
- 67th Army

- 107th Division
- 108th Division

- 45th Separate Brigade – Chang Luanchi
- Artillery Btn., Training Div.
- 2nd Artillery Brigade – Ts`ai Chunghu

- 10th Group Army - Liu Jianxu

- 11th Reserve Division – Hu –Ta
- New 34th Division (128th Division) – Ku Chiachi
- 45th Division – Tai Minchuan
- 52nd Division – Lu Xinjung
- 11th Provisional Brigade – Chou Xiching
- 12th Provisional Brigade – Li Kuochun
- 13th Provisional Brigade – Yang Yungching
- 37th Separate Brigade - Chen Thefa
- Special Forces Regiment – ?
- Ningpo Defense Commander – Wan Kaolan

- Central Force Gen. Zhu Shaoliang

- 9th Group Army - Zhu Shaoliang

- 72nd Army – Sun Yuanliang

- 88th Division – Sun Yuanliang[g]
- Peace Preservation Corps - Chi Chang-chien
- 1st Regiment, 20th Separate Brigade

- 78th Army – Song Xilian

- 36th Division – Song Xilian[g]

- 71st Army – Wang Chingchin

- 87th Division – Wang Chingchin[g]

- 8th Army – Huang Chie

- 61st Division – Chung Sung
- Salt Gabelle Division – Huang Chie

- 3rd Division – Li Yutang[g]
- 18th Division – Chu Yao-hua
- 135th Division
- 46th Division
- 156th Division
- Training Division – Huei Yungching
- Shanghai Garrison Command - Yang Hu
- 1st Battalion 3rd Regiment, 2nd Artillery Brigade
- 2 Heavy Mortar Units
- 2 Anti-tank batteries
- 1 Light tank Battalion

- 21st Group Army - Liao Lei

- 1st Army – Hu Zongnan

- 1st Division - Li Tiechun
- 32nd Division - Wang Xiushen
- 78th Division - Li Wen

- 48th Army – Wei Yunsung

- 173rd Division - Huo Weichen
- 174th Division - Wang Tsanpin
- 176th Division - Ou Shounien

- 7th Army

- 170th Division
- 171st Division – Yang Cunchang
- 172nd Division

- 19th Division – Li Chue
- 16th Division – Peng Sungling

- Left Wing Force - General Chen Cheng

- 19th Group Army – Xue Yue

- 66th Army – Ye Zhao

- 159th Division – Tan Sui
- 160th Division – Ye Zhao
- Training Brigade

- 75th Army – Chao Ai

- 6th Division – Chao Ai[g]

- 2nd Army – Li Yannian

- 9th Division – Li Yannian[g]
- 105th Division

- 25th Army – Wan Yaohuang

- 13th Division – Wan Yaohuang

- 20th Army – Yang Sen

- 133rd Division – Yang Hanyu
- 134th Division – Yang Hanchung

- 69th Army – Yuan Chaochang

- 57th Division – Yuan Chaochang[R]

- 154th Division – Wu Chien-hsiung
- 109th Division
- 4th Jiangsu Peace Preservation Regiment

- 15th Group Army – Luo Zhuoying

- 44th Division – Chen Yung
- 8th Division – T'ao Chih-yüeh
- 77th Division – Luo Lin
- 16th Artillery Regiment
- 16th Corps – Luo Zhuoying

- 18th Army - Luo Zhuoying

- 60th Division - Chen Pei
- 11th Division - Peng Shan[R]
- 67th Division - Huang Wei[R]

- 54th Army - Huo Kueichang

- 14th Division - Chen Lie[g]
- 98th Division - Hsia Chu-chung

- 74th Army - Yu Chishi

- 51st Division - Wang Yaowu
- 58th Division - Yu Chishih

- 39th Army – Liu Ho-ting

- 34th Separate Brigade. – Lo Chichiang
- 56th Division - Liu Shangchih

- 4th Army – Wu Chi-wei

- 59th Division – Han Hanying
- 90th Division – Ou Chen

- 73rd Army – Wang Tungyuan

- 15th Division – Wang Chihpin

- 15th Corps – Liu Xing

- 102nd Division - Po Huichang
- 103rd Division - Ho Chihchung
- 53rd Division - Li Yunheng
- 23rd Division - Li Pifan

- 57th Army – Miao Chengliu

- 111th Division - Chang Entuo
- 112th Division - Huo Shouyi

- River Defence Forces - Gen. Liu Xing

- Chiangyin Fortress Command - Xu Kang
- Chenchiang Fortress Command - Lin Xienyang
- 2nd Regiment Kiangsu Peace Preservation Force
- 1st Battalion 8th Artillery Regiment
- 11th Corps - Shangguan Yunxiang

- 40th Division - Liu Peixu
- 33rd Division - Ma Xingxien

- 12th Corps - Chang Fang

- 76th Division - Wang Lingyun
- 43rd Army - Kuo Jutung

- 26th Div. - Liu Yuching

- 1st Battalion 3rd Artillery Regiment
- 4th Artillery Regiment
- 1st Battalion 10th Heavy Artillery Regiment [sFH 18 L/32 150mm How]
Notes:
[g] German trained Reorganized Divisions:
[R] Reorganized Divisions

=== Japanese forces from October 29, 1937 ===
Imperial Japanese Army

Central China Front Army – Gen. Iwane Matsui

(was formed on Oct. 29th 1937 to coordinate the Shanghai Expeditionary Army and
the 10th Army.)

- Shanghai Expeditionary Force - Gen. Iwane Matsui,

- See previous order of battle
- 16th Division – Gen. Kesao Nakashima (from N. China Nov 12/37, landed at Pai mao kou)

- 19th Infantry Brigade

- 9th Infantry Regiment
- 20th Infantry Regiment

- 30th Infantry Brigade

- 33rd Infantry Regiment
- 38th Infantry Regiment

- 22nd Field Artillery Regiment
- 20th Cavalry Regiment
- 16th Engineer Regiment
- 16th Transport Regiment

- Shigeto Detachment - Major Gen. Shigeto (arrived Sept 7-16 from Formosa)

- Regiment sized, was later expanded into the Formosa Mixed Brigade. Nov 12/37, landed at Pai mao kou)

- ? Manchukuoan Brigade - Li Chung-shan (arrived Sept. 7-16)
- ? Manchukuoan Brigade - Yu Chih-shan (arrived Sept. 7-16)

- 10th Army – Major Gen. Heisuke Yamagawa (Nov. 5th landing at Chin shan wei)

- 9th Independent Light Armor Company [Taki/ PWf]
- 2nd Independent Mountain Gun Regiment[Taki/ PWf]
- 6th Independent Heavy Artillery Brigade [CDF] [Taki/ PWf]

- 13th Field Heavy Artillery Regiment, 24 Type 4 15cm Howitzers
- 14th Field Heavy Artillery Regiment, 24 Type 4 15cm Howitzers

- 6th Division - Lt. Gen. Tani

- 11th Infantry Brigade

- 13th Infantry Regiment
- 47th Infantry Regiment

- 36th Infantry Brigade

- 23rd Infantry Regiment
- 45th Infantry Regiment

- 6th Field Artillery Regiment
- 6th Cavalry Regiment
- 6th Engineer Regiment
- 6th Transport Regiment

- 18th Division - Lt. Gen. Ushijima

- 23rd Infantry Brigade

- 55th Infantry Regiment
- 56th Infantry Regiment

- 35th Infantry Brigade

- 114th Infantry Regiment
- 124th Infantry Regiment

- 18th Mountain Artillery Regiment
- 22nd Cavalry Battalion
- 12th Engineer Regiment
- 12th Transport Regiment

- 114th Division - Lt. Gen. Suematsu

- 127th Infantry Brigade

- 66th Infantry Regiment
- 115th Infantry Regiment

- 128th Infantry Brigade

- 102nd Infantry Regiment
- 150th Infantry Regiment

- 120th Field Artillery Regt
- 118th Cavalry Regiment
- 114th Engineer Regiment
- 114th Transport Regiment

- Kunizaki Detachment - Gen. Kunisaki (from North China)

- 9th Infantry Brigade/5th Division

- 11th Infantry Regiment
- 41st Infantry Regiment

- with elements of:

5th Mountain Artillery Regiment
5th Cavalry Regiment
5th Engineer Regiment
5th Transport Regiment

== Sources ==
- Hsu Long-hsuen and Chang Ming-kai, History of The Sino-Japanese War (1937-1945) 2nd Ed., 1971. Translated by Wen Ha-hsiung, Chung Wu Publishing; 33, 140th Lane, Tung-hwa Street, Taipei, Taiwan Republic of China. Pg. 200 - 214, Map 7.
- Jowett, Phillip S., Rays of The Rising Sun, Armed Forces of Japan’s Asian Allies 1931-45, Volume I: China & Manchuria, 2004. Helion & Co. Ltd., 26 Willow Rd., Solihull, West Midlands, England.
- Sino-Japanese Air War 1937-45
- History of the Frontal War Zone in the Sino-Japanese War, published by Nanjing University Press.
  - [g] German trained Reorganized Divisions:

3rd, 6th, 9th, 14th, 36th, 87th, 88th, and the Training Division of the Central Military Academy.

Also the "Tax Police" regiment (equivalent of a division) under T.V. Soong's Ministry of Finance, later converted to the New 38th Division during the war, were German armed and trained by German officers.

  - [R] Reorganized Divisions were the other 12 other Divisions with Chinese arms on the reorganized model with 2 German advisors:

2nd, 4th, 10th, 11th, 25th, 27th, 57th, 67th, 80th, 83rd, 89th Division

- Madej, W. Victor, Japanese Armed Forces Order of Battle, 1937-1945 [2 vols], Allentown, PA: 1981.
