= China Area Fleet =

Fleet of the Imperial Japanese Navy

- Active: 20 October 1937 – 9 September 1945
- Country: Empire of Japan
- Branch: Imperial Japanese Navy
- Battle honours: Pacific Theatre of World War II

Commanders
- Notable commanders: Koshirō Oikawa; Shigetarō Shimada; Mineichi Koga; Zengo Yoshida; Nobutake Kondō

The China Area Fleet (支那方面艦隊, Shina Hōmen Kantai) was a fleet of the Imperial Japanese Navy organized after the Battle of Shanghai. It reported directly to the Imperial General Headquarters and had the same organizational level as the Combined Fleet. This article handles their predecessor fleet the Southern Qing Fleet (南清艦隊, Nanshin Kantai), China Expeditionary Fleet (遣支艦隊, Kenshi Kantai) and 1st/2nd Expeditionary Fleet (第一/第二遣外艦隊, Daiichi/Daini Kengai Kantai) also.

== Organizations of the China Area Fleet and Subordinate Units ==
=== China Area Fleet ===
==== Structure (extract) ====
Date	Higher unit	Lower units, vessels and elements
20 October 1937 (original)	Imperial General Headquarters	3rd Fleet, 4th Fleet, 1st Carrier Division, 2nd Carrier Division, 3rd Carrier Division, 1st Combined Air Group, 2nd Combined Air Group
1 February 1938	Imperial General Headquarters	3rd Fleet, 4th Fleet, 5th Fleet
15 November 1939	Imperial General Headquarters	1st China Expeditionary Fleet, 2nd China Expeditionary Fleet, 3rd China Expeditionary Fleet, 13th Division, 2nd Combined Air Group, Shanghai Area Base Force, Shanghai Special Naval Landing Force
10 December 1941	Imperial General Headquarters	Coast defence ship Izumo, 1st China Expeditionary Fleet, 2nd China Expeditionary Fleet, 3rd China Expeditionary Fleet, 13th Gunboat Division, 14th Gunboat Division, 1st Motor gunboat Division, 2nd Motor gunboat Division, Shanghai Area Base Force, Shanghai Special Naval Landing Force, Zhōushān Island Guard Unit, Shanghai Port office
1 April 1943	Imperial General Headquarters	Cruiser Izumo, 1st China Expeditionary Fleet, 2nd China Expeditionary Fleet, Qingdao Area Special Base Force, Shanghai Area Base Force, Shanghai Special Naval Landing Force
1 April 1944	Imperial General Headquarters	Cruiser Izumo, 2nd China Expeditionary Fleet, Qingdao Area Special Base Force, Shanghai Area Base Force, Yangtze River Area Base Force, Shanghai Special Naval Landing Force, Shanghai Naval Air Group, Qingdao Naval Air Group, 256th Naval Air Group, 2nd Weather Observation Unit
1 June 1945	Supreme Headquarters of the Navy	2nd China Expeditionary Fleet, Qingdao Area Special Base Force, Shanghai Area Base Force, Yangtze River Area Base Force, Shanghai Special Naval Landing Force
9 September 1945	Surrendered.	

==== Commanders of the China Area Fleet ====
#	Commander-in-Chief	Dates		Previous Post	Next Post	Notes
1	Admiral; Hasegawa Kiyoshi 長谷川清	20 October 1937	25 April 1938	3rd Fleet	Commander-in-chief; Yokosuka Naval District	Remained Commander-in-chief 3rd Fleet for duration of posting.
2	Vice-Admiral; Oikawa Koshirō 及川古志郎	25 April 1938	1 May 1940	Director; Naval Aviation Bureau	Commander-in-chief; Yokosuka Naval District	Also Commander-in-chief 3rd Fleet until 15 November 1939; Promoted to Admiral 15 November 1939
3	Vice-Admiral; Shimada Shigetarō 嶋田繁太郎	1 May 1940	1 September 1941	Commander-in-chief; Kure Naval District	Commander-in-chief; Yokosuka Naval District	Promoted to Admiral 15 November 1940
4	Vice-Admiral; Koga Mineichi 古賀峯一	1 September 1941	10 November 1942	Commander-in-chief; 2nd Fleet	Commander-in-chief; Yokosuka Naval District	Promoted to Admiral 1 May 1942
5	Admiral; Yoshida Zengo 吉田善吾	10 November 1942	1 December 1943	Naval Councilor	Naval Councilor	
6	Admiral; Kondō Nobutake 近藤信竹	1 December 1943	15 May 1945	Naval Councilor	Naval Councilor	
7	Vice-Admiral; Fukuda Ryōzō 福田良三	15 May 1945	9 September 1945	Commander-in-chief; Takao Guard District		

- Chief of staff

#	Rank	Name	Date	Note, additional post
1	Rear-Admiral	Rokuzō Sugiyama	20 October 1937	Chief of staff of the 3rd Fleet
2	Rear-Admiral	Jinichi Kusaka	25 April 1938	Chief of staff of the 3rd Fleet
3	Rear-Admiral; Vice-Admiral	Shigeyoshi Inoue	23 October 1939; 15 November 1939	Chief of staff of the 3rd Fleet
4	Rear-Admiral; Vice-Admiral	Denshichi Ōkawachi	1 October 1940; 15 November 1940	
5	Vice-Admiral	Minoru Tayui	16 March 1942	
6	Vice-Admiral	Kanji Ugaki	1 September 1943	
7	Vice-Admiral	Naomasa Sakonju	15 December 1944	

=== 1st China Expeditionary Fleet ===
The 1st China Expeditionary Fleet (第一遣支艦隊, Dai-Ichi Kenshi Kantai) was reorganized from the 3rd Fleet on 15 November 1939. Their role was the guard of the coast in China at first, however, it changed for the guard in the down stream area of the Yangtze River. Describe 3rd Fleet, 1st China Expeditionary Fleet and successor unit the Yangtze River Area Base Force (揚子江方面根拠地隊, Yōsukō Hōmen Konkyochitai) in this section.

- Structure (extract)

Date	Higher unit	Unit name	Lower units, vessels and elements
2 February 1932 (original)	Imperial Japanese Navy General Staff	3rd Fleet	Coast defence ship Izumo, Cruiser Ōi, Tatsuta, Collier Muroto, Collier Noshima, Oiler Notoro, Naruto, Food supply ship Mamiya, 1st Expeditionary Fleet, 2nd Expeditionary Fleet, 3rd Division, 1st Carrier Division, 1st Destroyer Squadron, 26th Destroyer Division
20 October 1937	China Area Fleet	3rd Fleet	Coast defence ship Izumo, 11th Division, 3rd Destroyer Squadron, Shanghai Special Naval Landing Force
15 November 1939	China Area Fleet	1st China Expeditionary Fleet (renamed and reorganized)	11th Division, Hankou Area Base Force, Jiujiang Base Unit
15 November 1940	China Area Fleet	1st China Expeditionary Fleet	Gunboat Ataka, Seta, Hira, Katada, Hozu, Atami, Futami, Fushimi, Sumida, Hankou Area Base Force
20 August 1943	China Area Fleet	Yangtze River Area Base Force (renamed and reorganized)	Gunboat Fushimi, Sumida, Seta, Hira, Katada, Hozu, Atami, Futami, Suma, Tatara, Narumi, Jiujiang Guard Unit
1 June 1945	China Area Fleet	Yangtze River Area Base Force	Gunboat Fushimi, Sumida, 21st Gunboat Division, 22nd Gunboat Division, 23rd Gunboat Division, 24th Gunboat Division, Jiujiang Guard Unit
9 September 1945	Surrendered.		

Commanders of the 3rd Fleet

	Commander-in-Chief	Dates		Previous Post	Next Post	Notes
1	Vice-Admiral; Nomura Kichisaburō 野村吉三郎	2 February 1932	28 June 1932	Commander-in-chief; Yokosuka Naval District	Commander-in-chief; Yokosuka Naval District	Relieved after being blinded in eye during the Hongkou Park bombing 29 April 1932.
2	Vice-Admiral; Sakonji Seizō 左近司政三	28 June 1932	1 December 1932		Commander-in-chief; Sasebo Naval District	
3	Vice-Admiral; Mitsumasa Yonai 米内光政	1 December 1932	15 September 1933	Commander; Chinkai Guard District	Attendant; Navy General Staff	
4	Vice-Admiral; Imamura Nobujirō	15 September 1933	15 November 1934		Commander-in-chief; Sasebo Naval District	
5	Vice-Admiral; Hyakutake Gengo 百武源吾	15 November 1934	1 December 1935	Commander-in-chief; Maizuru Guard District	Commander-in-chief; Sasebo Naval District	
6	Vice-Admiral; Oikawa Koshirō 及川古志郎	1 December 1935	1 December 1936		Director; Naval Aviation Bureau	
7	Admiral; Hasegawa Kiyoshi 長谷川清	1 December 1936	25 April 1938	Vice-Minister of the Navy	Commander-in-chief; Yokosuka Naval District	Also Commander-in-chief China Area Fleet after 20 October 1937
8	Vice-Admiral; Oikawa Koshirō 及川古志郎	25 April 1938	15 November 1939	Chief; Naval Aviation Bureau	Commander-in-chief; China Area Fleet	Also Commander-in-chief China Area Fleet

Commander in chief 1st China Expeditionary Fleet and commander (Yangtze River Area Base Force)

	Rank	Name	Date	Note, additional post
9	Vice-Admiral	Umatarō Tanimoto	15 November 1939	Commander of the 11th Division
10	Vice-Admiral	Boshirō Hosogaya	15 November 1940	
11	Vice-Admiral	Marquis Teruhisa Komatsu	5 July 1941	
12	Vice-Admiral	Kakusaburō Makita	14 February 1942	
13	Vice-Admiral	Yoshikazu Endō	9 March 1943	
14	Vice-Admiral	Ichirō Ōno	20 August 1943	
15	Vice-Admiral	Kōichirō Hatakeyama	20 March 1944	
16	Vice-Admiral	Torao Sawada	21 November 1944	

- Chief of staff (3rd Fleet and 1st China Expeditionary Fleet)

	Rank	Name	Date	Note, additional post
1	Rear-Admiral	Shigetarō Shimada	2 February 1932	
2	Captain; Rear-Admiral	Shigeru Kikuno	28 June 1932; 1 December 1932	
3	Rear-Admiral	Seizaburō Mitsui	1 April 1933	
4	Captain	Shirō Takasu	15 November 1933	
5	Captain; Rear-Admiral	Eijirō Kondō	15 November 1934; 15 November 1935	
6	Rear-Admiral	Seiichi Iwamura	2 December 1935	
7	Captain; Rear-Admiral	Rokuzō Sugiyama	16 November 1936; 1 December 1936; 20 October 1937	Chief of staff of the China Area Fleet
8	Rear-Admiral	Jin'ichi Kusaka	25 April 1938	Chief of staff of the China Area Fleet
9	Rear-Admiral	Shigeyoshi Inoue	23 October 1939	Chief of staff of the China Area Fleet
10	Rear-Admiral	Shigenori Horiuchi	15 November 1939	
11	Captain; Rear-Admiral	Shin'ichi Ichise	15 October 1940; 15 November 1940; 11 August 1941; 15 January 1942	Commander of the Hankou Area Base Force
12	Rear-Admiral	Gunji Kogure	25 July 1942	
x	Demotion to Area Base Force.		20 August 1943	

=== 2nd China Expeditionary Fleet ===
The 2nd China Expeditionary Fleet (第二遣支艦隊, Dai-Ni Kenshi Kantai) was reorganized from the 5th Fleet on 15 November 1939. The 5th Fleet was reinforcements for 3rd Fleet and 4th Fleet. Their role was the guard and invasion of South China. The 2nd China Expeditionary Fleet kept appearance of a fleet until the end of war.

- Structure (extract)

Date	Higher unit	Unit name	Lower units, vessels and elements
1 February 1938 (original)	China Area Fleet	5th Fleet	9th Division, 10th Division, 3rd Carrier Division, 4th Carrier Division, 5th Destroyer Squadron
15 December 1938	China Area Fleet	5th Fleet	9th Division, 5th Destroyer Squadron, C.M. Seaplane tender Kamikawa Maru, 3rd Combined Air Group, 14th Air Group, 16th Air Group, 2nd Base Force, 3rd Base Force
15 November 1939	China Area Fleet	2nd China Expeditionary Fleet (renamed and reorganized)	15th Division, 3rd Combined Air Group, Xiamen Area Base Force, Guangdong Area Base Force, Hainan Area Base Force
10 December 1941	China Area Fleet	2nd China Expeditionary Fleet	15th Division, Xiamen Base Force, Guangdong Base Force
1 January 1944	China Area Fleet	2nd China Expeditionary Fleet	Gunboat Saga, Hashidate, Hong Kong Special Base Force, Hong Kong Port office, Guangdong Guard Unit, Hainan Guard Unit, 254th Naval Air Group, 15th Guard Unit, 16th Guard Unit, 4th Yokosuka Special Naval Landing Force, 1st Sasebo Special Naval Landing Force, 1st Maizuru Special Naval Landing Force
9 September 1945	Surrendered.		

==== Commanders of the 5th Fleet ====
	Commander-in-Chief	Dates		Previous Post	Next Post	Notes
1	Vice-Admiral; Shiozawa Kōichi 塩沢幸一	1 February 1938	15 December 1938	Attendant; Navy General Staff	Director; Navy Technical Bureau	
2	Vice-Admiral; Kondō Nobutake 近藤信竹	15 December 1938	29 September 1939		Attendant; Navy General Staff	
3	Vice-Admiral; Takasu Shirō 高須四郎	29 September 1939	15 November 1939	Headmaster; Naval War College	Commander-in-chief; 2nd China Expeditionary Fleet	

==== Commanders of the 2nd China Expeditionary Fleet ====
	Rank	Name	Date	Note, additional post
3	Vice-Admiral	Shirō Takasu	15 November 1939	
4	Vice-Admiral	Yorio Sawamoto	15 October 1940	
5	Vice-Admiral	Masaichi Niimi	4 April 1941	
6	Vice-Admiral	Kiyoshi Hara	14 July 1942	
7	Vice-Admiral	Daisuke Soejima	21 June 1943	
8	Vice-Admiral	Ruitarō Fujita	25 April 1945	

- Chief of staff

	Rank	Name	Date	Note, additional post
1	Rear-Admiral	Minoru Tayui	1 February 1938	
2	Rear-Admiral	Tamon Yamaguchi	15 December 1938	
3	Rear-Admiral	Chūichi Hara	15 November 1939	
4	Captain; Rear-Admiral	Yasuo Yasuba	13 August 1941; 15 October 1941; 10 March 1942	Commander of the Hong Kong Special Base Force
5	Captain; Rear-Admiral	Chōzaemon Obata	1 September 1942; 1 November 1942	Commander of the Hong Kong Special Base Force
6	Captain; Rear-Admiral	Yuzuru Ōkuma	19 October 1943; 1 May 1944	Commander of the Hong Kong Special Base Force

=== 3rd China Expeditionary Fleet ===
The 3rd China Expeditionary Fleet (第三遣支艦隊, Dai-San Kenshi Kantai) was reorganized from the 4th Fleet on 15 November 1939. The 4th Fleet was reinforcements for 3rd Fleet. Their role was the guard in Bohai Sea. Describe 4th Fleet and 3rd China Expeditionary Fleet in this section. The 3rd China Expeditionary Fleet was specialization to guard unit for Qingdao and become extinct.

- Structure (extract)

Date	Higher unit	Unit name	Lower units, vessels and elements
20 October 1937 (original)	China Area Fleet	4th Fleet	Cruiser Ashigara, 9th Division, 14th Division, 4th Destroyer Squadron, 5th Destroyer Squadron
15 December 1938	China Area Fleet	4th Fleet	12th Division, 1st Combined Special Naval Landing Force
15 November 1939	China Area Fleet	3rd China Expeditionary Fleet (renamed and reorganized)	12th Division, Qingdao Area Special Base Force
10 December 1941	China Area Fleet	3rd China Expeditionary Fleet	Coast defence ship Iwate, 11th Torpedo boat Division, Qingdao Area Special Base Force
10 April 1942	Dissolved and reorganized to Qingdao Area Special Base Force.		

Commanders of the 4th Fleet

Commander-in-Chief		Dates		Previous Post	Next Post	Notes
1	Vice-Admiral; Toyoda Soemu 豊田副武	20 October 1937	15 November 1938		Commander-in-chief; 2nd Fleet	
2	Vice-Admiral; Hibino Masaharu	15 November 1938	15 November 1939			

Commanders of the 3rd China Expeditionary Fleet

	Rank	Name	Date	Note, additional post
3	Vice-Admiral	Naokuni Nomura	15 November 1939	
4	Vice-Admiral	Mitsumi Shimizu	30 September 1940	
5	Vice-Admiral	Rokuzō Sugiyama	5 July 1941	
6	Vice-Admiral	Shiro Kawase	16 December 1941	

- Chief of staff

	Rank	Name	Date	Note, additional post
1	Captain; Rear-Admiral	Masami Kobayashi	20 October 1937; 1 December 1937	
2	Captain; Rear-Admiral	Arata Oka	1 September 1938; 15 November 1938	
3	Rear-Admiral	Takeo Tada	15 November 1939	
4	Captain	Shigeji Kaneko	8 August 1940; 10 April 1941	Commander of the Qingdao Area Special Base Force
5	Captain	Masaki Ogata	24 May 1941	Commander of the Qingdao Area Special Base Force
6	Captain	Morikazu Ōsugi	20 August 1941; 15 January 1942	Commander of the Qingdao Area Special Base Force; Commander of the Qingdao Area Special Base Force and Qingdao Guard Unit

== Organizations of pre-China Area Fleet ==
Describe about pre-China Area Fleet in this section. The Southern Qing Fleet, China Expeditionary Fleet, 1st Expeditionary Fleet and 2nd Expeditionary Fleet were ancestor of China Area Fleet.

=== Southern Qing Fleet ===
The Southern Qing Fleet (南清艦隊, Nanshin Kantai) was organized after the Russo-Japanese War. They were reinforced by Xinhai Revolution in 1911, however, Beiyang Government declared neutrality in World War I. All gunboats were detained, and Southern Qing Fleet became extinct before long.

- Structure (extract)

Date	Higher unit	Unit name	Lower units, vessels and elements
20 December 1905 (original)	Imperial Japanese Navy General Staff	Southern Qing Fleet	Cruiser Takachiho, Chitose, Gunboat Uji, Sumida
22 November 1906	Imperial Japanese Navy General Staff	Southern Qing Fleet	Cruiser Takachiho, Akitsushima, Gunboat Uji, Sumida, Fushimi
24 December 1908	Imperial Japanese Navy General Staff	3rd Fleet (renamed)	Cruiser Akashi, Otowa, Gunboat Uji, Sumida, Fushimi
1 December 1911	Imperial Japanese Navy General Staff	3rd Fleet	Cruiser Chiyoda, Niitaka, Suma, Dispatch vessel Mogami, Chihaya, Tatsuta, Gunboat Uji, Sumida, Fushimi, Toba
5 February 1915	Imperial Japanese Navy General Staff	3rd Fleet	Cruiser Kasuga, Tsushima, Akitsushima
23 December 1915	Dissolved.		

- Commander

	Rank	Name	Date	Note, additional post
1	Rear-Admiral	Kunikane Taketomi	20 December 1905	
2	Rear-Admiral	Chikataka Tamari	22 November 1906	
3	Rear-Admiral; Vice-Admiral	Izō Teragaki	22 November 1906; 1 December 1909	
4	Rear-Admiral	Reijirō Kawashima	1 December 1910	
5	Rear-Admiral; Vice-Admiral	Matahachirō Nawa	20 April 1912; 1 December 1912	
6	Rear-Admiral	Mitsukane Tsuchiya	25 March 1914	
7	Vice-Admiral	Takeshi Takarabe	5 February 1915	

- Chief of staff

	Rank	Name	Date	Note, additional post
1	Captain	Hisatsune Iida	13 September 1913; 1 December 1913	Newly established Commanding officer of the cruiser Kasagi
x	Chief of staff was abolished.		27 May 1914	
2	Commander	Yasuhira Yoshikawa	8 August 1914	
x	Chief of staff was abolished.		1 December 1914	

=== China Expeditionary Fleet/1st Expeditionary Fleet ===
The 1st Expeditionary Fleet (第一遣外艦隊, Dai-Ichi Kengai Kantai) was reorganized on 9 August 1919 from China Expeditionary Fleet (遣支艦隊, Kenshi Kantai). Their ancestor was 7th Division (第七戦隊, Dai-Nana Sentai) under World War I. They became 11th Division only for gunboats and became extinct.

- Structure (extract)

Date	Higher unit	Unit name	Lower units, vessels and elements
1 December 1917 (original)	3rd Fleet	7th Division	Cruiser Chitose, Gunboat Uji, Toba, Sumida, Fushimi
10 August 1918	Imperial Japanese Navy General Staff	China Expeditionary Fleet (renamed)	Cruiser Chitose, Gunboat Saga, Uji, Toba, Sumida, Fushimi
9 August 1919	Imperial Japanese Navy General Staff	1st Expeditionary Fleet (renamed)	Cruiser Suma, Gunboat Yodo, Saga, Uji, Toba, Sumida, Fushimi, 29th Destroyer Division
1 December 1924	Imperial Japanese Navy General Staff	1st Expeditionary Fleet	Cruiser Tone, Gunboat Ataka, Saga, Toba, Sumida, Fushimi, Seta, Hira, Hozu
30 November 1929	Imperial Japanese Navy General Staff	1st Expeditionary Fleet	Cruiser Hirado, Yahagi, Gunboat Ataka, Saga, Toba, Sumida, Fushimi, Seta, Hira, Katada, Hozu, Destroyer Urakaze
2 February 1932	3rd Fleet	1st Expeditionary Fleet	Cruiser Hirado, Tsushima, Tenryū, Minelayer Tokiwa, Gunboat Ataka, Uji, Toba, Sumida, Fushimi, Seta, Hira, Katada, Hozu, Atami, 24th Destroyer Division, Destroyer Urakaze
20 May 1933	3rd Fleet	11th Division (renamed)	Cruiser Tsushima, Gunboat Ataka, Uji, Toba, Sumida, Fushimi, Seta, Hira, Katada, Hozu, Atami, Futami, 24th Destroyer Division, Destroyer Urakaze
15 December 1938	3rd Fleet	11th Division	Gunboat Ataka, Toba, Seta, Hira, Katada, Hozu, Atami, Futami, Destroyer Tsuga, Kuri, Hasu, 1st Torpedo Boat Division
15 November 1939	1st China Expeditionary Fleet	11th Division	Gunboat Ataka, Toba, Seta, Hira, Katada, Hozu, Atami, Futami, Fushimi
15 November 1940	Dissolved.		

- Commander

	Rank	Name	Date	Note, additional post
x		Vacant post	1 December 1917	
1	Rear-Admiral	Toyokazu Yamaoka	15 December 1917	
2	Rear-Admiral; Vice-Admiral	Masujirō Yoshida	8 November 1919; 1 December 1920	
3	Rear-Admiral	Kenzō Kobayashi	1 May 1922	
4	Rear-Admiral	Kichisaburō Nomura	15 September 1923	
5	Rear-Admiral	Osami Nagano	20 April 1925	
6	Rear-Admiral	Jirō Araki	20 August 1926	
7	Rear-Admiral	Wataru Ugawa	1 December 1927	
8	Rear-Admiral	Mitsumasa Yonai	10 December 1928	
9	Rear-Admiral	Kōichi Shiozawa	1 December 1930	
10	Rear-Admiral	Tsuneyoshi Sakano	6 June 1932	
11	Rear-Admiral	Teijirō Sugisaka	15 November 1933	
12	Rear-Admiral	Masaharu Hibino	2 December 1935	
13	Rear-Admiral	Umatarō Tanimoto	1 December 1936	
14	Rear-Admiral	Eijirō Kondō	1 December 1937	
15	Rear-Admiral	Rokuzō Sugiyama	15 December 1938	
16	Vice-Admiral	Umatarō Tanimoto	15 November 1939	Commander in chief of the 1st China Expeditionary Fleet

=== 2nd Expeditionary Fleet ===
The 2nd Expeditionary Fleet (第二遣外艦隊, Dai-Ni Kengai Kantai) was organized on 16 May 1927 for reinforcements for 1st Expeditionary Fleet. Their role was the guard of Northern China.

- Structure (extract)

Date	Higher unit	Lower units, vessels and elements
16 May 1927 (original)	Imperial Japanese Navy General Staff	Cruiser Hirado, Tsushima, 9th Destroyer Division
2 February 1932	3rd Fleet	Cruiser Kuma, Coast defence ship Yakumo, 13th Destroyer Division, 16th Destroyer Division
20 April 1933	Dissolved.	

- Commander

	Rank	Name	Date	Note, additional post
1	Rear-Admiral	Susumu Nakajima	16 May 1927	
2	Rear-Admiral	Kin'ichi Mukōda	1 April 1928	
3	Rear-Admiral	Kiyohiro Ijichi	10 December 1928	
4	Rear-Admiral	Shizue Tsuda	21 May 1930	

== Bibliography ==
- Naval Minister's Secretariat/Ministry of the Navy (keep by "Japan Center for Asian Historical Records (JACAR)"., National Archives of Japan)
  - Monograph: Year of 1900 - Extract of naval war history of Qing Incident, each volume
  - Fleet boat division organization and warship torpedo boat deployment, each volume
  - Vessels boat service list, each volume
- Senshi Sōsho each volume, Asagumo Simbun (Japan)
- Rekishi Dokuhon, Special issue No. 33 Overview of admirals of the Imperial Japanese Navy, Shin-Jinbutsuōraisha, 1999
- The Japanese Modern Historical Manuscripts Association, Organizations, structures and personnel affairs of the Imperial Japanese Army & Navy, University of Tokyo Press, 1971 ISBN 978-4-13-036009-8
- The Maru Special series each volume, "Ushio Shobō". (Japan)
- Ships of the World series each volume, "Kaijinsha"., (Japan)
