= Japanese gunboat Futami =

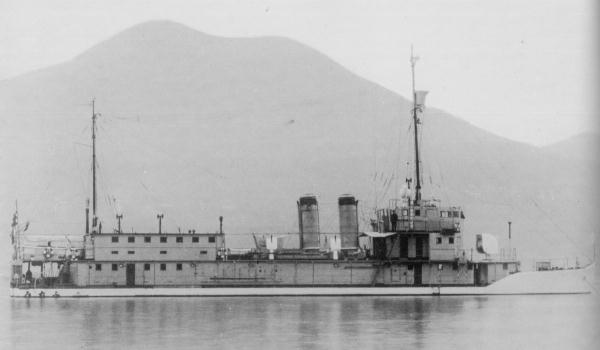
- Futami around 1933

History

Empire of Japan
- Name: Futami
- Ordered: 1927 Fiscal Year
- Builder: Fujinagata Shipyards, Japan
- Laid down: 25 June 1929
- Launched: 20 November 1929
- Completed: 28 February 1930
- Stricken: 30 September 1945

Republic of China
- Name: Yung An
- Acquired: 1946
- Fate: Captured by PRC in Chinese Civil War

China
- Name: Zhu Jiang
- Acquired: 30 November 1949
- Fate: Scrapped in 1960s

General characteristics
- Type: River gunboat
- Displacement: 203 long tons (206 t) (design); 249 long tons (253 t) (actual)
- Length: 46.3 m (151 ft 11 in)
- Beam: 6.79 m (22 ft 3 in)
- Draught: 1.13 m (3 ft 8 in)
- Propulsion: 2-shaft reciprocating VTE engines; 2 boilers; 1,300 hp (970 kW)
- Speed: 16 knots (30 km/h; 18 mph)
- Range: 1,000 nmi (1,900 km; 1,200 mi) at 10 knots (19 km/h; 12 mph)
- Complement: 54
- Armament: 1 × 80 mm (3.1 in)/45 cal. guns; 5 × 7.7 mm (0.30 in) machine guns

Futami (二見) was a river gunboat of the Imperial Japanese Navy, part of the 11th Gunboat Sentai, that operated on the Yangtze River in China during the 1930s, and during the Second Sino-Japanese War and World War II.

== Background ==
Futami was the second of two vessels in the Atami-class river gunboats built under the 1927 Fleet Building Program of the Imperial Japanese Navy for operations on the inland waterways of China.

== Design ==
The Atami-class river gunboats were an improved version of the previous Japanese gunboat Seta design. Futami had a hull with an overall length of 46.03 metres (151 ft 0 in) and beam of 6.79 metres (22 ft 3 in), with a normal displacement of 338 tons and draft of 1.13 metres (3 ft 8 in). She was propelled by two reciprocating engines with two Kampon boilers driving two shafts, producing 1,300 horsepower (970 kW) and had a top speed of 16 knots (30 km/h; 18 mph).

The ship was initially armed with one 80 mm (3.1 in)/28 caliber guns and five 7.7 mm (0.30 in) machine guns.

== Service record ==
Futami was laid down on 25 June 1929 and launched on 20 November 1929 at the Fujinagata Shipyards in Osaka, Japan. Although most Japanese river gunboats were incapable of open ocean sailing, and had to be broken down into sections and shipped for reassembly in Shanghai, Futami was successfully sailed to China in 1930. She was assigned to patrols of the Yangtze River from Shanghai to the Three Gorges, for commerce protection and as a show of force in protection of Japanese nationals and economic interests from 1 June 1931. On 14 June 1933, she ran aground on uncharted rocks in the Yangtze River and could not be refloated and repaired until August.

With the start of the Second Sino-Japanese War, Futami was based in Hankou, together with the minelayer Yaeyama, and gunboats Katata and Hozu and a detachment of 292 marines of the Special Naval Landing Force (SNLF) to protect Japanese residents in the interior of China.

From February to May 1939, Futami was part of the Japanese attempt to seize Battle of Nanchang under the command of the China Area Fleet's 1st China Expeditionary Fleet. She remained based out of Hankou throughout World War II and was removed from the navy list on 30 September 1945.

In 1946, she was ceded to the Republic of China as a prize of war, and commissioned into the Republic of China Navy as the Yung An (Chinese: 永安). After the Chinese Civil War and commissioned into the People's Liberation Army Navy on 30 November 1949 as the gunboat Zhu Jiang (Chinese: 珠江). She was finally scrapped in the 1960s.
