= Japanese gunboat Sumida =

Japanese gunboat Sumida may refer to:

- Japanese gunboat Sumida (1903), an Imperial Japanese Navy gunboat launched in 1903 and stricken in 1935
- Japanese gunboat Sumida (1939), an Imperial Japanese Navy gunboat launched in 1939 that was given to China after World War II and then served in the Republic of China Navy as Chang Hsi and later in the People's Republic of China's navy as Fu Jiang
