= Japanese gunboat Seta =

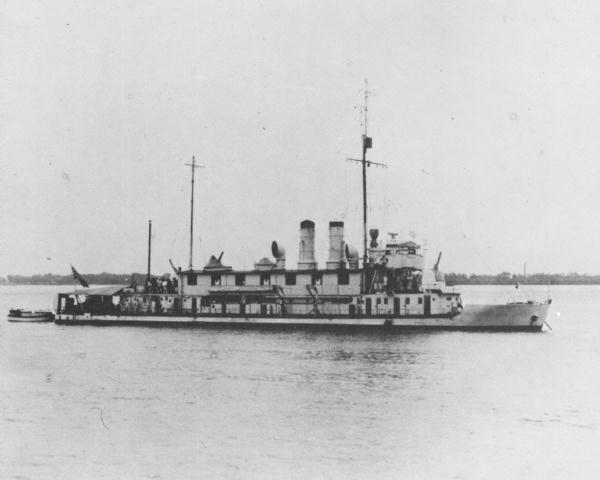
- Seta around 1935

History

Japan
- Name: Seta
- Ordered: 1920 Fiscal Year
- Builder: Harima Shipyards, Japan
- Laid down: 29 April 1922
- Launched: 30 June 1922
- Completed: 6 October 1923, disassembled & shipped to Tunghwa Shipbuilding, Shanghai. reassembly completed 1923 or 1924
- Stricken: 30 September 1945
- Fate: Bombed and sunk 26 November 1944

Taiwan
- Name: Chang Teh
- Acquired: 1946
- Fate: Captured in 1949 by PRC during Chinese Civil War

China
- Name: Min Jiang
- Acquired: 30 November 1949
- Fate: Scrapped in 1960s

General characteristics
- Type: Seta-class gunboat
- Displacement: 250 long tons (254 t) initial
- Length: 54.86 metres (180.0 ft)
- Beam: 8.23 metres (27.0 ft)
- Draught: 0.79 metres (2.6 ft).
- Propulsion: 3-shaft reciprocating VTE engines; 2 boilers; 1,400 hp (1,000 kW)
- Speed: 15 knots (17 mph; 28 km/h)
- Complement: 59
- Armament: 2 × 80 mm (3.1 in)/45 cal. guns; 6 × × 7.7 mm machine guns. 1940: rearmed with 2x 3.1"/45 Cal and 5x 13.2mm machine guns. 1943: Machine guns replaced with 6x Type 96 25mm autocannon

Seta (勢多) was a river gunboat of the Imperial Japanese Navy, part of the 11th Gunboat Sentai, that operated on the Yangtze River in China during the 1920s, and during the Second Sino-Japanese War and World War II.

== Background ==
Seta was the lead vessel of the Seta-class river gunboats built under the 1920 Fleet Building Program of the Imperial Japanese Navy for operations on the inland waterways of China.

== Design ==
The basic design of Seta was modeled after that of the gunboat Toba, with the same general dimensions and layout. Seta had a hull with an overall length of 56.08 metres (184.0 ft) and width of 8.23 metres (27.0 ft), with a normal displacement of 338 tons and draft of 1.02 metres (3.3 ft). She was propelled by two reciprocating engines with two Kampon boilers driving three shafts, producing 1,400 hp (1,000 kW) and had a top speed of 16 knots.

The ship was initially armed with two 80 mm (3.1 in)/28 cal. guns and six 7.7mm machine guns.

== Service record ==
Seta was laid down on 29 April 1922 and launched 30 June 1922 at the Harima Shipyards at Aioi, Hyogo, Japan. As the design was incapable of open ocean sailing, she was then broken down into sections and shipped to the Tunghwa Shipyard in Shanghai, where she was reassembled and completed on 20 October 1923. She was assigned to patrols of the Yangtze River from Shanghai to the Three Gorges, for commerce protection and as a show of force in protection of Japanese nationals and economic interests through the rest of the 1920s and early 1930s. From February 1932, she was assigned to the First China Expeditionary Fleet.

With the start of the Second Sino-Japanese War, Seta was based in Changsha, and was used to evacuate Japanese residents from the interior of China. During the Battle of Shanghai, Seta landed reinforcements of the Special Naval Landing Force (SNLF), and bombarded Chinese positions at Shanghai on 13 August 1937. She also helped assist in the evacuation of 20,000 of Shanghai's 30,000 Japanese civilian residents, and covered the landings of the Imperial Japanese Army’s 3rd Division, 8th Division and 11th Divisions north of Shanghai. On 26 June 1938, Seta, and with the gunboats Toba and Kotaka and minelayers Tsubame, Kamome, Natsushima and Nasami participated in the Battle of Madang and subsequent Battle of Jiujiang, bombarding Chinese positions and sweeping for mines in the Yangtze River. Many exposed crewmen are wounded or killed by Chinese light arms fire before the SNLF can capture the Madang Forts.

Around 1940, Seta was refitted with two 3.1-in/40 cal anti-aircraft guns and five 13.2 mm Hotchkiss machine guns. From 4 November 1941, she was based in Hankou, cooperating with Imperial Japanese Army units in mopping up operations. On 22 June 1942, she participated in “Operation SE” and was assigned to the Tung Ting Lake task force with gunboats Katata and Sumida. On 25 November, five crewmen were killed when Seta was strafed by fighters from the USAAF Fourteenth Air Force.

Around the end of 1943, her anti-aircraft weaponry was further upgraded with the replacement of the five Hotchkiss machine guns with six Type 96 AA guns.

On 6 June 1943, seven USAAF P-40 Warhawk fighters strafed Seta near Shanxi, killing 14 crewmen, including her captain, Commander Hisashi Matsumoto and wounding 14 more. She was repaired at the Jiangnan Shipyard in Shanghai by the end of July. She was reassigned back to Hankou for patrols of the upper Yangtze River, and was attacked again on 1 September 1943, 22 May 1944, and 11 June 1944 without taking any damage. However, an attack on 17 August wrecked her stern and rudder, and she had to be towed to Shanghai for repairs. Repairs were completed on 24 October; however two days later she was bombed again and sank. Her armaments were salvaged to help bolster the land-based defenses of Shanghai, and she was removed from the navy list on 30 September 1945.

The wreck was raised after the end of the war and after repairs was commissioned into the Republic of China Navy as the Chang Teh (Chinese: 長徳). She was then captured together with Toba by the People's Republic of China in the Chinese Civil War and commissioned into the People's Liberation Army Navy on 30 November 1949 as the gunboat Min Jiang (Chinese: 閩江). She was finally scrapped in the 1960s.
