= Atami-class gunboat =

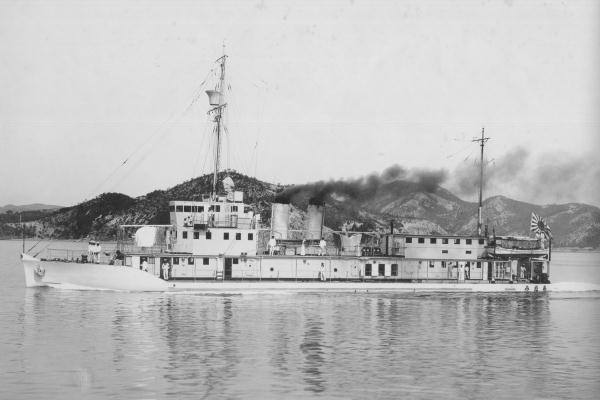
- Atami in 1929 in the Setouchi Sea

Class overview
- Name: Atami class
- Builders: Fujinagata, Osaka
- Operators: Imperial Japanese Navy; Republic of China Navy
- Preceded by: Seta class
- Succeeded by: Kotaka
- Built: 1928–1930
- In commission: 1929–1949
- Planned: 2
- Completed: 2
- Retired: 2

General characteristics
- Type: Riverine gunboat
- Displacement: 206 t (203 long tons) light; 225 t (221 long tons) standard
- Length: 45.29 m (148 ft 7 in) pp; 46.30 m (151 ft 11 in) oa
- Beam: 6.91 m (22 ft 8 in)
- Draught: 1.12 m (3 ft 8 in)
- Installed power: Triple expansion engine, 2 × Kampon boilers
- Propulsion: 2 × shafts, 970 kW (1,300 ihp)
- Speed: 16 3/4 knots (31.0 km/h; 19.3 mph)
- Complement: 77
- Armament: 1 × 7.9 cm/28 cal. gun; 1 × 13.2 mm (0.52 in) gun; 5 × 7.7 mm (0.30 in) machine guns

The Atami-class gunboats (熱海型砲艦, Atami-gata hōkan) were a class of riverine gunboats of the Imperial Japanese Navy. The class consisted of two vessels, Atami (熱海) and Futami (二見). Designed for service on Chinese rivers, they were an improved version of the Seta class. They were constructed by Fujinagata at Osaka, Japan in 1928 to 1930. The gunboats served in the Second Sino-Japanese War and World War II until their surrender in 1945. They were taken over by the Republic of China and renamed Yung Ping and Yung An respectively. Both ships were captured in 1949 by Communist China during the Chinese Civil War.

== Design and description ==
The Atami class were improved versions of the preceding Seta class. Designed for use on Chinese rivers, the gunboats measured 46.30 m (151 ft 11 in) long overall and 45.29 m (148 ft 7 in) between perpendiculars and at the waterline with a beam of 6.91 m (22 ft 8 in) and a draught of 1.12 m (3 ft 8 in). The vessels had a light displacement 206 t (203 long tons) and a standard displacement of 225 t (221 long tons). (Note: Sturton has the beam at 6.30 m (20 ft 8 in) and the draught at 0.91 m (3 ft 0 in).)

The gunboats were powered by a triple expansion engine fed steam by two Kampon boilers turning two shafts creating 970 kW (1,300 ihp). (Note: Jentschura, Jung and Mickel have the ships powered by a two-cylinder compound steam engine.) This gave the ships a maximum speed of 16 3/4 knots (31.0 km/h; 19.3 mph). They had capacity for 28 t (28 long tons; 31 short tons) of coal and 34 t (33 long tons; 37 short tons) of oil for fuel. The Atami class were initially armed with one 79 mm (3.1 in)/28 cal. anti-aircraft gun, one 13.2 mm (0.52 in) gun and five 7.7 mm (0.30 in) machine guns.

== Ships in class ==
Atami class construction data
Name	Builder	Launched	Completed	Fate
Atami (熱海)	Tama Fujinagata, Osaka	30 March 1929	30 June 1929	Surrendered 1945. Transferred to Republic of China. Renamed Yung Ping. Captured by Communist China in 1949.
Futami (二見)	Tama Fujinagata, Osaka	20 November 1929	28 February 1930	Surrendered 1945. Transferred to Republic of China. Renamed Yung An. Captured by Communist China in 1949.

== Construction and career ==
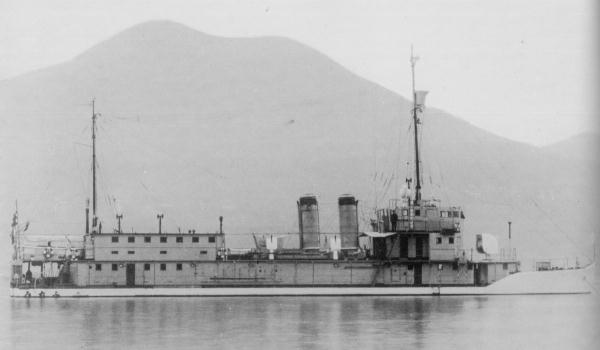
Futami in 1933

Two ships were authorised under the 1927 Programme. They were both constructed by Fujinagata at Osaka between 1928 and 1930. Both gunboats sailed from Japan to China for service on the Yangtze River. On 14 June 1933, Futami ran aground on an uncharted rock. The gunboat was refloated in August and sent to Shanghai for repairs. In 1937, at the onset of the Second Sino-Japanese War, both gunboats were assigned to the 11th Gunboat Division, with Atami acting as the force's flagship. The 11th Gunboat Division evacuated Japanese civilians from interior China to Shanghai in August. On 13 August, the division landed additional troops during the Second Battle of Shanghai and bombarded shore positions.

In 1940, the two gunboats were rearmed with five 25 mm (0.98 in) guns replacing the machine guns and one 79 mm/40 cal. anti-aircraft gun. On 10 June 1943, Atami was damaged by Chinese aircraft on the Yangtze River near Tung Ting Lake. By 1945, the two gunboats had been stripped of their guns, which were used ashore. Both ships were surrendered by the Japanese in August 1945. Transferred to the Republic of China, Atami was renamed Yung Ping and Futami renamed Yung An. Both ships were captured by Communist China in 1949 during the Chinese Civil War.
