= Masami Kobayashi =

Admiral in the Imperial Japanese Navy

- 小林 仁
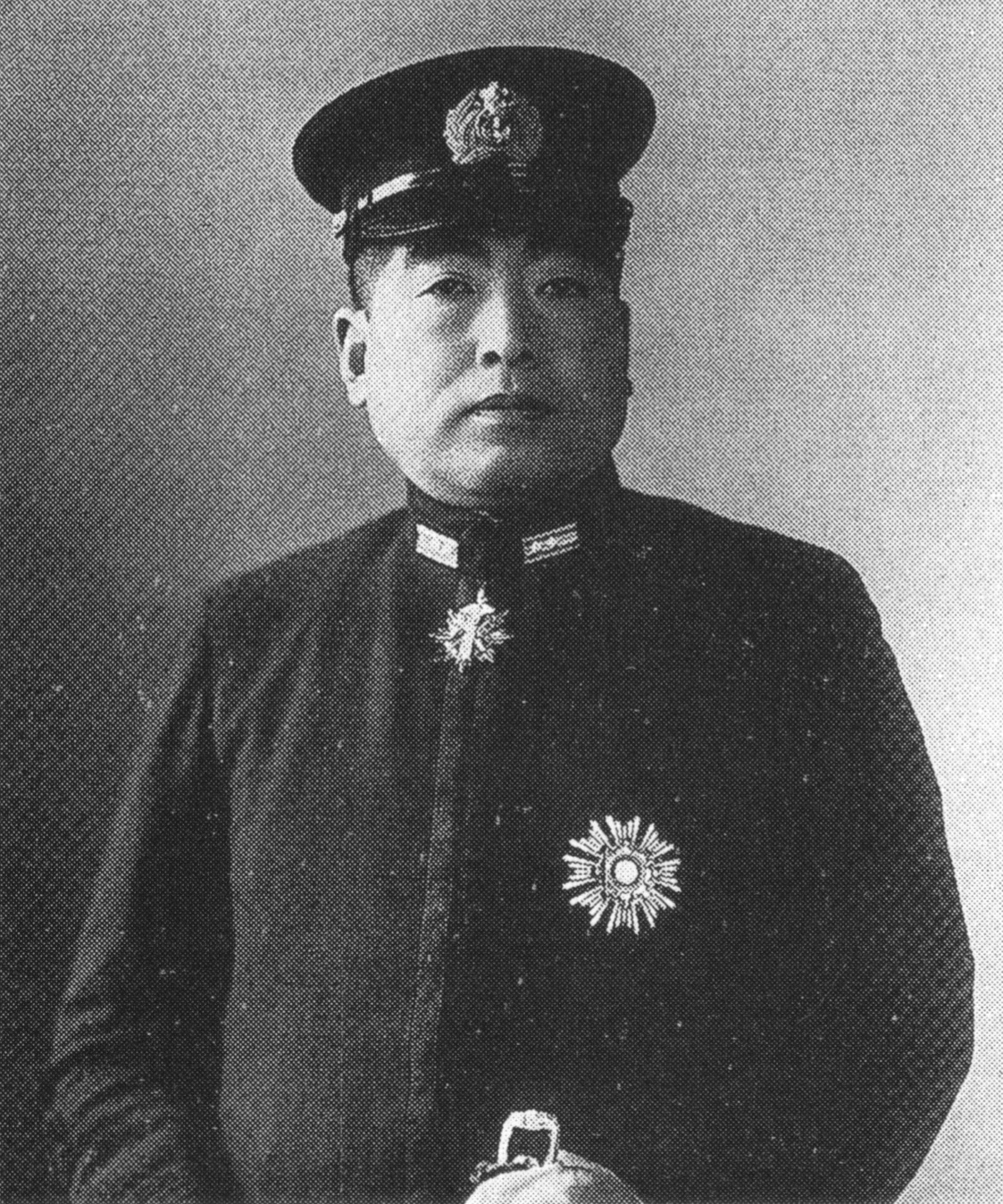
- Born: 18 June 1890; Yonezawa, Yamagata, Japan
- Died: 7 August 1977 (aged 87)
- Military career
- Allegiance: Empire of Japan
- Branch: Imperial Japanese Navy
- Service years: 1910–1944
- Rank: Vice Admiral
- Commands: Hira, Yamashiro, Kanko Area Base, Shanghai Area Auxiliary Base, Naval Hydrography Bureau, Osaka Guard District, 4th Fleet
- Conflicts: Second Sino-Japanese War; World War II; Pacific War

Masami Kobayashi (小林仁, Kobayashi Masami or Kobayashi Masashi; 18 June 1890 – 7 August 1977) was an admiral in the Imperial Japanese Navy during World War II. His name was sometimes misspelled as "Marasmi Kobayashi" or "Marashi Kobayashi" by contemporary United States Navy sources. He was an outspoken proponent of the Treaty Faction within the Imperial Japanese Navy.

== Biography ==
Kobayashi was a native of Yonezawa, Yamagata, where his father was a farmer. With the assistance of a clique of admirals within the Imperial Japanese Navy from former Yonezawa Domain (including Yamashita Gentarō and Chūichi Nagumo), he entered military preparatory schools and graduated 4th out of 149 cadets from the 38th class of the Imperial Japanese Navy Academy. His classmates included Michitaro Tozuka, Takeo Kurita, Rokuzō Sugiyama, Gunichi Mikawa and Aritomo Gotō. After serving on the cruiser Kasuga and battleship Asahi, Kobayashi was sent to the United Kingdom as part of the crew bringing the new battlecruiser Kongō to Japan. After attending the naval artillery and torpedo warfare schools, he served on the destroyer Kisaragi before attending the Naval Staff College in 1916, where he specialized in navigation.

On graduation and promotion to lieutenant, Kobayashi served as chief navigator on the survey vessel Katsuriki and the aging cruiser Akitsushima. He then returned to shore duty from 1919-1921 with the IJN 3rd Fleet and served as an instructor at the Navy Academy. He returned to the Naval War College in 1921 and was promoted to lieutenant commander on graduation in 1922. His first command was from 1923-1925 of the river gunboat Japanese gunboat Hira, which operated on the Yangtze River in Shanghai. From December 1925 to April 1928, Kobayashi served as a naval attaché to the United States. He was promoted to commander on 1 December 1927. After his return to Japan, Kobayashi served as executive officer on the submarine tender Chōgei. He was promoted to captain on December 1, 1931. A week later, he was sent to Geneva as an attendant to the Geneva Conference. In November 1932, he returned to the United States as a naval attaché, remaining until June 1934.

In December 1936, Kobayashi was appointed captain of the battleship Yamashiro. With the start of the Second Sino-Japanese War, Kobayashi became Chief of Staff of the IJN 4th Fleet and was based at Qingdao as an assistant to Rear Admiral Soemu Toyoda. On 1 December 1937, Kobayashi was promoted to rear admiral. From September 1938 to November 1939, he served as Chief of Staff of the Sasebo Naval District. He returned to the China front in November 1939 as Commander of the Naval Base Forces in Wuhan, and from November 1940 in Shanghai. He returned to Japan in May 1941. On 15 October 1941, Kobayashi was promoted to vice admiral.

=== World War II ===
Shortly before the attack on Pearl Harbor, Kobayashi was the commander of the Osaka Guard District. He remained in that position until March 1943 and despite having more combat experience than many of his colleagues, was assigned to personnel recruitment, munitions production, and general bureaucratic duties. It was not until after the tide of the war started to change that Kobayashi was permitted to return to combat status with his appointment to command the IJN 4th Fleet on 1 April 1943. The IJN 4th Fleet was responsible for the defense of the South Pacific, although its responsibilities overlapped, and often conflicted with the IJN 2nd Fleet, IJN 6th Fleet, and the Combined Fleet.

In November 1943, the Allies were victorious at the Battle of Tarawa and Battle of Makin in the Gilbert Islands, and in early February 1944 seized critically strategic positions in the Marshall Islands with the Battle of Kwajalein and the capture of Roi-Namur. Realizing that the major Japanese naval base in the South Pacific at Truk was endangered, Kobayashi ordered the naval assets there withdrawn to Palau, with Japanese surface warships being sent first, including carriers, battleships, and heavy cruisers. However, before the transfer could be complete, the United States launched Operation Hailstone, sinking a large number of Japanese ships, mostly smaller warships (light cruisers, destroyers, auxiliary cruisers) and merchant ships (which significantly crippled logistics and contributed to the isolation of Truk). The Imperial Japanese Navy General Staff blamed Kobayashi for the defeat and relieved him of his command two days later. On 30 May 1944, Kobayashi was forced from active service and on 31 May 1944, he went into the reserves.

After the surrender of Japan, Kobayashi was detained at Sugamo Prison in Tokyo by the SCAP authorities, and charged with command responsibility for the war crimes perpetrated by one of his subordinates, Rear Admiral Shigematsu Sakaibara in the "Wake Island Massacre". His case never came to trial, and he was released from Sugamo Prison in 1952.

In the post-war period, Kobayashi served as an advisor and instructor for the Japan Maritime Self-Defense Force.

== Notes ==
Military offices
Preceded by Samejima Tomoshige	Commander-in-chief of the 4th Fleet; 1 April 1943 - 19 February 1944	Succeeded by Hara Chūichi
