= Sensi =

Sensi may refer to:

== Media ==
- "Sensi", the eighth track on Long Beach Dub Allstars' 1999 album, Right Back
- "Sensi", a 2012 single by Anna Tatangelo
- Sensible Soccer (also Sensi), an association football video game series

== People ==
- Franco Sensi (1926–2008), Italian oil tycoon
- Giuseppe Sensi (1907–2001), Italian Cardinal of the Roman Catholic Church
- Rosella Sensi (born 1971), Italian entrepreneur and professional sports executive
- Stefano Sensi (born 1995), Italian professional footballer

== Other ==
- Sensi, a brand acquired by American multinational corporation, Emerson Electric
- Sensi, a restaurant in the Bellagio resort, luxury hotel, and casino
- Sensi, a ward in the former Kitutu Chache Constituency
- Sensi language, an extinct Panoan language
- Sinsemilla (also sensi), the female Cannabis plant that has not been fertilized
- Sensi, a perfume introduced in 2003 by Giorgio Armani

== See also ==
- Senshi (disambiguation)
- Sensis (disambiguation)
