= Japanese gunboat Fushimi =

Japanese gunboat Fushimi may refer to:

- Japanese gunboat Fushimi (1906), an Imperial Japanese Navy gunboat launched in 1906 and stricken in 1935
- Japanese gunboat Fushimi (1939), an Imperial Japanese Navy gunboat launched in 1939 that was given to China after World War II and then served in the Republic of China Navy as Chang Feng before being captured by the People's Republic of China during the Chinese Civil War
