= Japanese ship Kotaka =

Two Japanese warships have borne the name Kotaka:

- Japanese torpedo boat Kotaka, a torpedo boat launched in 1888 and stricken in 1927
- Japanese gunboat Kotaka, a gunboat launched in 1930 and sunk in 1944
