= Seta-class gunboat =

Type of boat in Japanese Navy

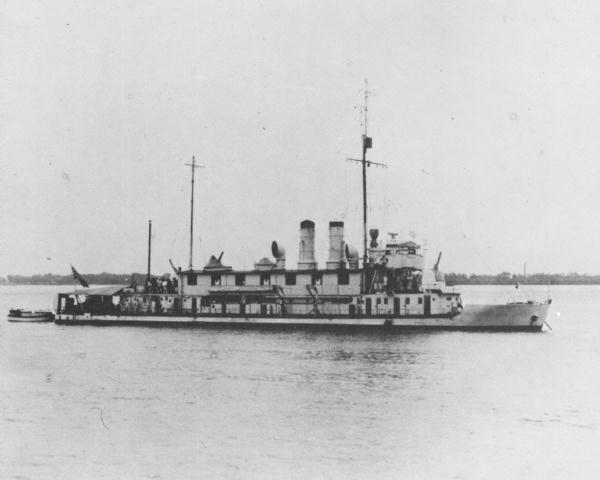
- Seta on the Yangtze River in 1935.

Class overview
- Name: Seta class
- Builders: Mitsubishi, Kobe; Harima Shipbuilding
- Operators: Imperial Japanese Navy; Republic of China Navy
- Preceded by: Toba
- Succeeded by: Atami class
- Built: 1922–1923
- In commission: 1923–1945
- Planned: 4
- Completed: 4
- Lost: 3
- Retired: 1

General characteristics
- Type: River gunboat
- Displacement: 338 t (333 long tons) standard; 400 t (390 long tons) full load
- Length: 56 m (184 ft) oa; 55 m (180 ft) pp
- Beam: 8.2 m (27 ft)
- Draft: 1.02 m (3 ft 4 in)
- Installed power: 1,600 kW (2,100 ihp), 2 cyl. compound steam engine
- Propulsion: 2 shafts
- Speed: 16 knots (30 km/h; 18 mph)
- Range: 1,750 nmi (3,240 km; 2,010 mi) at 10 knots (19 km/h; 12 mph)
- Complement: 62
- Armament: 2 × 7.6 cm/40 cal. guns; 3 × 13.2 mm (0.52 in) machine guns

The Seta-class gunboats (勢多型砲艦, Seta-gata hōkan) were a class of four riverine gunboats of the Imperial Japanese Navy. They entered service in 1923 for use along the Yangtze River in China. The remained in service through the Second Sino-Japanese War and World War II. Three of the gunboats were damaged beyond repair and broken up during World War II. The fourth, Seta, was surrendered at the end of the war, and taken over by the Republic of China Navy and renamed Chang Teh. During the Chinese Civil War, Chang Teh was captured by Communist Chinese forces.

== Design and description ==
The Seta class were a series of four river gunboats constructed along the same dimensions of the preceding Japanese gunboat Toba. They measured 56 m (184 ft) long overall and 55 m (180 ft) between perpendiculars with a beam of 8.2 m (27 ft) and a draft of 1.02 m (3 ft 4 in). They had a standard displacement of 338 t (333 long tons) and 400 t (390 long tons) at full load. (Note: Combinedfleet.com has the Seta class having a displacement of 374 t (368 long tons) and powered by a reciprocating vertical triple expansion engine creating 1,672 kW (2,242 ihp).)

The gunboats were powered steam from two Kampon boilers fed to a two-cylinder compound steam engine turning two shafts creating 1,600 kW (2,100 ihp). The Seta class had a maximum speed of 16 knots (30 km/h; 18 mph) and had capacity for 74 t (73 long tons; 82 short tons) of coal and 25 t (25 long tons; 28 short tons) of oil for fuel, giving them a range of 1,750 nautical miles (3,240 km; 2,010 mi) at 10 knots (19 km/h; 12 mph). The ships had a complement of 62. They were armed with two 7.6 cm/40 cal. guns and three or six 13.2 mm (0.52 in) machine guns.

== Ships in class ==
Seta class construction data
Name	Builder	Launched	Completed	Fate
Seta (勢多)	Harima Shipbuilding, Harima	30 June 1922	6 October 1923	Surrendered 1945. Transferred to Republic of China as Chang Teh. Captured in 1949 by the PRC
Katata (堅田)	Harima Shipbuilding, Harima	16 July 1922	20 October 1923	Broken up 1945
Hira (比良)	Mitsubishi, Kobe	14 March 1923	24 August 1923	Broken up 1945
Hozu (保津)	Mitsubishi, Kobe	19 April 1923	7 November 1923	Sunk 26 November 1944, wreck broken up early 1945

== Construction and career ==
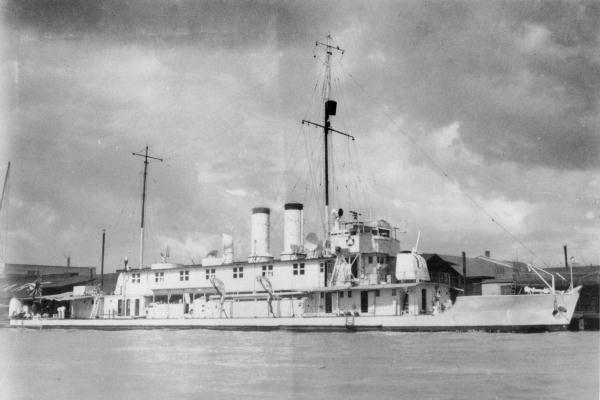
Hozu around 1935

The four gunboats were ordered as part of the 1920–28 Fleet Building Program for service on Chinese rivers. They were constructed in sections in Japan and reassembled in China. Seta and Katata were reassembled by the Tungwha Shipbuilding Company of Shanghai and Hira and Hozu by Yangtze Engineering Company in Hankou. During the Second Sino-Japanese War, the four gunboats were assigned to the 11th Gunboat Division in July 1937. Seta was based at Changsha, Hozu at Hankow, Hira at Chongqing and Katata at Shanghai. On 13 August 1937, the 11th Gunboat Division took part in the landing of additional Japanese troops during fighting in Shanghai. The 11th Gunboat Squadron took part in the assault on Xinguan on 13 December 1937, attacking fleeing Chinese troops as they sought to escape via boats and rafts.

During World War II, the Seta-class ships had their armament upgraded to two 7.6 cm/40 cal. guns and six 25 mm (0.98 in) anti-aircraft guns (AA guns). The 25 mm guns were later replaced with five 13.2 mm AA guns in Seta and Katata. However, by 1945, all of the guns aboard the gunboats were stripped for use ashore. Seta was attacked and damaged by Chinese aircraft while operating on the Yangtze River on 6 June 1943. Seta suffered damage but returned to service. On 12 December 1944, Katata was attacked by United States Army Air Forces (USAAF) aircraft at Jiujiang, damaged and driven aground. The ship was salvaged and towed to Shanghai where it was damaged again on 2 April 1945 by USAAF aircraft. The vessel was surrendered in August 1945 and broken up. Hira and Hozu were attacked by Chinese aircraft near Anqing on the Yangtze on 26 November 1944. Hira was badly damaged and considered a constructive total loss and broken up in early 1945, but only stricken from the naval vessel register on 10 May 1945. Hozu was sunk in shallow water and the wreck was broken up in early 1945. The ship was also only stricken from the naval vessel register on 10 May 1945. Seta, the only surviving member of the class, was surrendered in August 1945 and handed over to the Republic of China. Renamed Chang Teh, the ship was captured by the PRC in 1949 during the Chinese Civil War. The ship was renamed Min Jiang in 1949 and was reported broken up in the 1960s.
