= Battle of Mount Song =

1944 battle of the Second Sino-Japanese War

Battle of Mount Song/Ramou
- Part of the Second Sino-Japanese War and the China Burma India Theater of World War II
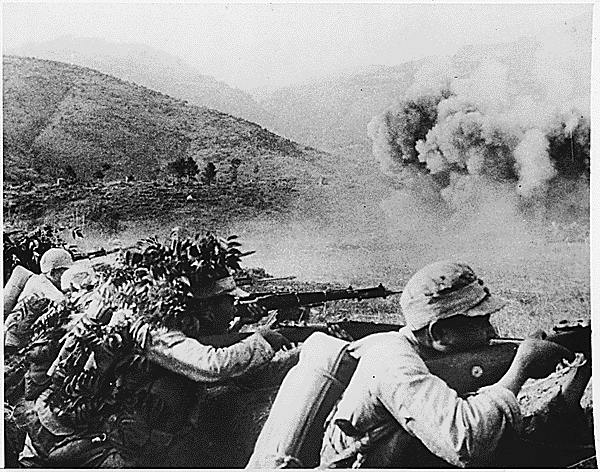
- Chinese Nationalist soldiers fighting near Salween River
| Date | June 4 – September 7, 1944 (3 months and 3 days) |
| Location | Mount Song (Chinese), Matsuyama/ Ramou (Japanese), Yunnan province, Republic of China |
| Result | Allied victory |

Belligerents
| China; United States | Japan |

Commanders and leaders
| (Republic of China (1912–1949)) Song Xilian (Republic of China (1912–1949)) Li Mi | Yūzō Matsuyama |

Strength
| 20,000 | Approximately 1,260 troops (including approximately 300 hospitalized) |

Casualties and losses
| 7,763 casualties including 4,000 killed | Japanese Claim : all but 3 of the 1,400-strong garrison killed |

The Battle of Mount Song (traditional Chinese: 松山戰役; simplified Chinese: 松山战役; pinyin: Sōng Shān Zhànyì), also known as the Battle of Ramou (拉孟の戦い), in 1944 was part of a larger campaign in southwest China during the Second World War. Chinese Nationalist forces aimed to retake the Burma Road.

== Background ==
The Japanese Army in Southern Yunnan was at risk of being cut off by advancing British and American troops in Northern Burma. The Japanese Army aimed to block the highway for as long as possible. Constructing a series of tunnels and bunkers over a static two-year period they turned the mountain and its immediate environs into a fortress. Songshan (in Chinese) Matsuyama (in Japanese) blocked the road immediately behind the Salween River. Although the Chinese Nationalist Army crossed the river with light casualties and surrounded the Japanese garrison, they found that their offensive capability was limited because of this garrison behind their line of advance.

The Chinese forces were unaware of the depth of the Japanese defences, and their underestimation led to heavy casualties through a slow and cautious campaign. Chinese artillery strikes and US bombing runs had little effect against Japanese forces underground. Japan also set up a series of hidden pillboxes to ambush the Chinese forces.

After three months of battle, the Chinese forces finally retook Mount Song through the use of extended bombardment and an overabundance of US aid and training, as well as several tons of U.S. TNT placed in tunnels beneath the fortifications. Once open the Burma Road could be used to supply China with aid via a land route.

American army magazine CBI Roundup said that 2,000 Japanese were kiled at Mount Song and that flamethrowers were used on the "rat-like holes" the Japanese were hiding in.

== Fall and aftermath ==
The Japanese listed only one survivor, Captain Kinoshita, an artillery officer and one other soldier ordered out to communicate to the Japanese high command the night before the fall of the outpost, with apparently one other soldier. Chinese sources say 7 soldiers were captured out of the total garrison, Japanese sources do not mention prisoners.

== Comfort Station ==
Upon the exhortations of Senior Staff Officer Masanobu Tsuji, a comfort station was established in early 1944. About 12 Japanese comfort women killed themselves towards the end of the siege after fighting alongside the Japanese garrison. Another five or six Korean comfort women were captured by Chinese and US forces and eventually repatriated.

Japanese historian Toyomi Asano said that the dead Japanese comfort women at Mount Song in fact did not fight, but were killed by Japanese soldiers or dragged into the front line against their will. Toyomi also revealed a Japanese pimp and a Japanese non-commissioned officer admitted Japanese soldiers used grenades to kill the some Japanese comfort women at Mount Song after other Japanese women were killed by artillery, none of them report fighting or voluntarily committing suicide. And some Japanese comfort women did survive the battle alive and surrendered to the Chinese, including a 35 year old Japanese woman who was photographed, the Japanese and Korean women admitted to falsely believing the Japanese military's lies that they would be tortured when captured, and that it shattered their trust in the Japanese military. Artillery fire killed 14 of the 24 women at Mount Song. The American military magazine CBI roundup reported that a 35 year old Japanese woman and 4 24-27 year old Korean women were captured alive by Chinese soldiers. 2 Japanese women and 8 Korean women were taken alive by the Chinese army, one of the Korean woman was pregnant and named Park Young-shim (d. 2006). Park was rescued by a Chinese farmboy when the Japanese soldiers were killing the Korean women. Korean women were also killed by Japanese soldiers with bullets at Mount Song to hide evidence. Japanese and Korean comfort women were also captured at Tengchong by the Chinese army. Japanese soldiers used bullets to kill 30 Korean women at Tengchong. Korean women were forced to drink mercuric chloride by Japanese soldiers at Tengchong.

Comfort women as rape victims denialist and Japanese nationalist historian Ikuhiko Hata admitted in Comfort Women and Sex in the Battle Zone the stories made up by Japanese soldiers about the Japanese comfort women committing suicide at Mount Song were false, and that Chinese captured both Japanese comfort women and Korean comfort women alive there. 4 Japanese women out of 25-26 comfort women in total along with 100 Japanese prisoners were seen in June 1945 in Kunming by a Japanese American soldier, and 4 or 5 Japanese comfort women out of 24 or 25 comfort women were seen by Japanese POW Yoshino Takakimi who surrendered in Tengchong and at the same Kunming prison 5 Korean comfort women and 4 Japanese comfort women were seen by Japanese POW Hayami Masanori who surrendered at Mount Song.

== Significance ==
After the capture of the stronghold, the Burma Road could be used once again to supply China.

A memorial park was built on top of the mountain by the Chinese government, with 402 sculptures representing soldiers from the Chinese Expeditionary Force spread over an area of 190000 sq. feet.
