= Sensis =

Sensis may refer to:

- Sensis (company), an Australian marketing services company
- Saab Sensis Corporation, a private company specializing in air traffic control and defense systems

== See also ==
- Sensi (disambiguation)
