= Japanese gunboat Katata =

Japanese river gunboat

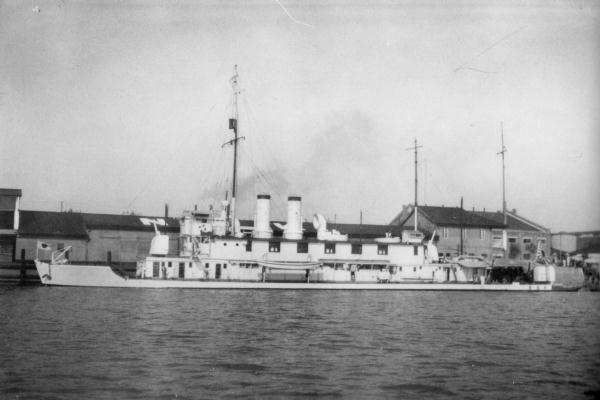
- Katata around 1935

History

Empire of Japan
- Name: Katata
- Ordered: 1910 Fiscal Year
- Builder: Harima Shipyards, Japan
- Laid down: 29 April 1922
- Launched: 16 July 1922, disassembled and shipped to Shanghai, China. Reassembly started 25 January 1923 Tunghwa Shipyard
- Completed: 20 October 1923.
- Stricken: 3 May 1947
- Fate: 1945 to China

General characteristics
- Type: Seta-class gunboat
- Displacement: 338 long tons (343 t) initial
- Length: 56.08 metres (184.0 ft)
- Beam: 8.23 metres (27.0 ft)
- Draught: 1.02 metres (3.3 ft).
- Propulsion: 2-shaft reciprocating VTE engines; 2 boilers; 2,100 hp (1,600 kW)
- Speed: 16 knots (18 mph; 30 km/h)
- Range: 1750 nautical miles @ 10 knots
- Complement: 62
- Armament: 2 × 80 mm (3.1 in)/45 cal. guns; 6 × 7.7 mm machine guns. 1940: rearmed with 2x 3.1"/45 Cal and 5x 13.2 mm (0.52 in) machine guns. 1943: Machine guns replaced with 6x Type 96 25mm autocannon

Katata (堅田, also Katada) was a river gunboat of the Imperial Japanese Navy, part of the 11th Gunboat Sentai, that operated on the Yangtze River in China during the 1920s, and during the Second Sino-Japanese War and World War II.

== Background ==
Katata was the second of the Seta-class river gunboats built under the 1920 Fleet Building Program of the Imperial Japanese Navy for operations on the inland waterways of China.

== Design ==
The basic design of Katata was modeled after that of the gunboat Toba, with the same general dimensions and layout. Katata had a hull with an overall length of 56.08 metres (184.0 ft) and width of 8.23 metres (27.0 ft), with a normal displacement of 338 tons and draft of 1.02 metres (3.3 ft). She was propelled by two reciprocating engines with two Kampon boilers driving three shafts, producing 1,400 hp (1,000 kW) and had a top speed of 16 knots.

The ship was initially armed with two 80 mm (3.1 in)/28 cal. guns and six 7.7mm machine guns.

== Service record ==
Katata was laid down on 29 April 1922 and launched 16 July 1922 at the Harima Shipyards at Aioi, Hyogo, Japan. As the design was incapable of open ocean sailing, she was then broken down into sections and shipped to the Tunghwa Shipyard in Shanghai, where she was reassembled and completed on 20 October 1923. She was assigned to patrols of the Yangtze River from Shanghai to the Three Gorges, for commerce protection and as a show of force in protection of Japanese nationals and economic interests through the rest of the 1920s and early 1930s. Katata was commanded by Lieutenant Commander Masatomi Kimura from January to September 1932.

With the start of the Second Sino-Japanese War, Katata was based in Shanghai, and was used to evacuate Japanese residents from the interior of China. During the Battle of Shanghai, Katata bombarded Chinese positions at Shanghai on 13 August 1937. She also helped assist in the evacuation of 20,000 of Shanghai’s 30,000 Japanese civilian residents, and covered the landings of the Imperial Japanese Army’s 3rd Division, 8th Division and 11th Divisions north of Shanghai.

Around 1940, Katata was refitted with two 3.1-in/40 cal anti-aircraft guns and five 13.2 mm Hotchkiss machine guns. She was assigned to the First China Expeditionary Fleet in December 1941. On 22 June 1942, she participated in “Operation SE” and was assigned to the Tung Ting Lake task force with gunboats Seta and Sumida. Around the end of 1943, her anti-aircraft weaponry was further upgraded with the replacement of the five Hotchkiss machine guns with six Type 96 AA guns.

On 12 December 1944 USAAF aircraft bombed and damaged Katata near Jiujiang, Jiangxi Province at 29°35′N 116°10′E (she was possibly sunk and salvaged). She was towed to Shanghai and stripped of her armament in early 1945 to help bolster the land-based defenses. The hulk was bombed by USAAF P-51 Mustang fighters on 2 April 1945 and remained wrecked to the surrender of Japan.

The wreck was given to the Republic of China as war reparations in 1946 and scrapped some time later. She was officially removed from the navy list on 3 May 1947.
