= Song Xilian =

Chinese general (1907–1993)

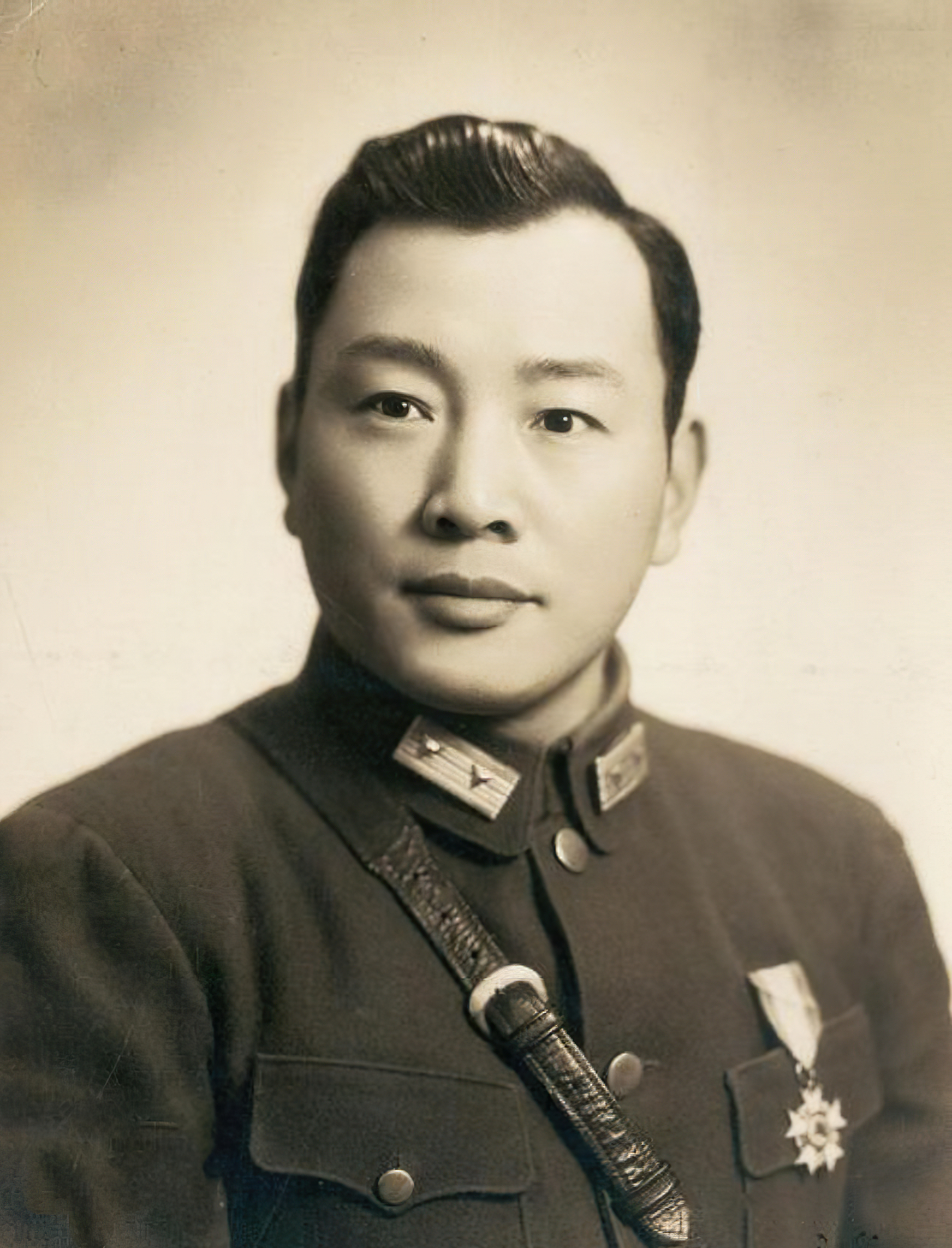
- Song Xilian
- Native name: 宋希濂
- Born: April 9, 1907; Xiangxiang, Hunan, Qing China
- Died: February 14, 1993 (aged 85) New York City, United States
- Allegiance: Republic of China
- Branch: (Republic of China (1912–1949)) National Revolutionary Army
- Service years: 1923–1949
- Rank: Lieutenant General
- Conflicts: Northern Expedition; Second Sino-Japanese War; Battle of Shanghai; Battle of Nanking; Battle of Northern and Eastern Henan; Battle of Lanfeng; Battle of Wuhan; South-East Asian theatre of World War II; Burma campaign; Battle of Northern Burma and Western Yunnan; Battle of Mount Song; Chinese Civil War; Ili Rebellion; Battle of Baitag Bogd; Huaihai campaign

Song Xilian (Chinese: 宋希濂, courtesy name Yinguo (蔭國), April 9, 1907 – February 13, 1993) was a general of the Republic of China during the Second Sino-Japanese War and the Chinese Civil War. He was a commander of the Chinese Expeditionary Force during the war with Japan. He was captured during the Chinese Civil War and imprisoned until 1959, later serving in various positions in the Chinese government.

== Early career ==
In 1920, Song Xilian enrolled in Changjun High School in Changsha, Hunan. In January 1924 he and Chen Geng traveled to Guangzhou where they enlisted in the Kuomintang's Whampoa Military Academy's first class. Song would be the class's youngest graduate. He joined the Kuomintang in June of that year, and in 1925 he would take part in the National Revolutionary Army's first Eastern Punitive Expedition. Song was also a member of the Chinese Communist Party, but withdrew from the party after the Canton Coup in 1926. He was promoted to battalion commander and served during the first phase of the Northern Expedition.

In 1927 he left for Chiba, Japan to study at the local military academy. Following the breakout of the Central Plains War in 1930 Song returned to China, becoming a staff officer in the National Revolutionary Army's 1st division. He held the rank of lieutenant colonel. In 1931 the division was reorganized into the 87th Division, with Song given command of the 261st Brigade. He fought against the Japanese army at Shanghai during the January 28 Incident. Song was promoted to lieutenant general in 1936.

== Second Sino-Japanese War ==
After the outbreak of the Second Sino-Japanese War, Song served as the commander of the 78th Army and the commander of the 36th Division, serving at the Battle of Shanghai and Battle of Nanking. In 1938, he was transferred to the 88th Division of the 71st Army, participating in the Battle of Lanfeng and the Battle of Wuhan, and later also serving as the deputy commander-in-chief of the 34th Army Group. He then served as the commander-in-chief of the 11th Army Group and was tasked with defending Kunming, Yunnan. After the Japanese invaded British Burma in late 1941, Song was deployed with the Chinese Expeditionary Force to defend the Yunnan-Burma border, a position he held until the end of the war.

== Chinese Civil War ==
After the end of the war with Japan, Song served in Xinjiang, fighting the Mongolians during the Beitashan incident and suppressing the Ili Rebellion. Song was then sent to participate in the Huaihai campaign in 1948, but his troops suffered heavy losses and he was given a position down south. In 1949, Song was captured by the Communists in Sichuan and imprisoned in Gongdelin Prison in Beijing.

== Later life ==
After a decade in prison, Song was amnestied in 1959 and served as the commissioner of Cultural and Historical Information in the Chinese People's Political Consultative Conference. He served as the vice president of the Huangpu Military Academy Alumni Association, and also advocated for the unification of Taiwan and Mainland China. He later left for the United States and settled in New York City. He died there in 1993, with his ashes being buried in Changsha, Hunan.
