= Senshi =

Senshi may refer to:

- Senshi (wrestler), American professional wrestler Brandon Silvestry (born 1979)
- Senshi-Con, an American anime convention
- A fictional skilled gunfighter in the manga series Grenadier

== See also ==
- "Dennō Senshi Porygon", an episode of the anime television series Pokémon
- Sailor Senshi, a fictional team of magical girls in the manga series Sailor Moon
- Senshi Sōsho, a Japanese official military history book series
- Sentai, a Japanese military unit
