= Japanese gunboat Atami =

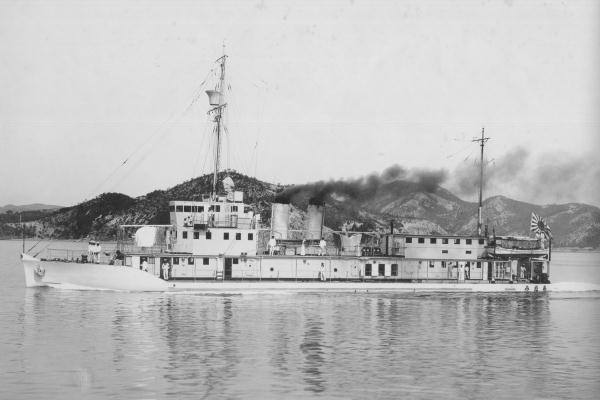
- Atami in 1929

History

Empire of Japan
- Name: Atami
- Ordered: 1927 Fiscal Year
- Builder: Fujinagata Shipyards, Japan
- Laid down: 6 November 1928
- Launched: 30 March 1929
- Completed: 30 June 1929
- Decommissioned: 30 September 1945
- Stricken: 30 September 1945

Republic of China
- Name: Yong Ping
- Acquired: 30 September 1945
- Fate: captured by PRC in Chinese Civil War

China
- Name: Wu Jiang
- Acquired: 30 November 1949
- Fate: Scrapped in 1960s

General characteristics
- Class & type: Atami-class gunboat
- Displacement: 249 tons
- Length: 150 ft 7 in (45.90 m) overall
- Beam: 17.4 ft 10 in (5.56 m)
- Draught: 3.7 ft (1.1 m)
- Propulsion: Geared turbines; 2 × shafts; 2 × boilers; 1,300 hp (970 kW)
- Speed: 16 knots (30 km/h; 18 mph)
- Range: 1,000 nmi (1,900 km; 1,200 mi) at 10 knots (19 km/h; 12 mph)
- Complement: 54
- Armament: 1 × 8 cm/40 3rd Year Type naval gun; 5 × Lewis guns; 1 × Hotchkiss M1929 machine gun AA (installed in 1941)

Atami (熱海) was a river gunboat of the Imperial Japanese Navy, part of the 11th Gunboat Sentai, that operated on the Yangtze River in China during the 1930s, and during the Second Sino-Japanese War. After World War II, the ship entered service with the Republic of China Navy as Yong Ping (永平), but was captured by the Chinese communists at the end of Chinese Civil War, and entered People's Liberation Army Navy as Wu Jiang (乌江). The ship was finally scrapped in the 1960s.

== Sources ==
- Japanese gunboats (with photos) (in Japanese)
- Vessels of the IJN
- Monograph 144 Chapter II
