= Kaneko Shigeji =

Japanese boxer (1931–2016)

Shigeji Kaneko
Personal information
- Nationality: Japanese
- Born: 13 August 1931 Tsubame, Niigata, Japan
- Died: 2 January 2016 (aged 84) Tokyo, Japan
- Weight: Featherweight, super featherweight

Boxing career

Boxing record
- Total fights: 65
- Wins: 54
- Win by KO: 33
- Losses: 10
- Draws: 1

Shigeji Kaneko (Japanese: 金子繁治, Kaneko Shigeji, 13 August 1931 – 2 January 2016) was a Japanese featherweight boxer during the 1950s. He fought Gabriel "Flash" Elorde four times, winning them all. He was also a boxing promoter from the 1980s until the early 2000s.

Shigeji died from pneumonia on 2 January 2016 in Tokyo. He was 84.
