= Japanese gunboat Sumida (1939) =

River gunboat of the Imperial Japanese Navy

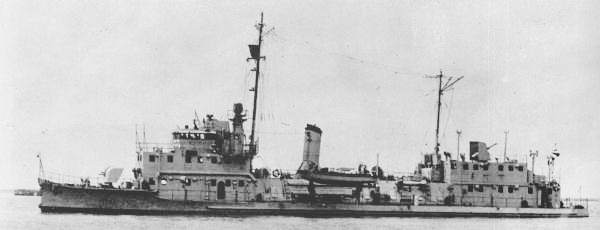
- Sumida at Osaka, May 1940

History

Japan
- Name: Sumida
- Ordered: 1927 Fiscal Year
- Builder: Fujinagata Shipyards
- Laid down: 13 April 1939
- Launched: 30 October 1939
- Completed: 31 May 1940
- Stricken: 3 May 1947

Republic of China
- Name: Chang Hsi
- Acquired: 1945
- Fate: Captured by PRC in Chinese Civil War

People's Republic of China
- Name: Fu Jiang
- Acquired: 30 November 1949
- Fate: Scrapped in 1960s

General characteristics
- Type: River gunboat
- Displacement: 304 long tons (309 t) (design); 350 long tons (356 t) (actual)
- Length: 50.3 metres (165 ft)
- Beam: 9.8 metres (32 ft)
- Draught: 1.2 metres (3.9 ft).
- Propulsion: 2-shaft Kampon turbine engines; 2 boilers; 2,200 hp (1,600 kW)
- Speed: 17 knots (20 mph; 31 km/h)
- Range: 1400 nautical miles @ 14 knots
- Complement: 61
- Armament: 1 × 80 mm (3.1 in)/45 cal. guns; 1 × × Type 96 25 mm (0.98 in) machine guns

Sumida (隅田) was a river gunboat of the Imperial Japanese Navy, that operated on the Yangtze River in China during the 1940s, and during the Second Sino-Japanese War and World War II.

== Background ==
Sumida was the second of two vessels in the Fushimi-class river gunboats authorized under the 3rd Naval Armaments Supplement Programme of 1937.

== Design ==
Sumida had a hull with an overall length of 50.3 metres (165 ft) and width of 9.80 metres (32.2 ft), with a normal displacement of 338 tons and draft of 1.2 metres (3.9 ft). She was propelled by two Kampon steam turbine engines with two boilers driving two shafts, producing 2,200 hp (1,600 kW) and had a top speed of 17 knots.

The ship was armed with one 80 mm (3.1 in)/28 cal. gun and one 25mm machine gun.

== Service record ==
Sumida was laid down on 13 April 1939 and launched 30 October 1939 at the Fujinagata Shipyards in Osaka, Japan. On commissioning on 31 May 1940, she was assigned to the Yokosuka Naval District and attached to the 1st China Expeditionary Fleet, arriving in Shanghai on 17 June. From July to November, she was assigned to patrols of the lower Yangtze River, and from November to April 1942, to patrols of the middle Yangtze as far as Hankou. After April 1942, she was assigned to patrols of the upper Yangtze.

On 22 June Sumida was attached to the Tung Ting Lake force, along with Katada and Seta was part of “Operation SE”. She was damaged the same day in an air raid, which killed her captain and 11 crewmen. After repairs at Shanghai, she was again assigned to patrols of the lower Yangtze from 19 August 1942, and the middle Yangtze from 1 September 1943. On 22 June 1944, a flight of twenty USAAF B-24 Liberators attached to the Fourteenth Air Force bombed the docks at Hankou, damaging Sumida and killing eight crewmen. She was again damaged in another air raid on 25 November.

After the surrender of Japan, Sumida was given to the Republic of China as a prize of war, and commissioned into the Republic of China Navy as the Chiang Hsi (Chinese: 江犀). She was removed from the Japanese navy list on 3 May 1947. Captured during the Chinese Civil War by the People’s Republic of China, she was commissioned into the People's Liberation Army Navy on 30 November 1949 as the gunboat Fu Jiang (Chinese: 涪江). She was finally scrapped in the 1960s.
