= Japanese gunboat Hozu =

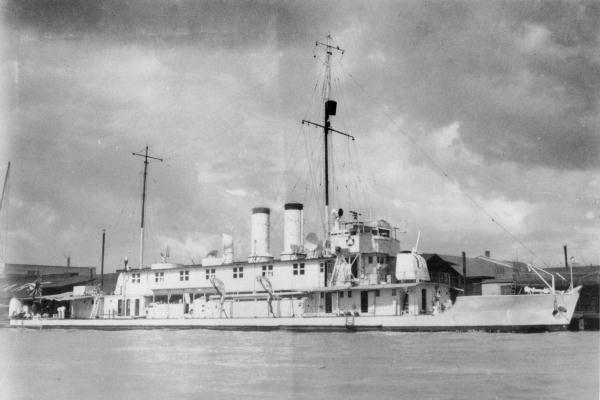
- Hozu around 1935

History

Japan
- Name: Hozu
- Builder: Mitsubishi Zosensho, Kobe, Japan
- Laid down: 15 August 1921
- Launched: 9 April 1923
- Completed: 1923, disassembled & shipped to China 11 November 1923. Reassembly completed 1 December 1923.
- Stricken: 10 May 1945
- Fate: Sunk 5 December 1944 by air attack

General characteristics
- Type: Seta-class gunboat
- Armament: 2 × 8 cm (3.1 in)/40 3rd Year Type guns; 3 or 6 × 13.2 mm (0.52 in) Hotchkiss M1929 machine guns

Hozu (保津) was a river gunboat of the Imperial Japanese Navy, part of the 11th Gunboat Sentai, that operated on the Yangtze River in China during the 1930s, and during the Second Sino-Japanese War.

On August 13, 1937 Hozu and other IJN ships bombarded Chinese positions at Shanghai. On December 13 Hozu and other ships engaged Chinese positions at Xiaguan and attacked Chinese boats and rafts on the Yangtze River. On December 5, 1944 Hozu and the gunboat Hira ran aground near Anking. They were subsequently bombed by Chinese aircraft, Hira was damaged and Hozu was sunk. The wreck was scrapped 1945.

== Sources ==
- Japanese gunboats (with photos) (in Japanese)
- Vessels of the IJN
- Monograph 144 Chapter II
