= Japanese gunboat Hira =

Imperial Japanese Navy gunboat, 1923–1945

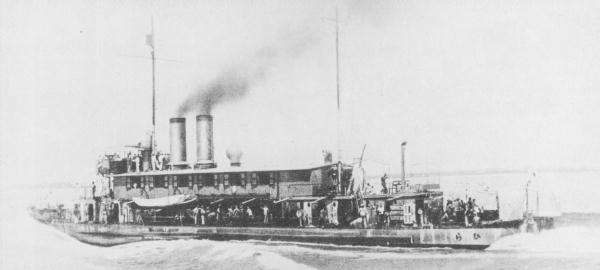
- Hira 1923

History

Empire of Japan
- Name: Hira
- Builder: Mitsubishi Zosensho, Kobe, Japan
- Laid down: 15 August 1921
- Launched: 14 March 1923
- Completed: 24 August 1923, disassembled and shipped to Yangtze Engineering, Hankow, China. Reassembly finished 1 December 1923
- Stricken: 10 May 1945
- Fate: Scrapped 1945

General characteristics
- Type: Seta-class gunboat
- Armament: 2 × 80 mm (3 in)/40 cal. guns; 3 or 6 × 13.2 mm (0.52 in) machine guns

Hira (比良) was a river gunboat of the Imperial Japanese Navy, part of the 11th Gunboat Sentai, that operated on the Yangtze River in China during the 1930s, and during the Second Sino-Japanese War.

On 13 December 1937, Hira and other IJN ships engaged Chinese positions at Xiaguan, China and attacked Chinese boats and rafts on the Yangtze River. On 17 August 1944 Hira was damaged by US 14th Air Force aircraft at Kiukiang, China. On 26 November 1944 Hira and the gunboat Hozu ran aground near Anking, China. Chinese aircraft subsequently bombed and sunk Hozu and severely damaged Hira. Hira was scrapped in July 1945.

== Sources ==
- Japanese gunboats (with photos) (in Japanese)
- Vessels of the IJN
- Monograph 144 Chapter II
