= Rokuzō Sugiyama =

Imperial Japanese Navy vice admiral (1890–1947)

- 杉山 六蔵
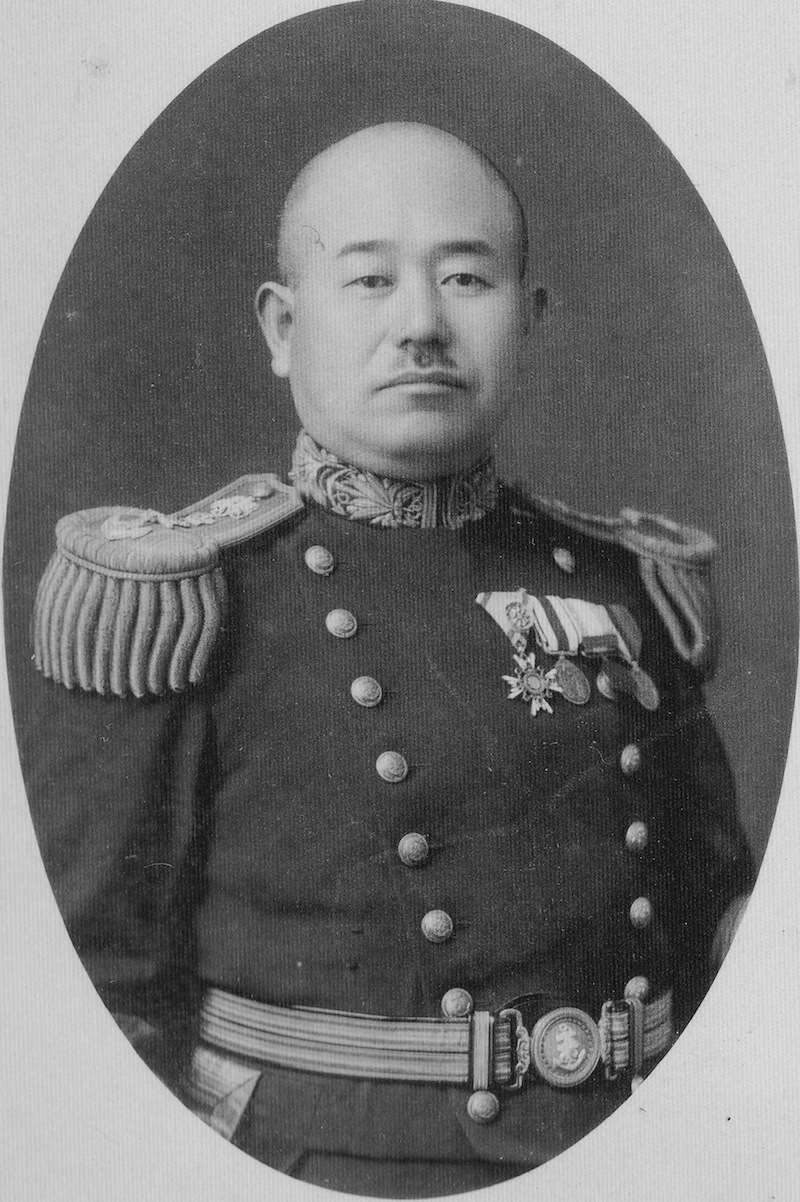
- Born: January 4, 1890; Tokyo, Japan
- Died: June 6, 1947 (aged 57); Tokyo, Japan
- Education: Imperial Japanese Naval Academy; Gunnery and Torpedo School; Naval Staff College
- Military career
- Allegiance: Empire of Japan
- Branch: Imperial Japanese Navy
- Service years: 1910–1945
- Rank: Vice admiral
- Units: Kasagi, Tone, Hizen, Yunagi, Amatsukaze, Imperial Japanese Navy General Staff, Naval Staff College
- Commands: Yugure, Harukaze, Sanae, Yura, Aoba, Yakumo, Hyūga, IJN 3rd Fleet, IJN 3rd Expeditionary Fleet, Naval Shipbuilding Command, Sasebo Naval District
- Conflicts: World War I; Second Sino-Japanese War; World War II
- Other work: Foreign naval observer, delegate

Rokuzō Sugiyama (杉山 六蔵, Sugiyama Rokuzō; January 4, 1890 – June 6, 1947) was a vice admiral in the Imperial Japanese Navy during World War II.

== Biography ==
Sugiyama was born in Tokyo as the son of a bureaucrat in the Ministry of Agriculture and Commerce. He graduated from the 38th class of the Imperial Japanese Naval Academy in July 1910, ranking second in his class of 147 cadets. As a midshipman, he served on the cruisers Kasagi and Tone, and as a sub-lieutenant on the battleship Hizen. After graduation from Gunnery and Torpedo School in early 1914, he was assigned to the destroyers Yunagi and Amatsukaze during World War I. From June 1918, he served as a foreign naval observer in the Netherlands, and was member of the Japanese delegation at the Versailles Treaty negotiations in 1920.

After his return to Japan in early 1921, Sugiyama received his first command, that of the destroyer Yugure in November 1921, followed by Harukaze in November 1922. After graduation from the Naval Staff College in December 1922, he was promoted to lieutenant commander, and was captain of the destroyer Sanae in 1924. Sugiyama was promoted to commander in December 1926, and captain in December 1930, serving in various staff positions within the Imperial Japanese Navy General Staff, and as an instructor at the Naval Staff College from 1930 to 1933. He returned to sea as captain of the cruiser Yura in June 1933, followed by the Aoba in November 1933, Yakumo in February 1934, and battleship Hyūga in September 1935.

From November 1936, Sugiyama was appointed Chief of Staff of the IJN 3rd Fleet, and was thus in a senior command position of Japanese naval forces in China during the early stages of the Second Sino-Japanese War. He was appointed to make a formal apology to the United States over the USS Panay incident in 1937. Sugiyama rose to vice admiral on November 15, 1940. On July 5, 1941, Sugiyama was appointed Commander-in-chief of the IJN 3rd Fleet.

Following the start of the Pacific War, on January 3, 1942, Sugiyama accepted the post of commander in chief of the IJN 3rd Expeditionary Fleet. However, in December 1942, he returned to a shore position with the Naval Shipbuilding Command, of which he became Commandant from April 15, 1943, to November 4, 1944. He was subsequently commander of the Sasebo Naval District until the end of the war.

Sugiyama died on June 6, 1947, aged 57.
