= Japanese gunboat Fushimi (1906) =

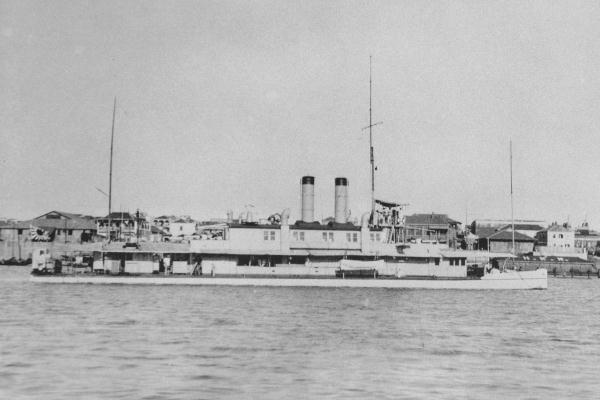
- Japanese gunboat Fushimi in 1912

History

Japan
- Name: Fushimi
- Ordered: 1903 Fiscal Year
- Builder: Yarrow Shipbuilders
- Laid down: March 22, 1903
- Launched: August 8, 1906
- Commissioned: October 1, 1906
- Stricken: March 1, 1935
- Fate: Scrapped March 1935

General characteristics
- Type: River gunboat
- Displacement: 180 long tons (180 t)
- Length: 48.77 m (160.0 ft)
- Beam: 7.47 m (24 ft 6 in)
- Draught: 0.69 m (2 ft 3 in)
- Propulsion: reciprocating steam engine; 2 shaft, 2 boilers; 900 shp
- Speed: 14 knots (16 mph; 26 km/h)
- Range: 25 tons coal
- Complement: 45
- Armament: 2 × 60 mm (2.4 in)/40 cal. Hotchkiss guns; 4 × machine guns

Fushimi (伏見) was a river gunboat in the Imperial Japanese Navy, serving in China during the inter-war period.

== History ==
Fushimi was the second gunboat in the Imperial Japanese Navy inventory designed specifically for inland river service. The need for such a vessel to operate on the rivers of the Asian mainland to protect Japanese commercial interests at various treaty ports had been perceived even before the Boxer Rebellion. The Japanese government turned to the United Kingdom, and placed an order for two such vessels in 1903: one the Sumida to John I. Thornycroft & Company and the other the (Fushimi) to Yarrow Shipbuilders in Scotland. Fushimi was slightly larger than Sumida, and easily distinguishable by having two smokestacks compared to Sumida's single stack.

Fushimi was laid down on March 22, 1903 and was to be shipped to Shanghai for final fitting out by Kawasaki. However, due to official British neutrality in the Russo-Japanese War, the unfinished ship was impounded in Hong Kong until the end of that conflict. It was finally launched at Shanghai on August 8, 1906 and commissioned into the Imperial Japanese Navy as a second-class gunboat on October 1, 1906.

Fushimi remained based at the International Settlement in Shanghai. Due to its more powerful engine, it was capable of navigating the Three Gorges of the upper Yangtze River and was the first Japanese warship to call on Chongqing in April, 1907.

During World War I, due to the official neutrality of the Republic of China, Fushimi's weaponry was placed under lock in 1914, and was not freed until China officially joined the Allies.

Fushimi saw combat service in the very early stages of the Second Sino-Japanese War, beginning with the First Shanghai Incident in 1931. Fushimi continued to operate on the Yangtze River in China during the early 1930s, but was already considered obsolete, and was struck from the navy list on March 1, 1935. It was scrapped on March 31, 1935 at Shanghai.
