= Japanese gunboat Kotaka =

Imperial Japanese gunboat (sunk 1944)

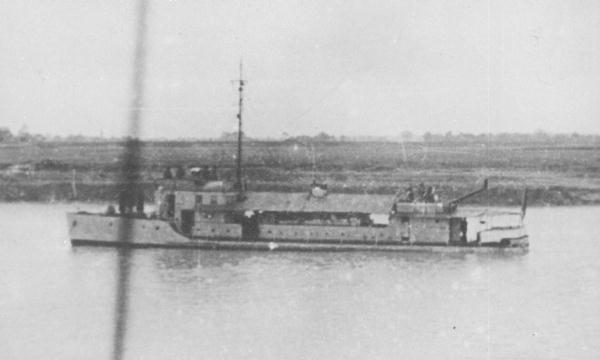

History

Empire of Japan
- Name: Kotaka
- Namesake: general term of small accipitridae (example: Eurasian sparrowhawk)
- Ordered: fiscal year 1929
- Builder: Mitsui Engineering & Shipbuilding, Tama shipyard
- Cost: 246,561 JPY
- Laid down: 2 September 1929
- Launched: 4 December 1929
- Completed: 11 January 1930
- Stricken: 1944
- Home port: Shanghai
- Fate: Sunk by air raid on 31 May 1944

General characteristics
- Type: River gunboat
- Displacement: 50 tons standard; 60.668 long tons (62 t) normal condition
- Length: 30.500 m (100 ft 0.8 in) oa; 30.000 m (98 ft 5.1 in) lpp
- Beam: 4.900 m (16 ft 0.9 in) max
- Draught: 0.640 m (2 ft 1.2 in)
- Depth: 1.400 m (4 ft 7.1 in)
- Propulsion: 2 × Niigata Iron Works diesels, 540 bhp
- Speed: 15.5 knots (28.7 km/h; 17.8 mph)
- Range: 1,000 nmi (1,900 km; 1,200 mi) at 10 kn (19 km/h; 12 mph)
- Armament: 3 × Type 92 7.7 mm machine guns 1942: Reduced to 2 × Type 92 7.7 mm machine guns

Kotaka (小鷹) was a river gunboat of the Imperial Japanese Navy, part of the 11th Gunboat Sentai, that operated on the Yangtze River in China during the 1930s, and during the Second Sino-Japanese War. During World War II, the vessel was in use as a passenger ship and communications ship. The vessel was sunk on May 31, 1944.

== Construction and career ==
The gunboat participated in the Battle of Wuhan from June to September 1938 and in Battle of Madang and the Battle of Jiujiang in June 1938. From February to May 1939, Kotaka fought in the Nanchang Campaign. In 1942 Kotaka was in service as a passenger ship. The vessel was sunk on May 31, 1944, on the Yangtze River while serving as a communications ship. The IJN official designation was 60-ton traffic ship (Motored river exclusive-Special type) (六拾瓲交通船 (内火式河用特型),, 60-ton kōtsūsen (Uchibishiki kawayou-Tokugata)).

== Bibliography ==
- The Maru Special, Japanese Naval Vessels No.53, Japanese support vessels, "Ushio Shobō". (Japan), July 1981
- Daiji Katagiri, Ship Name Chronicles of the Imperial Japanese Navy Combined Fleet, Kōjinsha (Japan), June 1988, ISBN 4-7698-0386-9
- "Japan Center for Asian Historical Records (JACAR)"., National Archives of Japan
  - Reference code: A09050130100, Explanatory document on addition of fiscal 1929 estimated expense in 56th Diet
  - Reference code: C05021206200, Inquiry, Response, Notification (6)
  - Reference code: C05022903500, Military Affairs 1, No. 88 June 21, 1933, Traffic ship, Kotaka
  - Reference code: C05021645000, No. 2026 June 15, 1931 Sasebo Navy Arsenal No.10-26, Establishing part of equipment for traffic ship Kotaka
- Fukui, Matasuke; Hiraga, Yuzuru; Taji, Yasushi (1931-10-31). "Kotaka (60 tons traffic ship), about lifting". Shipbuilding Association Newsletter. 48. Shipbuilding Association. NDL degital collections PID:10783104.

== Sources ==
- Japanese gunboats (with photos) (in Japanese)
- Vessels of the IJN
- Monograph 144 Chapter II
