= Japanese gunboat Sumida (1903) =

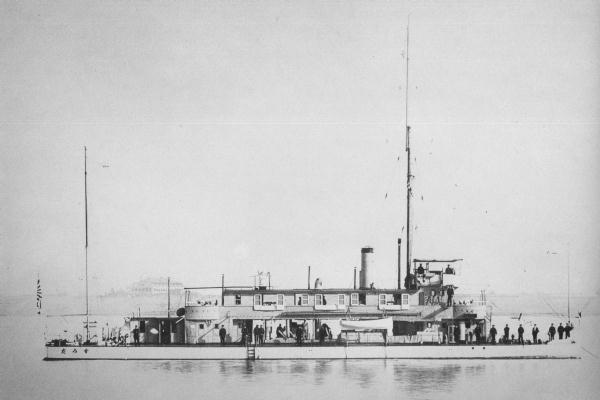
- Japanese gunboat Sumida in 1912

History

Japan
- Name: Sumida
- Ordered: 1903 Fiscal Year
- Builder: John I. Thornycroft & Company
- Laid down: January 1903
- Launched: June 26, 1903
- Commissioned: April 17, 1906
- Stricken: March 1, 1935
- Fate: Scrapped March 1935

General characteristics
- Type: River gunboat
- Displacement: 126 long tons (128 t)
- Length: 44.2 m (145 ft)
- Beam: 7.63 m (25 ft 0 in)
- Draught: 0.61 m (2 ft 0 in)
- Propulsion: reciprocating steam engine; 2 shaft, 2 boilers; 680 shp
- Speed: 13 knots (15 mph; 24 km/h)
- Range: 300 tons coal
- Complement: 44
- Armament: 2 × 47 mm (1.9 in)/40 cal. Hotchkiss guns; 4 × machine guns

Sumida (隅田) was a river gunboat in the Imperial Japanese Navy. It was named after the Sumida River in Tokyo, Japan.

== History ==
Sumida was the first gunboat in the Imperial Japanese Navy inventory designed specifically for inland river service. The need for such a vessel to operate on the rivers of the Asian mainland to protect Japanese commercial interests at various treaty ports had been perceived even before the Boxer Rebellion. The Japanese government turned to the United Kingdom, and placed an order for such two such vessels in 1903: one the Sumida to John I. Thornycroft & Company and the other Fushimi to Yarrow Shipbuilders in Scotland. Sumida, was slightly larger than Fushimi and easily distinguishable by having one smokestack to Fushimi's twin stack.

Sumida was launched in June 1903, but was brought to Shanghai for final fitting out, but work was halted by official British neutrality in the Russo-Japanese War, the unfinished ship was impounded in until the end of that conflict. She was finally commissioned into the Japanese navy as a second-class gunboat on April 17, 1906.

Sumida remained based at the International Settlement in Shanghai. During World War I, due to the official neutrality of the Republic of China, Sumida's weaponry was placed under lock in 1914, and was not freed until China officially joined the Allies.

Sumida saw combat service in the Second Sino-Japanese War, beginning with the First Shanghai Incident in 1931. Sumida continued to operate on the Yangtze River in China during the early 1930s, but was already considered obsolete, and was struck from the navy list on March 1, 1935. She was scrapped on March 31, 1935 at Shanghai.
