= Show of force =

Open demonstration of military power intended to warn or to intimidate an opponent

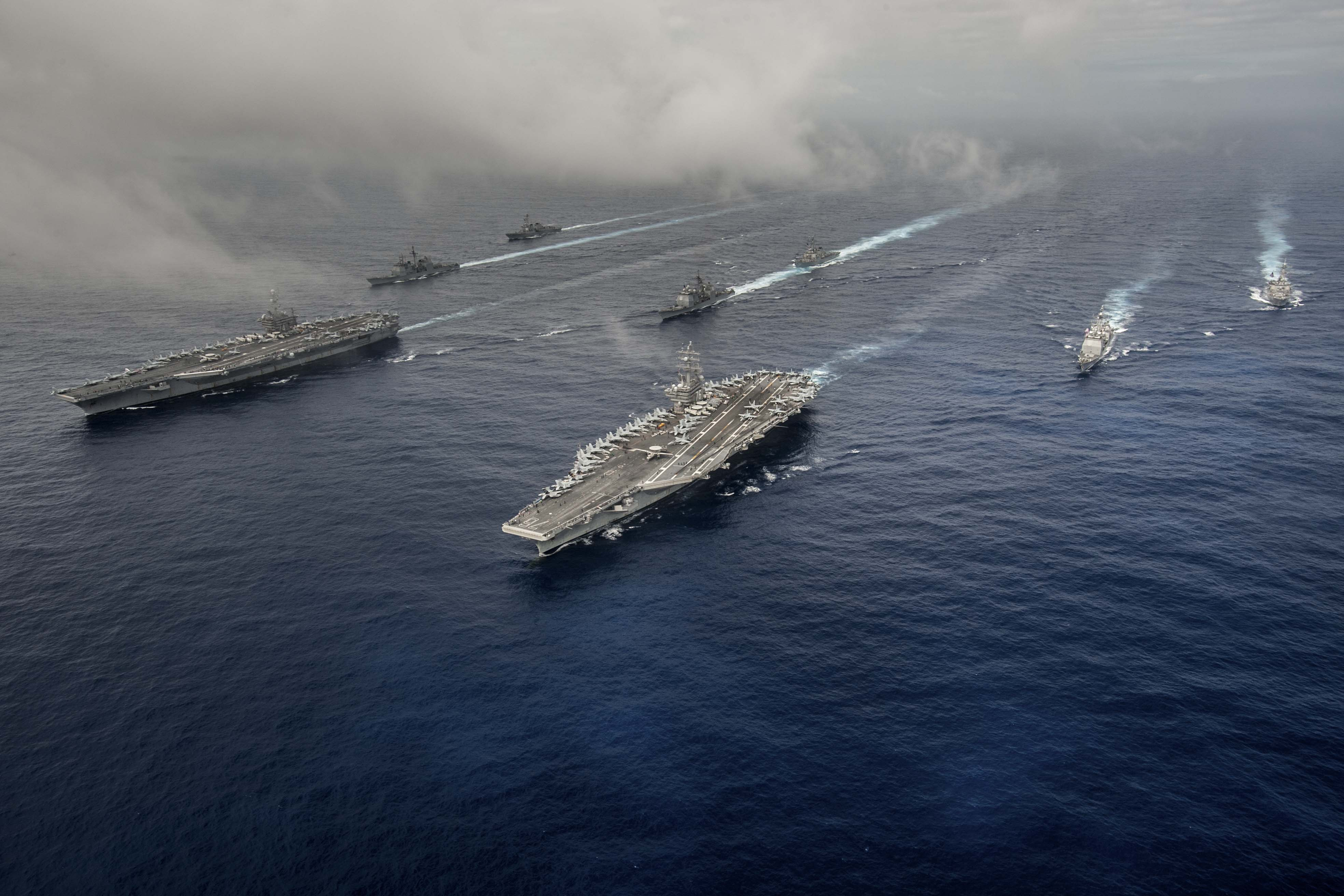
The aircraft carriers USS John C. Stennis (CVN 74) and USS Ronald Reagan (CVN 76) conducting dual aircraft carrier strike group operations and showing presence in the Indo-Asia-Pacific.

A show of force is a military operation intended to warn (such as a warning shot) or to intimidate an opponent by showcasing a capability or will to act if one is provoked. Shows of force may also be executed by police forces and other armed, non-military groups.

== Function ==
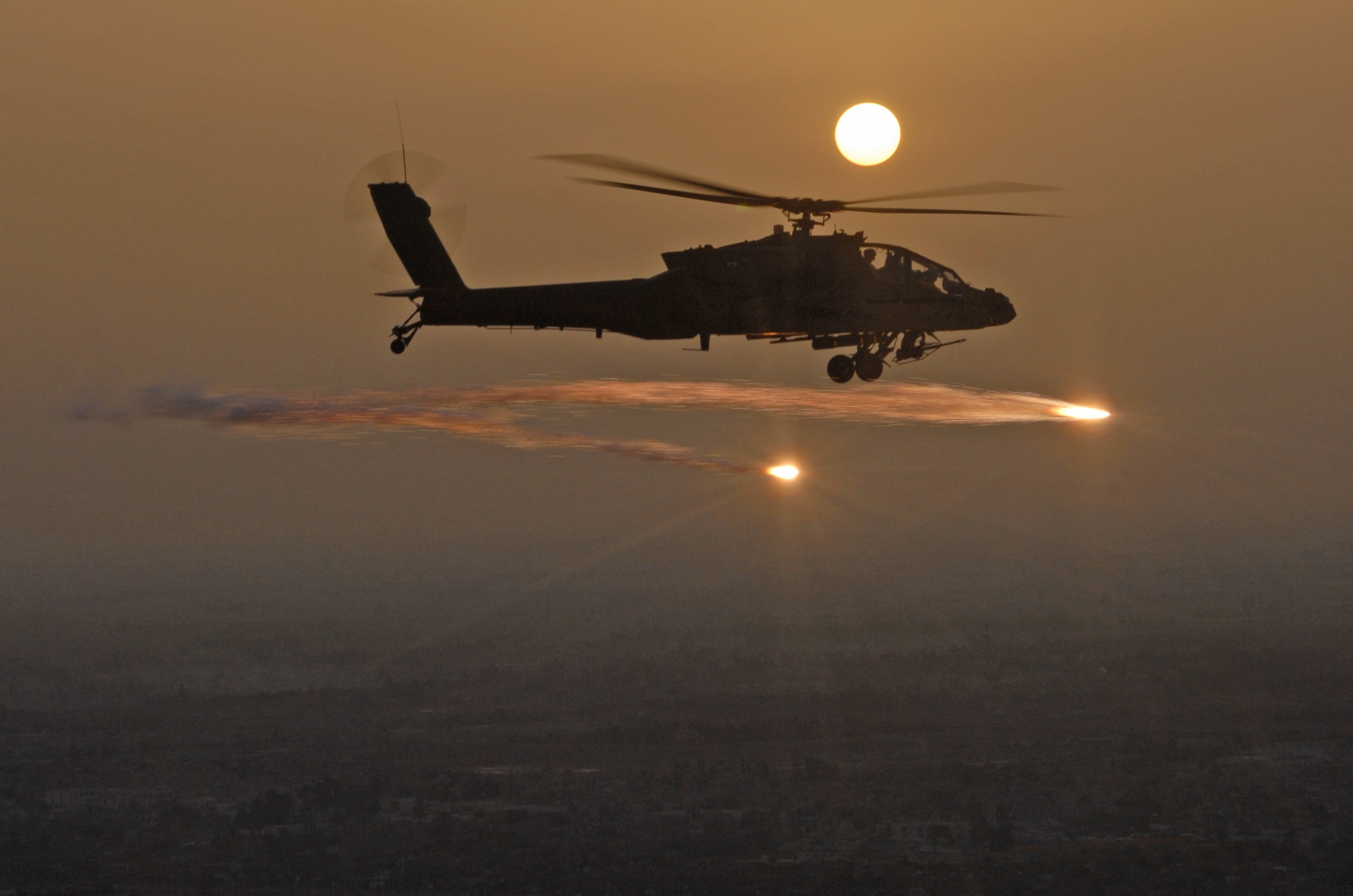
Many strike missions by aircraft over insurgency areas involve the use of flare drops and low-level passes only and are intended to intimidate suspected enemy forces rather than to be immediately used for attacks.

Shows of force have historically been undertaken mostly by a military actor unwilling to engage in all-out hostilities, but fearing to 'lose face' (to appear weak). By performing a carefully calculated provocation, the opponent is to be shown that violent confrontation remains an option, and there will be no backing off on the principle that the show of force is to defend.

Shows of force may be actual military operations, but in times of official peace, they may also be limited to military exercises.

Shows of force also work on a smaller scale: military forces on a tactical level using mock attacks to deter potential opponents, especially when a real attack on suspected (but unconfirmed) enemies might harm civilians. As an example, most air "attacks" during Operation Enduring Freedom and Operation Iraqi Freedom have been simple shows of force with jet aircraft dropping flares only while making loud, low-level passes. A 2009 12-month report for Afghanistan noted 18,019 strike sorties by US military aircraft, with weapons use for only 3,330 of the missions.

== Notable examples ==
- Operation Paul Bunyan, carried out on August 21, 1976 by American and UNC troops into the Korean Demilitarized Zone in reaction to the unprovoked killing of two United States Army officers by Korean People's Army soldiers in the Korean axe murder incident.
- Operation Poomalai, on 4 June 1987, the Indian Air Force mounted a mercy mission to airdrop humanitarian relief supplies over the besieged town of Jaffna in Sri Lanka during the Sri Lankan Civil War. The mission was undertaken as a symbolic act of support for the Tamil Tigers two days after a previous unarmed effort which was mounted in the form of a small naval flotilla and was thwarted by the Sri Lankan Navy.
- Third Taiwan Strait Crisis, was the effect of a series of missile tests conducted by the People's Republic of China in the waters surrounding Taiwan including the Taiwan Strait from 21 July 1995 to 23 March 1996. The first set of missiles fired in mid to late 1995 were allegedly intended to send a strong signal to the Republic of China government under Lee Teng-hui, who had been seen as moving ROC foreign policy away from the One-China policy. The second set of missiles were fired in early 1996, allegedly intending to intimidate the Taiwanese electorate in the run-up to the 1996 presidential election.
- Operation Restore Democracy in Gambia to remove the former president Yahya Jammeh. Nigerian jets flew over Banjul and ECOWAS forces surrounded Gambia's borders to deter resistance from the smaller Gambian army.

== See also ==
- Demoralization (warfare)
- Deterrence theory
- Gunboat diplomacy
- Peace through strength
- Shock and awe
