= Sentai =

Japanese military unit

In Japanese, sentai (戦隊) is a military unit and may be literally translated as "squadron", "task force", "division (of ships)", "group" or "wing". The terms "regiment" and "flotilla", while sometimes used as translations of sentai, are also used to refer to larger formations.

== Imperial Japanese aviation sentai ==
The term was used during World War II by the military of the Empire of Japan for Imperial Japanese Army Air Service (IJAAS) and Imperial Japanese Navy Air Service (IJNAS) military aviation units equivalent to a group or wing in other air forces. However, the term had slightly different meanings in the IJAAS and the IJNAS.

An IJAAS Sentai was made up of two to four squadrons (chūtai). In the IJAAS, two or more Sentai comprised a hikōdan (air brigade). In the later stages of World War II, the IJAAS abolished chūtai and divided its sentai into hikōtai (flying units) and seibitai (maintenance units). A sentai commander (sentaichō) was generally a lieutenant colonel.

In the IJNAS, a sentai was a larger unit: a Kōkūtai was the equivalent of an IJAAS sentai. Several sentai made up a kantai (air fleet). In the IJNAS, a Sentaichō was usually a naval captain.

== Imperial Japanese naval sentai ==
Sentai in the Japanese Navy were prescribed by the document Naval military command No. 10, Kantairei (艦隊令) dated 30 November 1914.

Paraphrased, they were defined as follows:

- Sentai (戦隊; Battleship Division, Battlecruiser Division, Cruiser Division, Minelayer Division or Coast Defence Ship Division): comprising two or more warships of the same type.
- Kōkū Sentai (航空戦隊; Carrier Division or Air Flotilla): comprising two or more aircraft carriers, seaplane tenders or air groups.
- Suirai Sentai (水雷戦隊; Torpedo Squadron or Cruiser-Destroyer Squadron): comprising two or more destroyers, possibly with a light cruiser as a squadron flagship.
- Sensui Sentai (潜水戦隊; Submarine Squadron): comprising two or more submarines, with a submarine tender or cruiser as submarine squadron leader, and some submarine divisions. The 1st Sensui Sentai was formed on 1 April 1919 from the former 4th Suirai Sentai.
- Yusō Sentai (輸送戦隊; Landing Ship Squadron): comprising two or more landing ship divisions. First unit the 1st Yusō Sentai was organized on 25 September 1944.
- Tokkō Sentai (特攻戦隊; Suicide Attack Division): comprising a mother ship and individual suicide weapons, such as Kaiten, Kairyū, Kōryū and Shin'yō. The first such unit was the 1st Tokkō Sentai, organized on 20 March 1945.

== Cultural references ==
The Super Sentai Series (スーパー戦隊シリーズ, Sūpā Sentai Shirīzu) is a franchise of Japanese tokusatsu television dramas produced by Toei and TV Asahi that uses the word sentai to describe a group of three or more costumed superheroes who often pilot fictional robotic vehicles to fight kaiju. Later, Power Rangers.

== See also ==
- Senshi (disambiguation)

== Bibliography ==
- Series 100 year histories from Meiji Era, Ministry of the Navy, printed by Hara Shobō (Japan)
  - Vol. 173, Histories of Naval organizations #3 (1), original printing in 1939, reprint in May 1971
  - Vol. 174, Histories of Naval organizations #3 (2), original printing in 1939, reprint in July 1971
