= Gromki =

Gromki, Gromkiy, or Gromky (Russian: Громкий, lit. 'Loud') may refer to:

- Gromki, Bartoszyce County
- Gromki, Kętrzyn County
- Gromki, Rudnyansky District, Volgograd Oblast
- Gromki, Svetloyarsky District, Volgograd Oblast
- Russian corvette Gromkiy
- Russian destroyer Gromki, ships of the Imperial Russian Navy
- Soviet destroyer Gromky
- Soviet frigate Gromkiy

== See also ==
- Brzóski-Gromki
