= 13th Division (Imperial Japanese Army) =

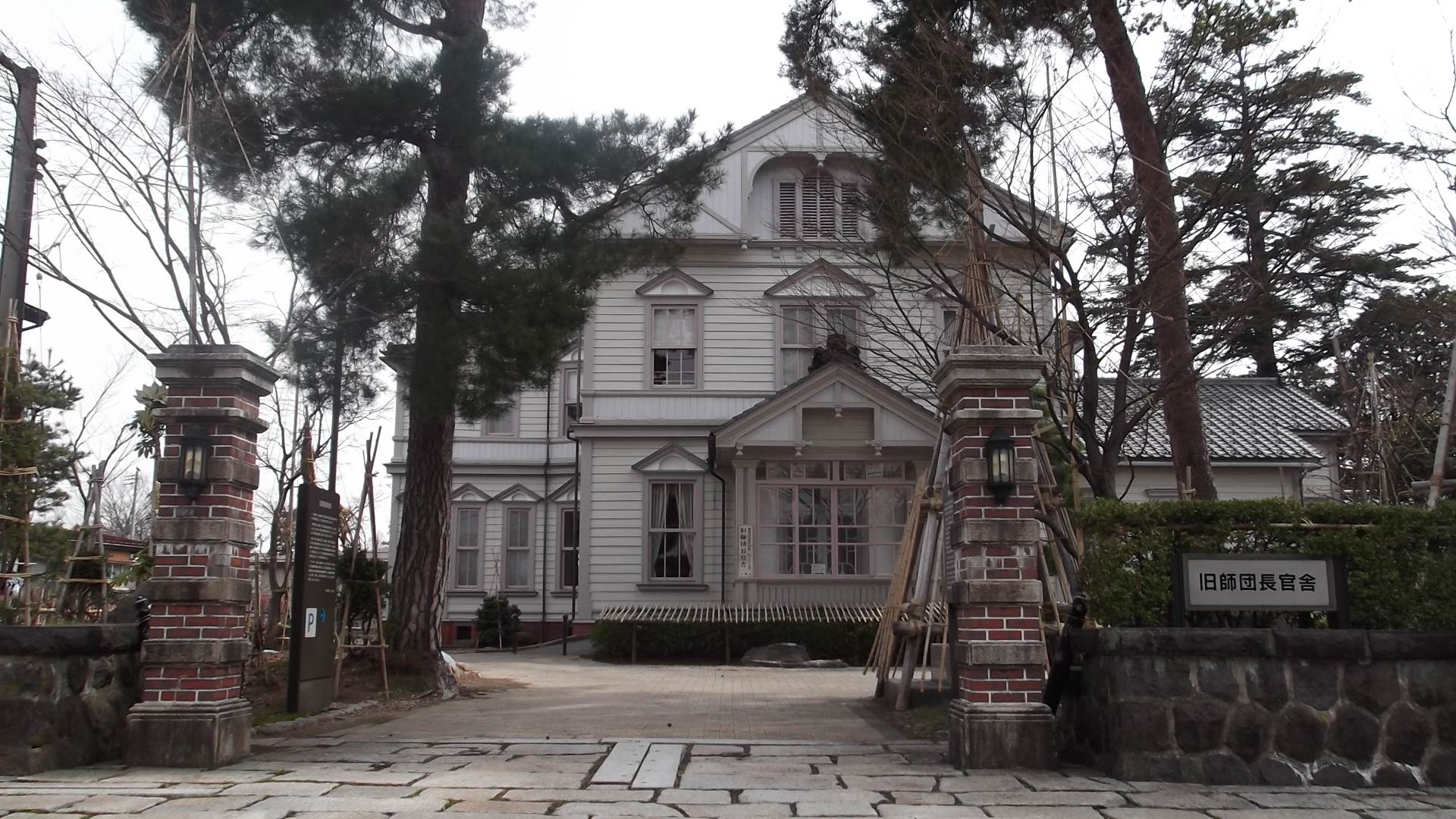
- former IJA 13th Division HQ in Joetsu, Niigata
- Active: 1 April 1905 – 1 May 1925; 10 September 1937 – 1945
- Country: Empire of Japan
- Branch: Imperial Japanese Army
- Type: Infantry
- Size: 25,000 men
- Garrison/HQ: Takada, Japan
- Nickname(s): Mirror Division
- Engagements: Russo-Japanese War; Second Sino-Japanese War; World War II

Commanders
- Notable commanders: Eitaro Uchiyama

The 13th Division (第13師団, Dai Jūsan Shidan) was an infantry division in the Imperial Japanese Army. Its tsūshōgō code name was the Mirror Division (鏡兵団, Kagami-heidan), and its military symbol was 13D. The 13th Division was one of four new infantry divisions raised by the Imperial Japanese Army (IJA) in the closing stages of the Russo-Japanese War 1 April 1905, after it turned out what the entire IJA was committed to combat in Manchuria, leaving not a single division to guard the Japanese home islands from attack.

== Action ==
=== Russo-Japanese War ===
The 13th Division was initially raised in Takada city in now Jōetsu, Niigata from men in Niigata Prefecture under the command of Lieutenant General Haraguchi Kensai. It was given the independent assignment of occupying Sakhalin before the conclusion of the Portsmouth Treaty, landing on Sakhalin on 7 July 1905, only three months after being formed, and securing the island by 1 August 1905. As a result of its successful operation, Japan was awarded southern Karafuto during the Portsmouth Treaty, one of Japan's few territorial gains during the war.

=== Interwar period ===
The division returned on 6 November 1908 to its original divisional headquarters located in Takada, Niigata prefecture. Future Chinese premier Chiang Kai-shek served in the field artillery battalion of the 13th Division while it was based at Takada. Also while at Takada, under the command of Lieutenant General Gaishi Nagaoka, a military advisor from the Empire of Austria-Hungary, Theodor Edler von Lerch, was invited to teach mountain warfare and skiing to the troops of the IJA 58th Infantry Regiment in Takada under the 13th Division in early 1911.

On 12 April 1913, the division was ordered to Liaoyang in Manchuria, where it remained until 3 June 1915 on garrison duty under the command of Lieutenant General Akiyama Yoshifuru before returning to Takada. After a brief period on garrison duty in Korea, the 13th Division was one of the divisions selected to participate in the Japanese intervention in Siberia in 1920. The 13th division of that period specialized in winter warfare, with all infantry on skis.

However, on 1 May 1925, it was dissolved by Minister of War Ugaki Kazushige as part of a cost-saving measure during the Kato Takaaki administration, together with the 15th, 17th and 18th divisions.

=== Second Sino-Japanese War ===
In July 1937, open hostilities broke out against China and the Second Sino-Japanese War commenced. The 13th Division was re-established in Sendai on 10 September 1937 as a triangular division, out of the reserve forces of the IJA 2nd Division, and ordered to China 11 September 1937 together with 9th division and 101st division. Under the command of Lieutenant General Rippei Ogisu, it was assigned to Shanghai Expeditionary Army and saw combat during the Battle of Shanghai and Battle of Nanjing, although as a reserve force it was not present at the subsequent Nanjing Massacre. It came under the control of the Central China Expeditionary Army from February 1938, the 13th Division it was at the Battle of Xuzhou, and as part of the Japanese Second Army from July 1938, it was at the Battle of Wuhan under the command of Lieutenant General Shizuichi Tanaka.

From November 1938, the 13th Division was assigned to the Japanese Eleventh Army and remained in China throughout the Pacific War, participating in numerous campaigns and battles, notably the Battle of Zaoyang–Yichang, Battle of West Hubei and Battle of Changde. A particularly heavy Chinese attacks in Yichang were repulsed in October 1941 with the extensive use of chemical weapons by 13th division. In December 1942, the 58th infantry regiment was transferred to the 31st division, and 13th division has become a triangular division. It was also part of Operation Ichi-Go (the Battle of Henan-Hunan-Guangxi). In the final stages of the campaign 1 November 1944, the 13th division has captured two airstrips at Guilin airbase. Later it was used to secure the front on the west of Liuzhou, between 3rd division to the south and 58th division to the north-east. 18 April 1945, it was assigned to directly to the China Expeditionary Army together with 3rd division and was retreating toward Nanjing. The capitulation of Japan 15 August 1945 has happened while the 13th division was in Changsha, Hunan Province.

Although there were plans to send the 13th Division to Guam in September 1943 to counter the threat posed by the United States in the Pacific War, only a 300-man detachment was sent.

== See also ==
- List of Japanese Infantry divisions
