= Japanese destroyer Yūgiri =

Three Japanese destroyers have been named Yūgiri (夕霧 / ゆうぎり, "evening mist"):

- Japanese destroyer Yūgiri (1899), a Murakumo-class destroyer of the Imperial Japanese Navy during the Russo-Japanese War
- Japanese destroyer Yūgiri (1930), a Fubuki-class destroyer of the Imperial Japanese Navy during World War II
- JS Yūgiri, an Asagiri-class destroyer of the Japan Maritime Self-Defense Force
