= Japanese destroyer Murakumo =

Three Japanese destroyers have been named Murakumo (叢雲 / むらくも, ”massed clouds”):

- Japanese destroyer Murakumo (1898), a Murakumo-class destroyer of the Imperial Japanese Navy in the Russo-Japanese War and World War I
- Japanese destroyer Murakumo (1928), a Fubuki-class destroyer of the Imperial Japanese Navy in World War II
- JDS Murakumo, a Minegumo-class destroyer of the Japan Maritime Self-Defense Force

== See also ==
- Murakumo (disambiguation)
