= Murakumo =

Murakumo (叢雲 / むらくも, ”gathering clouds”) may refer to:

- Kusanagi, a legendary Japanese sword and one of three Imperial Regalia of Japan.
- Murakumo-class destroyer, a class of destroyers of the Imperial Japanese Navy
- Japanese destroyer Murakumo, three destroyers of the Imperial Japanese Navy and the Japanese Maritime Self-Defense Force
- Murakumo: Renegade Mech Pursuit, a video game
