= Japanese destroyer Kagerō (1899) =

Murakumo-class destroyer

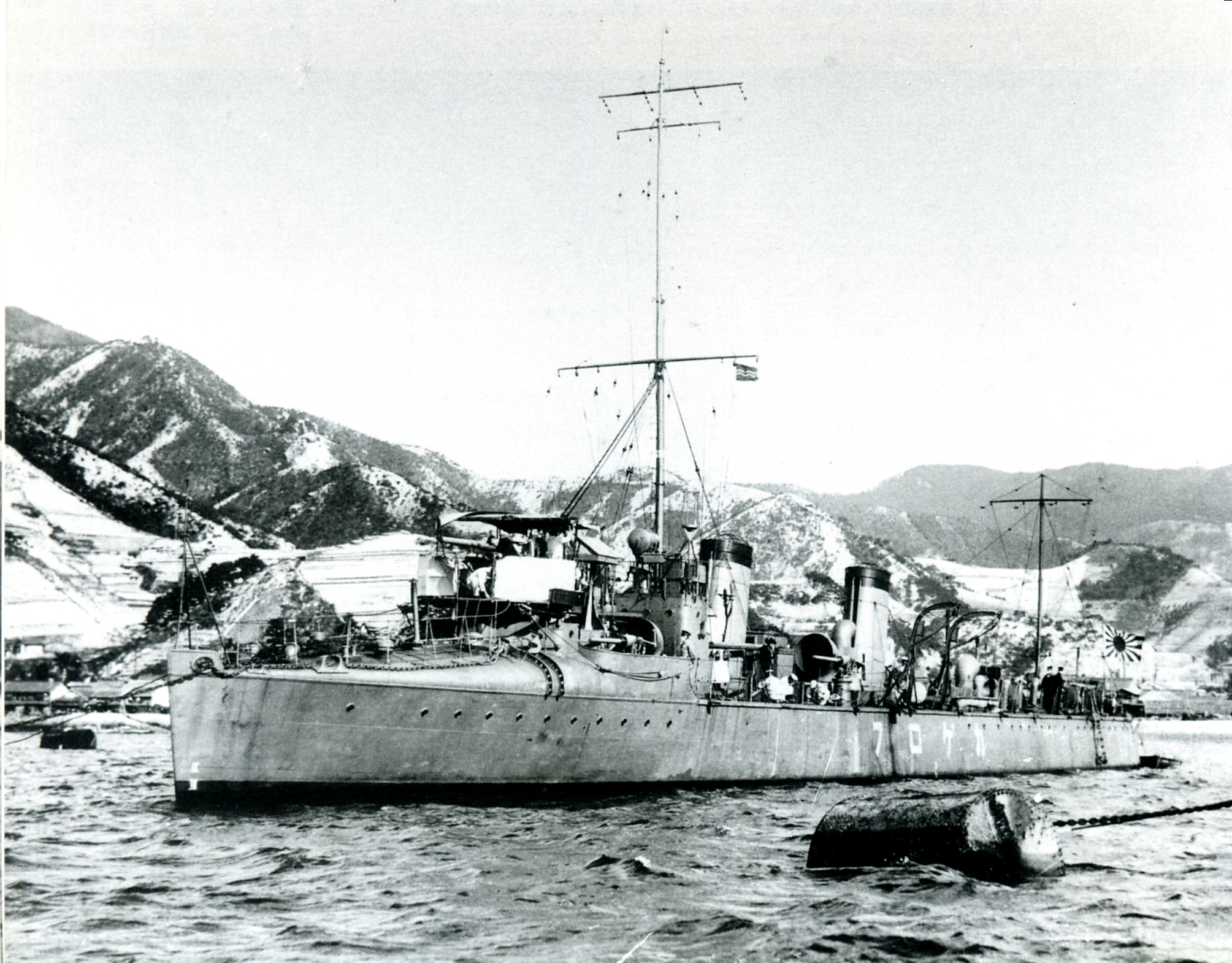
- Kagerō at Kure, Japan, in 1920.

History

Empire of Japan
- Name: Kagerō
- Namesake: 陽炎 ("Mirage")
- Ordered: 1897
- Builder: John I. Thornycroft & Company, Chiswick, England
- Yard number: Torpedo Boat Destroyer No. 9
- Laid down: 1 August 1898
- Launched: 23 August 1899
- Completed: 31 October 1899
- Commissioned: 31 October 1899
- Reclassified: From torpedo boat destroyer to destroyer) 22 June 1900; Third-class destroyer 28 August 1912; Utility vessel (tug and transport) 1 April 1922
- Decommissioned: 8 October 1924
- Stricken: 8 October 1924
- Fate: Hulked

General characteristics
- Type: Murakumo-class destroyer
- Displacement: 275 long tons (279 t) normal; 360.5 long tons (366.3 t) full load
- Length: 208 ft (63 m) waterline, 210 ft (64 m) overall
- Beam: 19 ft 6 in (5.94 m)
- Draught: 6 ft 10 in (2.08 m)
- Depth: 13 ft 6 in (4.11 m)
- Propulsion: Reciprocating engine, 3 boilers, 5,800 ihp (4,300 kW), 2 shafts
- Speed: 30 knots (56 km/h; 35 mph)
- Complement: 50
- Armament: 1 × QF 12-pounder gun; 5 × QF 6 pounder Hotchkiss guns; 2 × 450 mm (18 in) torpedoes

Service record
- Operations: Boxer Rebellion; Russo-Japanese War; Battle of Port Arthur; Battle of the Yellow Sea; Battle of Tsushima; Invasion of Sakhalin; World War I; Siege of Tsingtao

Kagerō (陽炎, "Mirage") was one of six Murakumo-class destroyers, built for the Imperial Japanese Navy in the late 1890s. Kagerō took part in the Japanese response to the Boxer Rebellion (1900), saw action in several major engagements during the Russo-Japanese War (1904–1905), and served during World War I (1914–1918).

== Construction and commissioning ==
Authorized as Torpedo Boat Destroyer No. 9 under the 1897 naval program, Kagerō was laid down on 1 August 1898 by John I. Thornycroft & Company at Chiswick, England. Launched on 23 August 1899, she was completed on 31 October 1899 and commissioned the same day.

== Service history ==
Kagerō completed her delivery voyage from England to Japan on 14 March 1899 with her arrival at Sasebo. During 1900, she took part in the Japanese intervention in the Boxer Rebellion in China.

When the Russo-Japanese War broke out in February 1904, Kagerō was part of the 5th Destroyer Division of the 2nd Fleet. During the war, she took part in the Battle of Port Arthur in February 1904, the Battle of the Yellow Sea in August 1904, and the Battle of Tsushima in May 1905. During the Battle of Tsushima, Kagerō took part in a torpedo attack against the Imperial Russian Navy squadron on the evening of 27 May 1905, then put into port along with the destroyer Sazanami at Ulsan, Korea, for reprovisioning and repairs. The two destroyers got back underway on the morning of 28 May 1905 to head for a fleet rendezvous, and sighted smoke from the Russian destroyers Bedovyi and Groznyi in the Sea of Japan about 40 nautical miles (74 km; 46 mi) southwest of Ulleungdo (then often called "Matsushima") at 14:15. At 16:00, they identified the smoke as coming from two Russian destroyers and gave chase at 23 knots (43 km/h; 26 mph), and as the Japanese closed the range, Groznyi received orders at 16:30 to proceed on her own and try to escape. With the range down to 4,000 yards (3,700 m) at 16:45, the Japanese opened gunfire, and Groznyi returned fire and made off at high speed with Kagerō in hot pursuit. Meanwhile, Bedovyi refrained from firing and promptly stopped and surrendered to Sazanami, whose boarding party found the wounded Russian fleet commander, Vice Admiral Zinovy Rozhestvensky, aboard and took him prisoner in addition to capturing the ship. Kagerō also took part in the Japanese invasion of Sakhalin in July 1905.

On 28 August 1912, the Imperial Japanese Navy revised its ship classification standards. It established three categories of destroyers, with those of 1,000 displacement tons or more defined as first-class destroyers, those of 600 to 999 displacement tons as second-class destroyers, and those of 599 or fewer displacement tons as third-class destroyers. Under this classification scheme, Kagerō became a third-class destroyer.

After Japan entered World War I in August 1914, Kagerō operated off Tsingtao, China, in support of the Siege of Tsingtao. Later that year, she took part in the Japanese seizure of the German Empire′s colonial possessions in the Caroline, Mariana, and Marshall Islands.

On 1 April 1922 Kagerō was reclassified as a "utility vessel" for use as a tug and transport. On 8 October 1924, she was decommissioned, stricken from the navy list, and hulked.

== Commanding officers ==
- Lieutenant Commander Danjiro Iwamura 14 February 1899 – unknown (pre-commissioning)
- Lieutenant Yoshimaru Sakurai 22 June 1900 – 25 September 1900
- Lieutenant Commander Gonsaburo Horiuchi 25 September 1900 – 10 September 1901
- Lieutenant Commander Kishiro Takebe 10 September 1901 – 30 April 1903
- Lieutenant Atsuyuki Ide 30 April 1903 – unknown
- Lieutenant Abira Yoshikawa 27 March 1905 – 12 December 1905
- Lieutenant Koichi Masuda 17 December 1905 – 30 August 1906
- Lieutenant Commander Kotaro Inoyama: 30 August 1906 – 27 April 1907
- Lieutenant Yokojiji 27 April 1907 – 26 August 1907
- Lieutenant Eijiro Tanabe 26 August 1907 – 28 May 1908
- Lieutenant Naonobu Hirata 28 May 1908 – 20 November 1908
- Lieutenant Kennosuke Matsumoto 20 November 1908 – 1 March 1910
- Lieutenant Fujita Kotaro 1 March 1910 – 1 December 1910
- Lieutenant Masanao Saruwatari 1 December 1910 – 22 May 1911
- Lieutenant Shoichi Yamashita 22 May 1911 – 9 October 1911
- Lieutenant Tomonobu Nakayama 9 October 1911 – 1 February 1912
- Lieutenant Sueo Yonehara 1 February 1912 – 1 December 1912
- Lieutenant Maruyama Hanzaburo 1 December 1912 – 1 December 1913
- Lieutenant Commander Eijiro Tanabe 1 December 1913 – 7 August 1914
- Lieutenant Shoichi Ishida 7 August 1914 – 1 May 1915
- Lieutenant Aritoshi Nakamura 1 May 1915 – 1 June 1916
- Lieutenant Chuzo Kawahara 1 June 1916 – 1 December 1916
- Lieutenant Yoshihiro Imaizumi 1 December 1916 – 23 August 1917
- Lieutenant Shinjuro Takahashi 23 August 1917 – 6 February 1919
- Lieutenant Hayami Nishimura 6 February 1919 – 18 October 1919
- Lieutenant Kiyoshi Suzuki 18 October 1919 – 27 December 1919
- Lieutenant Commander Shozo Wada 2 December 1919 – 1 June 1920
- Lieutenant Commander Aragasu 1 June 1920 – 1 December 1920
- Lieutenant Shichiro Ikeda 1 December 1920 – 20 November 1921
- Lieutenant Yoshimasa Horie 20 November 1921 – 1 December 1921
- Lieutenant Miyazaki Taira 1 December 1921 – unknown
