= Mikhail Nikolaevich Lyapunov =

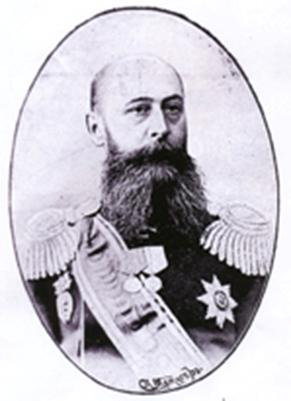

Military Governor of Sakhalin
- In office 8 May 1898 – 31 January 1906
- Monarch: Nicholas II
- Prime Minister: Sergei Witte
- Preceded by: Vladimir Dmitrievich Merkazin
- Succeeded by: Arkady Mikhailovich Valuev

Personal details
- Born: 1 March 1848 Saint Petersburg, Russian Empire
- Died: 4 March 1909 (aged 61) Saint Petersburg, Russian Empire

Military service
- Allegiance: Russian Empire
- Branch/service: Imperial Russian Army
- Years of service: 1864–1906
- Rank: Lieutenant General
- Battles/wars: Russo-Japanese War; Japanese invasion of Sakhalin

Mikhail Nikolaevich Lyapunov (Russian: Михаил Николаевич Ляпунов; 1 March 1848 — 4 March 1909) was Russian statesman and military leader and a participant in the Russo-Japanese War.

== Biography ==
Lyapunov was born into a family of hereditary nobles of Saint Petersburg Governorate. He received his secondary education at the Saint Petersburg military gymnasium and at the age of 16 he was enrolled as a cadet at the Pavel Military School . At the age of 20 he was promoted to the rank of lieutenant. The command noticed Lyapunov's legal abilities and he was sent to Odessa to the Military Law Academy.

Lyapunov was promoted to staff-captain on 6 November 1872, captain from 21 October 1875, major on 20 February 1876, captain of the military judicial department from 1 April 1877, assistant military prosecutor and lieutenant colonel from 17 April 1879 and finally promoted to colonel on 30 August 1882. In December 1884 he received the post of military judge. From 27 June 1887 to 17 October 1893 he was the military prosecutor of the Kazan military district court. In August 1892, for his good service, Emperor Alexander III promoted him to major general. From 17 October 1893 to 8 May 1898 he was the military prosecutor of the Moscow Military District Court. He was considered a highly educated and well-trained official and was distinguished by "strict performance of official duties", an energetic character and had moral impeccability.

In 1898, by order of Emperor Nicholas II, Lyapunov was appointed military governor and chief of the local troops on Sakhalin Island. The order was signed on 8 May, but Lyapunov was in no hurry to go. He lived in Saint Petersburg, resolved issues with the appointment and transfer of affairs, looked for employees for his staff, despite the fact that the Governor-General of the Amur Region was constantly urging him to take up his post, because Sakhalin had been without a military commander for almost a year. Lyapunov arrived on the island on 19 August and took up his post on 20 August. He brought with him the new head of the chancellery, Lieutenant V. Marchenko, the former governor of affairs of the Kazan district of communications.

As the governor, Lyapunov made frequent visits with audits to Korsakovsky and Rykovsky (Modern-Day Tymovsky) districts. Unlike his predecessors, he constantly asked for an audience with the Governor-General of the Amur Region, and tried to make reports, if not to Saint Petersburg, then at least to Khabarovsk. He managed to visit European Russia and decide on the introduction of the post of vice-governor of Sakhalin. In 1902, Friedrich Fedorovich von Bunge was appointed to this position.

On 27 January 1904, the Russo-Japanese War began. The Japanese command began hostilities on Sakhalin by cutting off the only route connecting the island with the mainland, thus Japanese forces were able to cut off and encircle the Russian troops. On 17 July 1905, the military governor and chief of the forces of Sakhalin Island, Lieutenant General Lyapunov, through a representative, sent a message to the commander of the Japanese expeditionary forces, Lieutenant General Haraguchi Kensai: "Your Excellency! The lack of medicines and dressings and, as a result, the lack of the possibility of rendering assistance to the wounded, forced me to propose to Your Excellency to cease hostilities for purely humane reasons." In response, General Haraguchi demanded that General Lyapunov surrender all weapons and all movable and immovable state property that were intact, as well as the surrender of all maps, documents, papers related to the military department and administration.

On 19 July 1905, Lyapunov, who was at his headquarters in the village of Onor, gave the order: "The lack of food and firearms, as well as entrenching tools, the lack of sanitary facilities, the enormous numerical superiority of the Japanese army and the absence of a prepared path of retreat put us in such a situation when which further resistance would be useless bloodshed. In view of this, having received an offer from the commander of the Japanese army, which landed on the island, to surrender, I convened a military council, at which, to discuss the general situation...".

Official records suggest that the total surrendered forces consisted of the garrison of 3,200 lower ranks, 79 officers and one general, Lyapunov himself, who became the only Russian governor to surrender during that war. In fact, there were more prisoners: in addition to those who surrendered in Onor, in other parts of Sakhalin the Japanese captured at least 1,260 soldiers and officers. A significant amount of weapons, ammunition, food and fodder passed into the hands of the Japanese.

On 31 January 1906, Lyapunov was dismissed by the emperor from the post of military governor and was assigned to the General Staff for the military-judicial department, then in the same year he was dismissed. After retirement he lived in Saint Petersburg in the building of the Evangelical Hospital, and then settled in the house number 11 on the street. He died on 4 March 1909.

== Family ==
- Wife - Elena Ivanovna Lyapunova

== Awards ==
- Order of Saint Stanislaus, 3rd class (1873)
- Order of Saint Anna, 3rd class (1881)
- Order of Saint Stanislaus, 2nd class (1883)
- Order of Order of Saint Anna, 2nd class (1887)
- Order of Saint Vladimir, 3rd class (1894)
- Order of Saint Stanislaus, 1st class (1897)
- Order of Order of Saint Anna, 1st class (1905)
- Silver Medal "In Commemoration of the Reign of Emperor Alexander III"

== Bibliography ==
- Lyapunov Mikhail Nikolaevich (1906). List of generals by seniority. Compiled on July 1, 1906. St. Petersburg: Military printing house. p. 296.
- Имена в истории Сахалина. Михаил Николаевич Ляпунов
- «Совершенно секретно», No.27/356
- Аркадий Векслер, Тамара Крашенинникова «Такая удивительная Лиговка»
