= Japanese destroyer Shiranui (1899) =

Murakumo-class destroyer

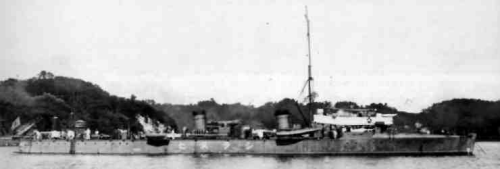
- Shiranui anchored shortly after commissioning, May 1899

History

Empire of Japan
- Name: Shiranui
- Namesake: 不知火 ("Phosphorescent Foam")
- Ordered: 1896
- Builder: John I. Thornycroft & Company, Chiswick, England
- Laid down: 1 January 1898
- Launched: 15 March 1899
- Completed: 13 May 1899
- Commissioned: 13 May 1899
- Reclassified: From torpedo boat destroyer to destroyer 22 June 1900; Third-class destroyer 28 August 1912; Special service vessel (second-class minesweeper) 1 April 1922; Second-class minesweeper 30 June 1923
- Stricken: 1 August 1923
- Renamed: No. 2526 1 August 1923
- Reclassified: General utility vessel (cargo ship) 1 August 1923
- Decommissioned: 25 February 1925
- Fate: Hulked 25 February 1925

General characteristics
- Type: Murakumo-class destroyer
- Displacement: 275 long tons (279 t) normal; 360.5 long tons (366.3 t) full load
- Length: 208 ft (63 m) waterline, 210 ft (64 m) overall
- Beam: 19 ft 6 in (5.94 m)
- Draught: 6 ft 10 in (2.08 m)
- Depth: 13 ft 6 in (4.11 m)
- Propulsion: Reciprocating engine, 3 boilers, 5,800 ihp (4,300 kW), 2 shafts
- Speed: 30 knots (56 km/h; 35 mph)
- Complement: 50
- Armament: 1 × QF 12-pounder gun; 5 × QF 6 pounder Hotchkiss guns; 2 × 450 mm (18 in) torpedoes

Service record
- Operations: Russo-Japanese War; Battle of Port Arthur; Battle of the Yellow Sea; Battle of Tsushima; World War I; Siege of Tsingtao

Shiranui (不知火, "Phosphorescent Foam") was one of six Murakumo-class destroyers built for the Imperial Japanese Navy in the late 1890s. Shiranui took part in several major engagements during the Russo-Japanese War (1904–1905) and served during World War I (1914–1918).

== Construction and commissioning ==
Authorized under the 1896 naval program, Shiranui was laid down on 1 January 1898 by John I. Thornycroft & Company at Chiswick, England. Launched on 15 March 1899, she was completed on 13 May 1899 and commissioned the same day, classified as a torpedo boat destroyer.

== Service history ==
=== 1899–1904 ===
Shiranui completed her delivery voyage from England to Japan on 10 November 1899 with her arrival at Yokosuka. She was reclassified as a destroyer on 22 June 1900.

=== Russo-Japanese War ===
When the Russo-Japanese War broke out in February 1904, Shiranui was part of the 3rd Destroyer Division of the 1st Fleet. She took part in the Battle of Port Arthur in February 1904, the Battle of the Yellow Sea in August 1904, and the Battle of Tsushima in May 1905.

During the Battle of Tsushima, Shiranui served as flagship of the 5th Destroyer Division. She participated in a large Japanese torpedo attack against the Imperial Russian Navy squadron on the evening of 27 May 1905, during which one of her boilers was knocked out. On the morning of 28 May, she happened upon the badly damaged Russian armored cruiser Admiral Nakhimov off Tsushima as Admiral Nakhimov′s crew was preparing to blow her up and scuttle her. Shiranui fired a challenging shot, to which the men who had abandoned ship in Admiral Nakhimov′s boats responded with surrender flags. Shiranui′s crew demanded that Admiral Nakhimov surrender and warned that they would give the Russians in the boats no quarter if any attempt was made to sink the cruiser to prevent her capture. Meanwhile, the Japanese auxiliary cruiser Sado Maru arrived on the scene, and crewmen from Shiranui and Sado Maru went aboard Admiral Nakhimov to take possession of her, but found her too heavily damaged to save, and Admiral Nakhimov later sank.

The damaged Russian armored cruiser Vladimir Monomakh then approached, and Shiranui and Sado Maru both headed toward Vladimir Monomakh, which turned away without offering combat. After a chase of over an hour, Vladimir Monomakh stopped, surrendered, and scuttled herself.

Shiranui then pursued the Russian destroyer Gromkiy, which Vladimir Monomakh had ordered to proceed independently in an attempt to escape. Shiranui could make only 20 knots (37 km/h; 23 mph) because of her damaged boiler, and Gromkiy, steaming at 24 knots (44 km/h; 28 mph), seemed on the verge of escaping when Shiranui scored a lucky 12-pounder hit at long range, cutting Gromkiy′s speed to 20 knots (37 km/h; 23 mph) as well. The two destroyers exchanged fire at ranges of 4,000 to 5,000 metres (4,400 to 5,500 yd) as the chase continued until about 11:30, when Gromkiy sighted the Japanese torpedo boat No. 63 ahead. Mistaking No. 63 for a destroyer and believing her escape had been cut off, Gromkiy turned on Shiranui and fired two torpedoes at her at a range of 600 yards (550 m). One torpedo malfunctioned, and Shiranui took evasive action and narrowly avoided the other. Shiranui then stood off and circled Gromkiy, firing at her beyond the effective range of Gromkiy′s guns until Gromkiy capsized and sank at 12:43.

Shiranui took part in the invasion of Sakhalin in July 1905.

=== Later service ===
On 28 August 1912, the Imperial Japanese Navy revised its ship classification standards. It established three categories of destroyers, with those of 1,000 displacement tons or more defined as first-class destroyers, those of 600 to 999 displacement tons as second-class destroyers, and those of 599 or fewer displacement tons as third-class destroyers. Under this classification scheme, Shiranui became a third-class destroyer.

After Japan entered World War I in August 1914, Shiranui operated off Tsingtao, China, in support of the Siege of Tsingtao. Later that year, she took part in the Japanese seizure of the German Empire′s colonial possessions in the Caroline, Mariana, and Marshall Islands.

On 1 April 1922, Shiranui was reclassified as a "special service vessel" for use as a second-class minesweeper. On 30 June 1923 she was reclassified as a second-class minesweeper. On 1 August 1923, she stricken from the navy list, reclassified as a "general utility vessel" for use as a cargo ship, and simultaneously renamed No. 2526. She was decommissioned and hulked on 25 February 1925.

== Commanding officers ==
- Lieutenant Commander Junkichi Yajima 28 June 1898 – 19 October 1898 (pre-commissioning)
- Lieutenant Commander Naoshi Kasama: 19 October 1898 – unknown (pre-commissioning)
- Lieutenant Muramatsu Inoshimatsu: 22 June 1900 – 28 July 1900
- Lieutenant Michizumi Sumimoto: 28 July 1900 – 25 September 1900
- Lieutenant Commander Keikichiro Kobayashi: 25 September 1900 – 22 June 1903
- Lieutenant Commander Hideo Oguro 22 June 1903 – 26 September 1903
- Lieutenant Commander Yujiro Nishio 26 September 1903 – 10 March 1904
- Lieutenant Nitaro Watanabe 10 March 1904 – unknown
- Lieutenant Shozo Kuwajima 11 September 1904 – 12 December 1905
- Lieutenant Commander Shozo Kuwajima: 12 December 1905 – 25 January 1906
- Lieutenant Commander Tashiro Miyoji: 25 January 1906 – 20 March 1906
- Lieutenant Tsuruhiko Horie 20 March 1906 – 23 April 1906
- Lieutenant Commander Kotaro Inoyama 23 April 1906 – 27 April 1907
- Lieutenant Yokojijiji: 27 April 1907 – 28 September 1907
- Lieutenant Atsumi Saito: 28 September 1907 – 10 October 1907
- Lieutenant Tameyoshi Noda: 10 October 1907 – 15 January 1908
- Lieutenant Shinichiro Abe: 15 January 1908 – 16 January 1908
- Lieutenant Tameyoshi Noda: 16 January 1908 – 1 February 1908
- Lieutenant Hachi Soeshimamura: 1 February 1908 – 25 May 1909
- Lieutenant Kenkichi Wada: 25 May 1909 – 15 January 1910
- Lieutenant Tsuneo Abe: 15 January 1910 – 23 May 1911
- Lieutenant Sueo Yonehara: 23 May 1911 – 1 February 1912
- Lieutenant Tomonobu Nakayama: 1 February 1912 – 13 November 1912
- Lieutenant Masafuyu Ogawa: 13 November 1912 – 24 May 1913
- Lieutenant Jitaro Kashima: 24 May 1913 – unknown
- Lieutenant Commander Hanzaburo Maruyama unknown – 8 June 1916
- Lieutenant Yagoro Morita June 8, 1916 – 1 April 1917
- Lieutenant Akira Matsukawa: 1 April 1917 – 1 December 1917
- Lieutenant Akira Okuno: 1 December 1917 – 1 December 1918
- Lieutenant Chiyuki Tosuka: 1 December 1918 – 1 July 1920
- Lieutenant Teizo Hayakawa: 1 July 1920 – 10 November 1921
- Lieutenant Hikojiro Suga: 10 November 1921 – 1 February 1922
- Lieutenant Shinya Oshima: 1 February 1922 - unknown
