= Koshirō Oikawa =

Japanese admiral

Senior Third Rank Koshirō Oikawa
- 及川 古志郎
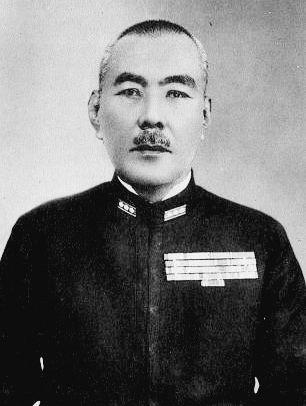

Chief of the Imperial Japanese Navy General Staff
- In office 2 August 1944 – 29 May 1945
- Prime Minister: Kuniaki Koiso; Kantarō Suzuki
- Preceded by: Shimada Shigetarō
- Succeeded by: Soemu Toyoda

Minister of the Navy
- In office 5 September 1940 – 18 October 1941
- Prime Minister: Fumimaro Konoe
- Preceded by: Yoshida Zengo
- Succeeded by: Shimada Shigetarō

Member of the Supreme War Council
- In office 18 October 1941 – 15 November 1943
- Monarch: Hirohito

Personal details
- Born: 16 February 1883 Koshi, Niigata, Japan
- Died: 9 May 1958 (aged 75) Musashino, Tokyo, Japan

Military service
- Allegiance: Empire of Japan
- Branch/service: Imperial Japanese Navy
- Years of service: 1903–1945
- Rank: Admiral
- Commands: Asashio, Yūgiri, Kinu, Tama, Naval Operations Bureau, 1st Carrier Division, Naval Academy, 3rd Fleet, Naval Aviation Bureau, China Area Fleet, Yokosuka Naval District, Naval War College, Maritime Escort Fleet
- Battles/wars: Russo-Japanese War; Battle of Tsushima; World War II; Pacific War

Koshirō Oikawa (及川 古志郎, Oikawa Koshirō; 16 February 1883 – 9 May 1958) was an admiral in the Imperial Japanese Navy and Naval Minister during World War II.

== Biography ==
Oikawa was born into a wealthy family in rural Koshi County, Niigata Prefecture, but was raised in Morioka City, Iwate Prefecture in northern Japan.

He was a graduate of the 31st class of the Imperial Japanese Naval Academy, ranking 76th out of 188 cadets. As a midshipman, he served on the cruisers Itsukushima and Izumo. During the Russo-Japanese War, still as a midshipman, he served on the Chiyoda during the Battle of Tsushima.

As a lieutenant, Oikawa served on the cruiser Katori, and the battleship Mikasa. He was given his first command, the destroyer Asashio on 28 April 1911. He subsequently served on the Yūgiri, before attending the Naval Staff College in 1914.

On graduation, Oikawa was promoted to lieutenant commander, and was appointed aide-de-camp to Crown Prince Hirohito in 1915–1922.

After his promotion to captain on 1 December 1923, Oikawa was assigned the cruiser Kinu, followed by the Tama the following year. He then served in a number of staff positions until his promotion to rear admiral on 10 December 1928. In 1930, Oikawa was appointed to the Imperial Japanese Navy General Staff, and in 1932 became Director of the Imperial Japanese Naval Academy. He was promoted to vice admiral on 15 November 1933. Oikawa strongly supported the London Naval Treaty while a member of the Imperial Japanese Navy General Staff, and was thus a member of the Treaty Faction within the navy.

Oikawa was subsequently appointed Commander in Chief of the IJN 3rd Fleet (1935), Imperial Japanese Navy Aviation Bureau (1936), China Area Fleet (1938) and Yokosuka Naval District (1940). He was promoted to full admiral on 15 November 1939.

Oikawa was appointed as Minister of the Navy in the second and third cabinets of Prime Minister Fumimaro Konoe between 5 September 1940 and 18 October 1941. While Navy Minister, he strove to maintain ties with the United States, and instructed his naval attachés in Washington DC to work together with the Japanese ambassador to prevent war from breaking out. Likewise, he strongly opposed suggestions that Japan should declare war on the Soviet Union in early 1941.

He continued to serve as Naval Councilor to near the end of World War II and was Chief of the Navy General Staff in late 1944 but resigned in May 1945 and was replaced by an Ōita native Toyoda Soemu in an attempt to soften down the Imperial Japanese Army's Ōita-born leadership. Oikawa retired from active duty on 5 September 1945.

Military offices
Preceded by Hyakutake Gengo	3rd Fleet; Commander-in-chief; 1 December 1935 - 1 December 1936	Succeeded by Hasegawa Kiyoshi
Preceded by Hasegawa Kiyoshi	China Area Fleet & 3rd Fleet; Commander-in-chief; 25 April 1938 - 1 May 1940	Succeeded by Shimada Shigetarō
Preceded by Hasegawa Kiyoshi	Yokosuka Naval District; Commander-in-chief; 1 May 1940 - 5 September 1940	Succeeded by Shiozawa Kōichi
Political offices
Preceded by Yoshida Zengo	Minister of the Navy; 5 September 1940 – 18 October 1941	Succeeded by Shimada Shigetarō
Military offices
Vacant; post last held by Inagaki Ayao	Naval War College; Headmaster; 10 October 1942 - 15 November 1943	Vacant; post last held by Yoshida Zengo
Fleet Created	Escort Fleet; Commander-in-chief; 15 November 1943 - 2 August 1944	Succeeded by Nomura Naokuni
Preceded by Shimada Shigetarō	Navy General Staff; Chairman; 2 August 1944 – 29 May 1945	Succeeded by Toyoda Soemu
