= Theodor von Lerch =

Austrian military officer and ski pioneer (1869 – 1945)

Major General Theodor Edler von Lerch
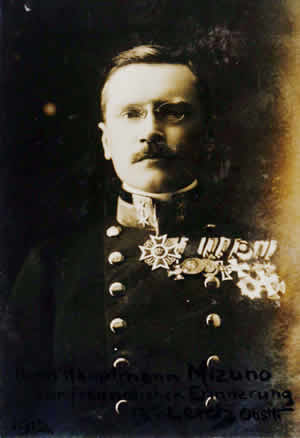
- Born: August 31, 1869; Pressburg, Austria-Hungary
- Died: December 24, 1945 (aged 76); Vienna, State of Austria
- Burial place: Vienna Central Cemetery
- Military career
- Allegiance: Austria-Hungary
- Branch: Austro-Hungarian Army
- Service years: 1891-1919
- Rank: Generalmajor
- Conflicts: World War I
- Other work: lecturer

Theodor von Lerch (August 31, 1869 – December 24, 1945) was a major general in the Austro-Hungarian Army, and a pioneer alpine ski instructor in Japan. He could speak at least seven languages: German, Czech, Magyar, and Italian (used within the Austro-Hungarian Empire), French, English, and Russian, and over the course of his career travelled across Europe and to Turkey, Japan, Korea, China and India. He enjoyed painting, and four dozen watercolors of Austrian mountains and townscapes he painted reside in Jōetsu, Japan.

== Military career ==
Von Lerch graduated from the Theresian Military Academy then in 1891 served the Austro-Hungarian Infantry in Prague and Cattaro. In 1895 he completed the general staff officer training course at the k.u.k. War College and was assigned as staff officer for the infantry, stationed successively in Chernowitz, Lemberg, Marosvászárhely, Innsbruck and Vienna. He attended ski lessons by Mathias Zdarsky starting in 1902. In February 1908 Major Lerch served as a ski instructor at the Austrian military ski courses at the Böckstein mountains in Tyrol. He visited the Japanese Pavilion at the 1908 World Art Exhibition in Dresden, which initiated an interest in Japan and later a two-year visit to that country. When Lieutenant Colonel Lerch returned from his Far East assignment, he took up command roles in Tyrolean Kaiserjäger of Mezzolombardo, Infantry Regiment in Scutari. He was Chief of Staff of 17th Corps as the First World War began, with deployments in Galicia and Isonzo, then Mountain Brigade and Infantry Brigades in Albania. In 1918 he was promoted to major general, and assigned to roles in the Carpathian Mountains, Brest-Litovsk, Isonzo and Flanders. Injuries forced him to retire in 1919.

== In Japan ==
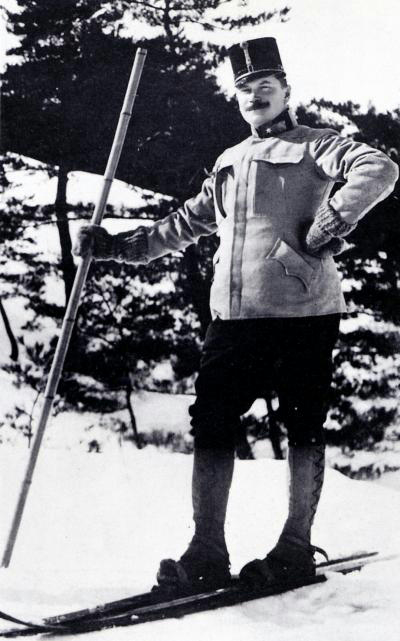
Major Theodor von Lerch in Japan

Major Lerch was assigned from 1910 - 1912 to the Far East as military training observer, visiting sites of the Russo-Japanese War. On September 26, 1910, Lerch traveled to the 13th Division of the Imperial Japanese Army as part of an exchange of officers, and assigned to the 58th Infantry Regiment in Takada. Gaishi Nagaoka invited him to introduce the sport of snow skiing to Japan. On January 12, 1911, Lerch began conducting ski lessons on Mount Kanaya. Lerch's first Japanese training group consisted of the regiment officers, including the regiment commander. Ski lessons were also provided to civilians. Lerch taught the “Lilienfelder” method of Zdarsky, using a single bamboo pole both as a rudder and as a brake. In 1911, he made the first ski ascent (partial) of Mount Fuji, with Egon von Kratzer. In 1912 now Lieutenant Colonel Lerch was assigned to the 7th Artillery Regiment in Hokkaido, and provided ski lessons and skied Mount Yotei.

He then traveled from Japan to Seoul, Mukden and Port Arthur, and then the Republic of China: Manchuria, Beijing, Shanghai, and then to British Hong Kong. At the conclusion of his Asian tour Lerch traveled to British India in order to observe military maneuvers there in November 1912.

== Honors and legacy ==
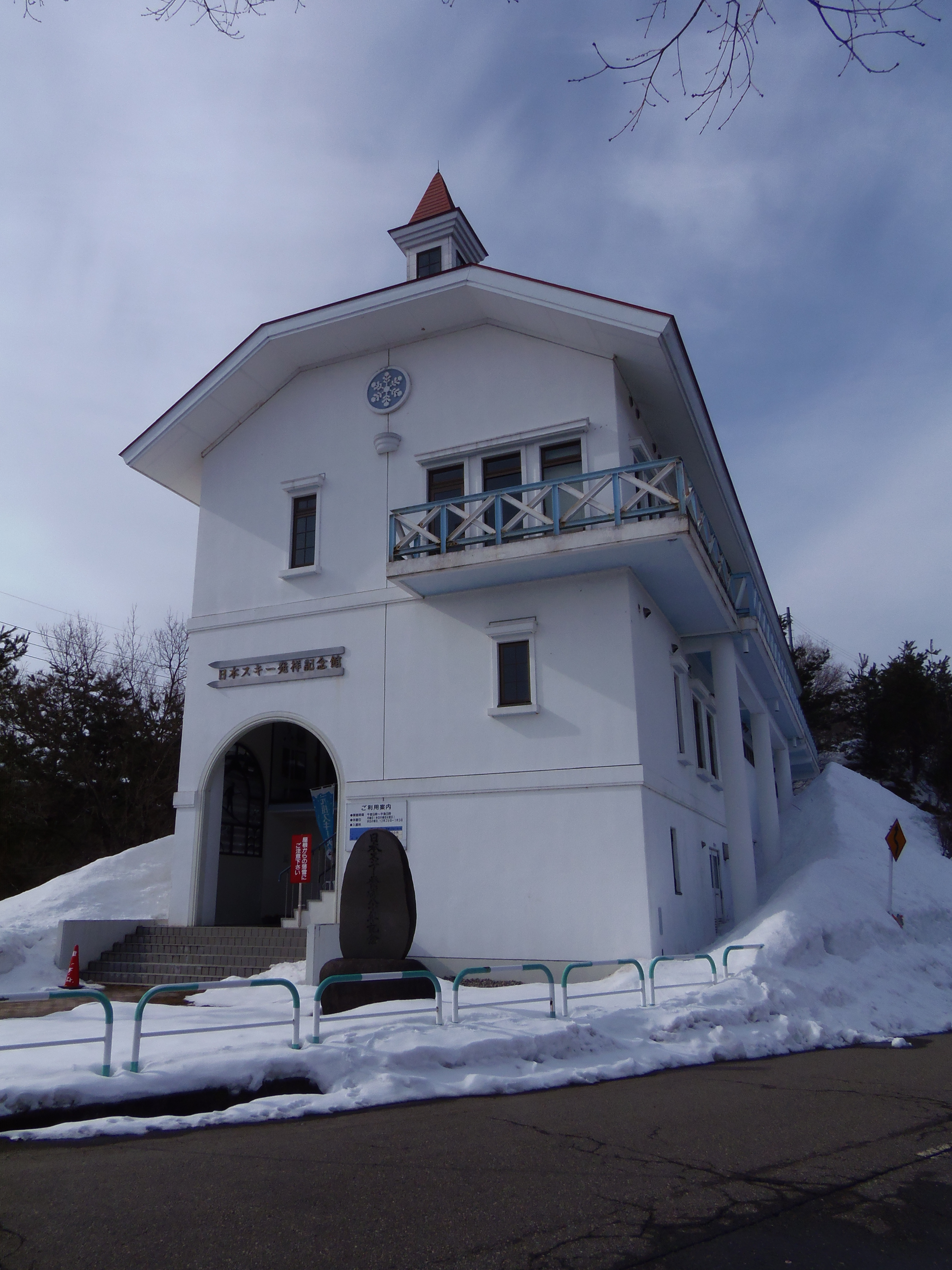
Japan Ski Birthplace Memorial Museum

He was awarded Order of the Rising Sun, 4th class by Japan. A 1961 statue and a 1992 museum which tell his story are located in the city of Jōetsu, where the Lerch-Festival is held every February. His caricature was used as a 2009 mascot for Niigata Prefecture, Japan. Lerch also has a statue at Kutchan, Hokkaido, a monument at the Asahikawa Airport and an exhibit at the Hokuchin Memorial Museum.
