= Soemu Toyoda =

Japanese admiral (1885–1957)

- 豊田 副武
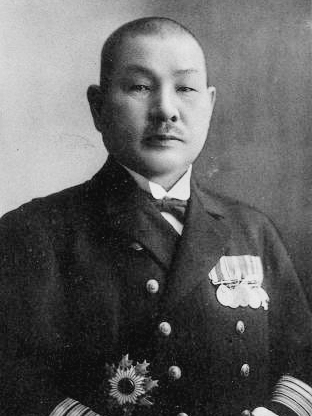

Chief of the Imperial Japanese Navy General Staff
- In office 29 May 1945 – 15 October 1945
- Prime Minister: Kantarō Suzuki; Prince Naruhiko Higashikuni
- Preceded by: Koshirō Oikawa
- Succeeded by: None (office abolished)

Personal details
- Born: May 22, 1885 Kitsuki, Ōita, Japan
- Died: September 22, 1957 (aged 72) Tokyo, Japan
- Awards: Order of the Sacred Treasures (1st class)

Military service
- Allegiance: Empire of Japan
- Branch/service: Imperial Japanese Navy
- Years of service: 1905–1945
- Rank: Admiral
- Commands: Yura, 7th Submarine Division, Hyūga, Weapons and Mobilization Bureau, Naval Communications Bureau, Naval Education Bureau, Naval Affairs Bureau, 4th Fleet, 2nd Fleet, Naval Construction Bureau, Kure Naval District, Naval Councillor, Yokosuka Naval District, Combined Fleet, Maritime Escort Fleet, Chief of Navy General Staff
- Battles/wars: World War II; Pacific War

Soemu Toyoda (豊田 副武, Toyoda Soemu; 22 May 1885 – 22 September 1957) was an admiral in the Imperial Japanese Navy in World War II.

== Biography ==
=== Early career ===
Toyoda was born in what is now part Kitsuki city, Ōita Prefecture. He graduated from the 33rd class of the Imperial Japanese Navy Academy in 1905, ranked 26th out of 176 cadets. He served his midshipman duty aboard the cruisers Hashidate and Nisshin, and after being commissioned as an ensign on 20 December 1906, he was assigned to the destroyer Asatsuyu. He was promoted to sub-lieutenant on 25 September 1908.

Toyoda returned to school, becoming a torpedo and naval artillery expert. As a lieutenant from 1 December 1911, he served on the battlecruiser Kurama. He graduated from the Naval War College (Japan) with honors in 1915, and was promoted to lieutenant commander on 1 April 1917. From 1917 to 1919, he was aide-de-camp to Admiral Motaro Yoshimatsu (ja:吉松茂太郎). From 1919 to 1922, he was sent as naval attaché to the United Kingdom, during which time he was promoted to commander on 1 December 1921.

After his return to Japan, Toyoda was assigned as executive officer on the cruiser Kuma. He subsequently served in a number of staff positions, was promoted to captain on 1 December 1925, and received his first command: the cruiser Yura in 1926. In December 1930, he became captain of the battleship Hyūga. During the London Naval Conference, he accompanied Admiral Isoroku Yamamoto to London in 1931. On 1 December 1931, Toyoda was promoted to rear admiral.

From December 1931 to February 1933, Toyoda was chief of the Second Section of the Imperial Japanese Navy General Staff, and promoted to vice admiral on 15 November 1935.

From 1935 to 1937, Toyoda was Director of the Bureau of Naval Affairs, and on 20 October 1937, became Commander-in-Chief of the IJN 4th Fleet. He subsequently became Commander in Chief of the IJN 2nd Fleet on 15 November 1938. Both fleets were active in the Second Sino-Japanese War in support of the invasion of China. From 1939 to 1941, he was Director of Naval Shipbuilding Command.

=== World War II ===
Promoted to full admiral on 18 September 1941, at the time of the attack on Pearl Harbor, Toyoda was Commander-in-Chief of the Kure Naval District. Toyoda was strongly opposed to the war with the United States, which he viewed from the start as "unwinnable".

On 10 November 1942, Toyoda became a member of the Supreme War Council, where he made a strong (but mostly unsuccessful) effort to increase funding and the capacity of Japan's industry toward naval aviation, over the opposition to the Army-dominated Imperial General Headquarters. On 21 April 1943, Toyoda was reassigned (i.e. demoted) from the Supreme War Council to command of Yokosuka Naval District.

After the death of Admiral Mineichi Koga, Toyoda was appointed Commander-in-Chief of the Combined Fleet on 3 May 1944. In June of the same year, he drafted and implemented "Plan A-Go" which resulted in the decisive defeat of the Imperial Japanese Navy under the command of Admiral Jisaburō Ozawa in the Battle of the Philippine Sea. He followed with "Plan Sho-Go", which again resulted in another major defeat at the Battle of Leyte Gulf. Toyoda was aware that both strategies had significant risks, but because the fleet of the Imperial Japanese Navy was nearing the point of being unusable due to a lack of gasoline and other essential supplies, he believed that the possibility of profit outweighed the danger of losing the fleet. In the end, however, Toyoda's aggressive defensive strategy did not pay off. Nonetheless, Toyoda continued with the same strategy, approving "Plan Ten-Go" to send the battleship Yamato on its one-way final mission to Okinawa.

Toyoda replaced Koshirō Oikawa as Chief of the Navy General Staff, after the latter resigned, and was the final supreme commander of the Imperial Japanese Navy from 29 May 1945 onward.

Toyoda participated in numerous Imperial Conferences concerning the surrender of Japan. Initially, the Navy Minister, Mitsumasa Yonai, hoped that Toyoda would be able to exert a moderating influence over Army Chief of Staff Yoshijirō Umezu (since both came from the same district of Japan). However, Toyoda joined Umezu in his protestations against the Potsdam Proclamation of 26 July. Toyoda was for termination of the war but insisted that the government push for more favorable terms. After the atomic bombing of Hiroshima and Nagasaki, Toyoda's position became even more hardline. He argued that the Japanese people should defend the Japanese home islands to the death.

=== Post-war ===
After the war, Toyoda was interrogated by Rear Admiral Ralph A. Ofstie in Tokyo on 14 November 1945. He was viewed as "highly intelligent and widely informed", and was observed to be a strong critic of the amount of political power the Army held in the Japanese government. He also expressed his opinion that the war with China should have been ended "even at some sacrifice" so that the men and resources could be redeployed to the Pacific theater.

Toyoda was subsequently arrested by SCAP occupation authorities and held in Sugamo Prison. In 1948, Toyoda was charged with war crimes "for violating the laws and customs of war". He pleaded 'not guilty' to all of the charges. He was acquitted and later released in 1949.

Toyoda published his memoirs in 1950, and died in 1957 of a heart attack at the age of 72.

Military offices
Preceded by Komaki Wasuke	Yura; Commanding Officer; 1 November 1926 – 15 November 1927	Succeeded by Ikeda Takayoshi
Preceded by Ban Jirō	Hyūga; Commanding Officer; 1 December 1930 – 1 December 1931	Succeeded by Hibino Masaharu
Preceded by Yoshida Zengo	Combined Fleet & 1st Fleet; Chief-of-staff; 15 September 1933 – 15 March 1935	Succeeded by Kondō Nobutake
Fleet recreated, post last held by Dewa Shigetō	4th Fleet; Commander-in-chief; 20 October 1937 – 15 November 1938	Succeeded by Hibino Masaharu
Preceded by Shimada Shigetarō	2nd Fleet; Commander-in-chief; 15 November 1938 – 21 October 1939	Succeeded by Koga Mineichi
Preceded by Hibino Masaharu	Kure Naval District; Commander-in-chief; 18 September 1941 – 10 November 1942	Succeeded by Takahashi Ibō
Preceded by (acting Commander-in-Chief); Mikawa Gunichi; Commander-in-Chief; Koga Mineichi	Yokosuka Naval District; Commander-in-chief; 21 May 1943 – 3 May 1944	Succeeded by Yoshida Zengo
Preceded by Koga Mineichi	Combined Fleet; Commander-in-chief; 3 May 1944 – 29 May 1945	Succeeded by Ozawa Jisaburō
Preceded by Oikawa Koshirō	Navy General Staff; Chairman; 29 May 1945 – 15 October 1945	Position abolished
