= Japanese destroyer Murakumo (1898) =

Murakumo-class destroyer

History

Empire of Japan
- Name: Murakumo
- Namesake: 叢雲 ("Gathering Clouds")
- Ordered: 1896
- Builder: John I. Thornycroft & Company, Chiswick, England
- Yard number: Torpedo Boat Destroyer No. 4
- Laid down: 1 October 1897
- Launched: 16 November 1898
- Completed: 29 December 1898
- Commissioned: 29 December 1898
- Reclassified: From torpedo boat destroyer to destroyer) 22 June 1900; Third-class destroyer 28 August 1912
- Identification: GQKB
- Stricken: 1 April 1919
- Renamed: Murakumo Maru 1 April 1919
- Reclassified: Miscellaneous vessel (submarine tender/minesweeper) 1 April 1919
- Renamed: Murakumo 1 July 1920
- Reclassified: Special-duty vessel (second-class minesweeper) 1 July 1920
- Reclassified: Utility vessel (target ship) 1 April 1922
- Fate: Sunk as target 4 June 1925

General characteristics
- Type: Murakumo-class destroyer
- Displacement: 275 long tons (279 t) normal; 360.5 long tons (366.3 t) full load
- Length: 208 ft (63 m) waterline, 210 ft (64 m) overall
- Beam: 19 ft 6 in (5.94 m)
- Draught: 6 ft 10 in (2.08 m)
- Depth: 13 ft 6 in (4.11 m)
- Propulsion: Reciprocating engine, 3 boilers, 5,800 ihp (4,300 kW), 2 shafts
- Speed: 30 knots (56 km/h; 35 mph)
- Complement: 50
- Armament: 1 × QF 12-pounder gun; 5 × QF 6 pounder Hotchkiss guns; 2 × 450 mm (18 in) torpedoes

Service record
- Operations: Boxer Rebellion; Russo-Japanese War; Battle of Port Arthur; Battle of the Yellow Sea; Battle of Tsushima; Invasion of Sakhalin; World War I; Siege of Tsingtao

Murakumo (叢雲, "Gathering Clouds") was the lead ship of six Murakumo-class destroyers, built for the Imperial Japanese Navy in the late 1890s. Murakumo took part in the Japanese response to the Boxer Rebellion (1900), saw action in several major engagements during the Russo-Japanese War (1904–1905), and served during World War I (1914–1918).

== Construction and commissioning ==
Authorized under the 1896 naval program, Murakumo was laid down on 1 October 1897 by John I. Thornycroft & Company at Chiswick, England, as Torpedo Boat Destroyer No. 4. On 16 March 1898, she was named Murakumo. When the Imperial Japanese Navy established its Naval Warship and Torpedo Boat Classification Standards on 21 March 1898, she was classified as a torpedo boat destroyer. Launched on 16 November 1898, she was completed on 29 December 1898 and commissioned the same day.

== Service history ==
Murakumo completed her delivery voyage from England to Japan on 23 April 1899 with her arrival at Yokosuka. On 30 April 1900 she participated in a large naval review held off Kobe, Japan, where she was placed in the fourth row. On 22 June 1900, the Imperial Japanese Navy established its Naval Vessel Classification Standard, abolishing the classification of "torpedo boat destroyer" and establishing the classification of "destroyer" as a type of warship, and under the new classification scheme Murakumo was classified as a destroyer. Also as of 22 June 1900, she was assigned to the Sasebo Naval District and incorporated into the Standing Fleet. During 1900, she took part in the Japanese intervention in the Boxer Rebellion in China. On 10 April 1903, she participated in a large naval review held off Kobe and was placed in the third row.

When the Russo-Japanese War broke out in February 1904, Murakumo was part of the 5th Destroyer Division of the 2nd Fleet. During the war, she took part in the Battle of Port Arthur in February 1904, the Battle of the Yellow Sea in August 1904, and the Battle of Tsushima in May 1905. During the Battle of Tsushima, Murakumo could not get into position for a torpedo attack against the Russian fleet during the night of 27–28 May 1905, but while steaming to a rendezvous on the morning of 28 May she came across the Japanese protected cruisers Niitaka and Otowa as they pursued the damaged Imperial Russian Navy protected cruiser Svetlana, which was attempting to escape northward under escort by the destroyer Buistri after the fleet action of the previous day. Keeping ahead of the Japanese cruisers, Murakumo kept Buistri from interfering with them until Svetlana ceased fire and went dead in the water after suffering additional damage. While Otowa finished off Svetlana, Buistri fled with Murakumo and Niitaka in hot pursuit. The chase culminated late in the morning in Buistri′s crew running her aground on the coast of the Korean Peninsula, partially blowing her up, and then surrendering to local authorities. Murakumo also took part in the Japanese invasion of Sakhalin in July 1905. After the war, she participated in a triumphant naval review held off Yokohama, Japan, on 23 October 1905 and was placed in the fourth row.

On 18 November 1908, Murakumo participated as a ship in the sixth row of a large-scale naval review off Kobe. On 28 August 1912, the Imperial Japanese Navy revised its ship classification standards. It established three categories of destroyers, with those of 1,000 displacement tons or more defined as first-class destroyers, those of 600 to 999 displacement tons as second-class destroyers, and those of 599 or fewer displacement tons as third-class destroyers. Under this classification scheme, Murakumo became a third-class destroyer.

After Japan entered World War I in August 1914, Murakumo operated off Tsingtao, China, in support of the Siege of Tsingtao. Later that year, she took part in the Japanese seizure of the German Empire′s colonial possessions in the Caroline, Mariana, and Marshall Islands.

Murakumo was stricken from the navy list on 1 April 1919, designated as a "miscellaneous vessel" for use as a submarine tender and minesweeper, and renamed Murakumo Maru. On 1 July 1920, she was reclassified as a "special duty vessel" for use as a second-class minesweeper and renamed Murakumo. On 1 April 1922, she was reclassified as a "utility vessel" for use as a target ship. An inspection conducted on 30 January 1925 revealed that her hull and other parts of the ship had deteriorated. On 4 June 1925, she was sunk as a live-fire target in the Pacific Ocean off the Sunosaki Lighthouse in Chiba Prefecture.

== Commanding officers ==
- Lieutenant Commander Shushiro Fujimoto 29 March 1898 (pre-commissioning)
- Lieutenant Commander Shuzo Matsuoka, 22 June 1900 – 11 September 1904
- Lieutenant Kanta Shimauchi, 11 September 1904 – 12 December 1905
- Lieutenant Commander Kanta Shimanouchi, 12 December 12, 1905 – 8 February 1906
- Lieutenant Koichi Masuda: 8 February 1906 – 10 May 1906
- Commander Kiyoshi Tsukiyama, 10 May 1906 – 4 October 1906
- Lieutenant Commander Tsuruhiko Horie, 4 October 1906 – 17 May 1907
- Lieutenant Noda Tameyoshi, 17 May 1907 – 16 May 1908
- Lieutenant Eijiro Tanabe, 16 May 1908 – 28 May 1908
- Lieutenant Captain Naonobu Hirata, 28 May 1908 – 25 September 1908
- Lieutenant Yoshikazu Maekawa, 25 September 1908 – 11 March 1909
- Lieutenant Kotaro Fujita, 11 March 1909 – 23 May 1911
- Lieutenant Keiji Yamazaki, 23 May 1911 – 20 December 1912
- Lieutenant Commander Sohei Horiuchi, 20 December 1912 – 29 May 1914
- Lieutenant Commander Kazuo Kawakita, 29 May 1914 – unknown
- Lieutenant Commander Shuzo Adachi: unknown – 13 December 1915
- Lieutenant Commander Kunitaro Kamimoto, 13 December 1915 – 12 September 1916
- Lieutenant Noboru Wakayama, 12 September 1916 – 1 December 1916
- Lieutenant Shuji Ehara, 1 December 1916 – 10 September 1918
- Lieutenant Genzo Honda, 10 September 1918 – unknown
