= Russian destroyer Gromki =

Gromki is the name of the following ships of the Imperial Russian Navy:

- Russian destroyer Gromki (1904), a Groznyi-class destroyer sunk 28 May 1905 in the Battle of Tsushima
- Russian destroyer Gromki (1913), a Derzky-class destroyer that served during World War I, scuttled in 1918

== See also ==
- Gromki (disambiguation)
- Russian corvette Gromkiy
- Soviet destroyer Gromky
- Soviet frigate Gromkiy
