= Asahi Shinkin Bank =

Bank in Japan

Asahi Shinkin Bank 朝日信用金庫
- Industry: Financial services
- Founded: 3 August 1923
- Headquarters: Tokyo, Japan
- Area served: Tokyo; Saitama; Chiba
- Services: Banking
- Number of employees: 1,530 (as of 31 March 2015)
- Website: www.asahi-shinkin.co.jp

Asahi Shinkin Bank (朝日信用金庫, Asahi Shinyō Kinko) is a bank founded in 1923 and based in Tokyo, Japan. It was established on 3 August 1923. As of 31 March 2015, the bank has 164 branches in Tokyo, Saitama, and Chiba Prefectures. The bank offers customers housing loans, car loans, and loans to finance education, as well as services to companies doing business internationally. As of 29 July 2013, the bank was planning to offer reverse mortgages to customers.

== See also ==
- List of banks
- List of banks in Japan
