= Gromki, Svetloyarsky District, Volgograd Oblast =

Gromki Громки
- Khutor
- Location within Volgograd Oblast Location within Russia
- Coordinates: 48°29′N 44°53′E
- Country: Russia
- Region: Volgograd Oblast
- District: Svetloyarsky District
- Time zone: UTC+4:00

Gromki (Russian: Громки) is a rural locality (a khutor) in Svetloyarsky District, Volgograd Oblast, Russia. The population was 47 as of 2010. There are 3 streets.

== Geography ==
Gromki is located 161 km northeast of Svetly Yar (the district's administrative centre) by road. Leshchev is the nearest rural locality.
