= Haraguchi Kensai =

Imperial Japanese Army general

Baron Haraguchi Kensai
- 原口 兼済
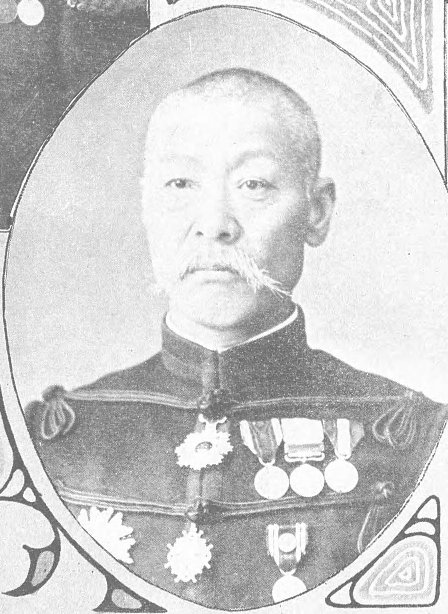
- Born: 2 April 1847; Bungo Province, Japan
- Died: 18 June 1919 (aged 72)
- Burial place: Aoyama Cemetery
- Military career
- Allegiance: Empire of Japan
- Service: Imperial Japanese Army
- Service years: 1872–1914
- Rank: Lieutenant general
- Commands: Korean Garrison Army (1904); IJA 13th Division (1905–1906)
- Conflicts: Satsuma Rebellion; First Sino-Japanese War; Russo-Japanese War; Invasion of Sakhalin

Member of the House of Peers
- In office 27 August 1910 – 9 July 1918 Elected by the Barons

Haraguchi Kensai (Japanese: 原口兼済; Chinese: 原口兼濟; Korean: 원구겸제; 2 April 1847 – 18 June 1919) was an Imperial Japanese Army (IJA) general and, in his later life, a member of the House of Peers.

== Biography ==
=== Early life ===
Haraguchi was born on 2 April 1847 to a samurai-class family in the Mori region of Bungo Province (in present-day Ōita Prefecture), located on the island of Kyushu.

=== Military career ===
In 1870, Haraguchi entered the Imperial Japanese Army Academy to train as an officer, and in 1872 received a commission as a second lieutenant or sub-lieutenant. Later in his career, from August 1890 to April 1892, he was dispatched to the German Empire to further his military education, where he served from 1890 to 1891 under Prussian general Jakob Meckel in the 2nd Infantry Regiment stationed in Mainz.

Haraguchi fought for the IJA in the Satsuma Rebellion, and later became a battalion commander, and then deputy head and, thereafter, principal of the Toyama Military School. He served as chief of staff of the IJA 4th Division at the end of the First Sino-Japanese War. He promoted to major general in 1897 and, in succession, commanded the 20th Infantry Brigade, the 1st Mixed Brigade deployed in Taiwan (see Taiwan under Japanese rule), and the 17th Infantry Brigade.

Following the Japanese occupation of Korea at the start of the Russo-Japanese War, Haraguchi commanded the newly established Korean Garrison Army from 11 March to 8 September 1904, when he was replaced by field marshal Hasegawa Yoshimichi. In July 1904, he declared martial law on key railroads and near telegraph lines in response to local unrest, writing the month prior to Minister of War Terauchi Masatake:

We try generally to be conciliatory in our policies toward the Korean people, but we have to be very severe in punishing anyone who willfully, with malign intent, sabotages the activities of the Japanese army. We have posted notices stating the punishments throughout the areas where damage to electric power lines is heaviest, between Seoul and Wŏnsan and between Seoul and Ŭiju.

— Haraguchi Kensai, "Terauchi Masatake kankei monjo" [Documents related to Terauchi Masatake], National Diet Library Kensei Shiryōshitsu [Modern Japanese Political History Collection], Tokyo, 36:4

Afterwards, he served in the Imperial General Headquarters as chief of staff of the Inspectorate General of Military Training. He received a Palgwae royal medal in 1904. In January 1905, he attained the rank of lieutenant general, and soon thereafter assumed command of the newly raised, 14,000-strong IJA 13th Division, which he led during the invasion of Sakhalin. For his successful service in the war, he was conferred the title of baron (danshaku) on 21 September 1907.

Haraguchi continued to command the IJA 13th Division until 6 July 1906, when he was relieved by Seizō Okazaki. Haraguchi transitioned to the IJA reserve forces in November 1907, and fully retired from military service in 1914.

=== Later life ===
From 1910 to 1918, Haraguchi was a member of the House of Peers. He died on 18 June 1919.
