= Gromki, Rudnyansky District, Volgograd Oblast =

Gromki Громки
- Selo
- Location within Volgograd Oblast Location within Russia
- Coordinates: 50°35′N 44°27′E
- Country: Russia
- Region: Volgograd Oblast
- District: Rudnyansky District
- Time zone: UTC+4:00

Gromki (Russian: Громки) is a rural locality (a selo) and the administrative center of Gromkovskoye Rural Settlement, Rudnyansky District, Volgograd Oblast, Russia. The population was 470 as of 2010. There are 11 streets.

== Geography ==
Gromki is located in forest steppe, 38 kilometres (24 miles) southwest of Rudnya (the district's administrative centre) by road. Stary Kondal is the nearest rural locality.
