= Hokuchin Memorial Museum =

- 北鎮記念館
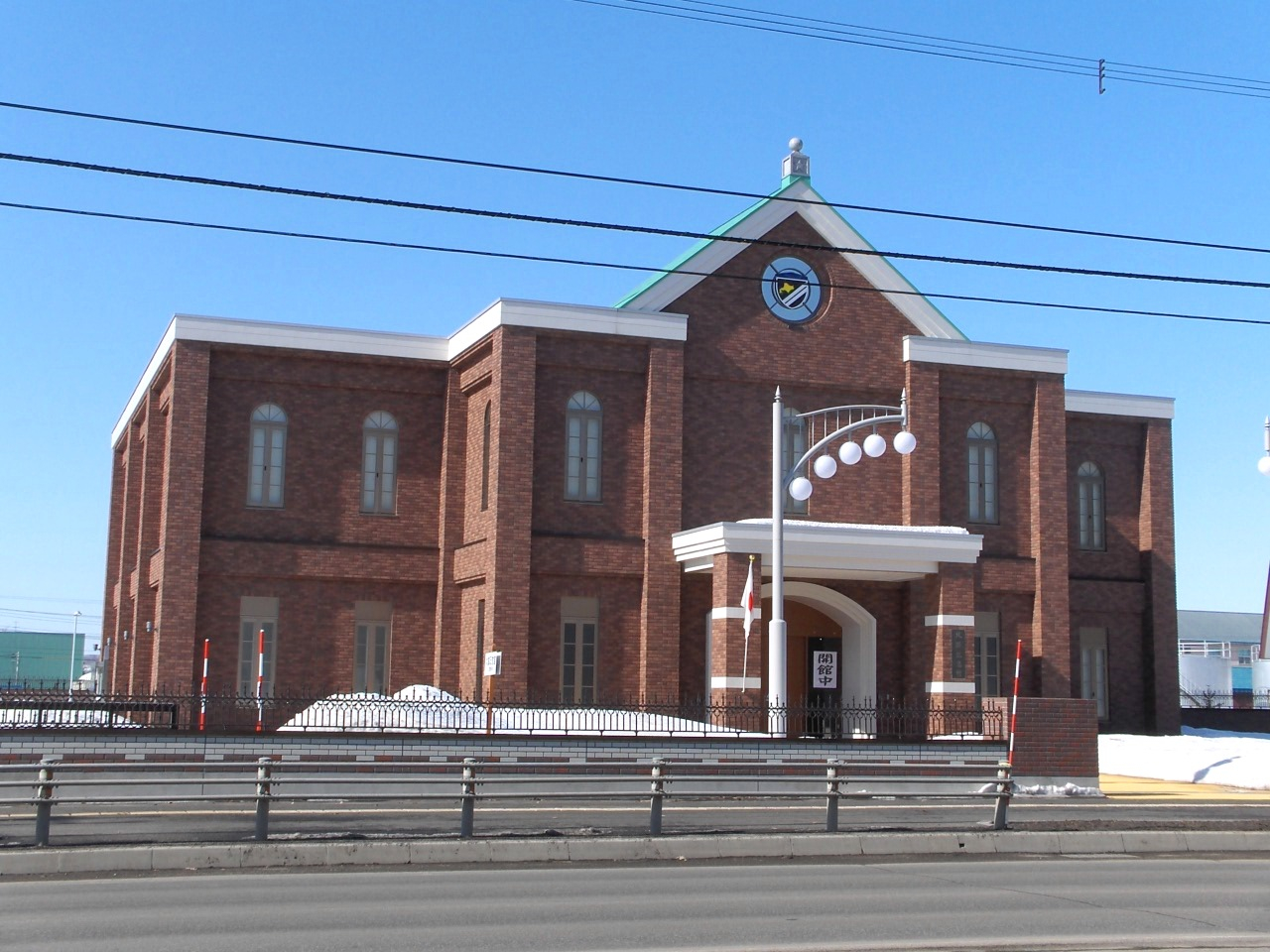
- Established: August 1963
- Location: Asahikawa, Hokkaido, Japan
- Coordinates: 43.7884°N 142.3649°E
- Type: History Museum
- Visitors: More than 200,000

Hokuchin Memorial Museum (Japanese: 北鎮記念館) is a history museum located in Asahikawa, Hokkaido, Japan. The museum is a JGSDF Public Relations facility displaying as many as 2,500 items concerning the history of the Tondenhei Army, which developed Hokkaido, the 7th Division of the old Imperial Japanese Army, and the activities of the 2nd Division of today's JGSDF. Admission is free.

== Overview ==
The museum is located adjacent to Camp Asahikawa. While facility is part of the camp, visitors can enter the museum without going through the camp gates. The size of this facility is the second largest in JGSDF, behind the JGSDF Public Relations Center located in Saitama Prefecture. Camp Asahikawa is just across the street of R-40 from Hokkaido Gokoku Jinjya Shrine.

The management and administration of the facility is carried out by Asahikawa General Service Unit. And the current curator of the museum is Captain Eisuke Moriyama.

== Exhibits ==
On the first floor, visitors can see the prospectus of the museum, description panels concerning the history of Imperial Japanese Army's 7th Division, and the booth displaying the items on the activities of JGSDF's 2nd Division.

On the second floor, the historical materials concerning Hokkaido from the time of its development to the Showa Period are exhibited.

=== Exhibitions ===
The Historiography of 7th Division
This is said to be the only existing document in Japan, because most of the classified documents were disposed at the end of Pacific War. The historiography is designated as a cultural property of Asahikawa in 2006.
Kunimi no zu (Picture of observing deployed area)
It is a painting that tells how Takeshiro Nagayama, Director of the Headquarters of Tonden Army, made up the concept of the installation of his division looking over Kamikawa Basin.
Kyokkujitsu-shou (Rising Sun Emblem)
It is a wooden replica of a bronze emblem which had been on the both ends of the Asahi bridge from its construction to the end of Pacific War.
The Will of 2LT Yutaka Yasuda
It is the will of 2LT Yutaka Yasuda, one of the officers attempted February 26 Incident.
Calligraphy of CG Naotoshi Ohsako
It is the calligraphy of Commanding General of Naotoshi Ohsako who commanded the 7th Division during the Russo‐Japanese War.
Gate Piers of the Headquarters Building of the 7th Division
They are the piers which had been constructed with the headquarters building of the 7th Division in 1902 and were moved in November 2015 to the site of this museum.

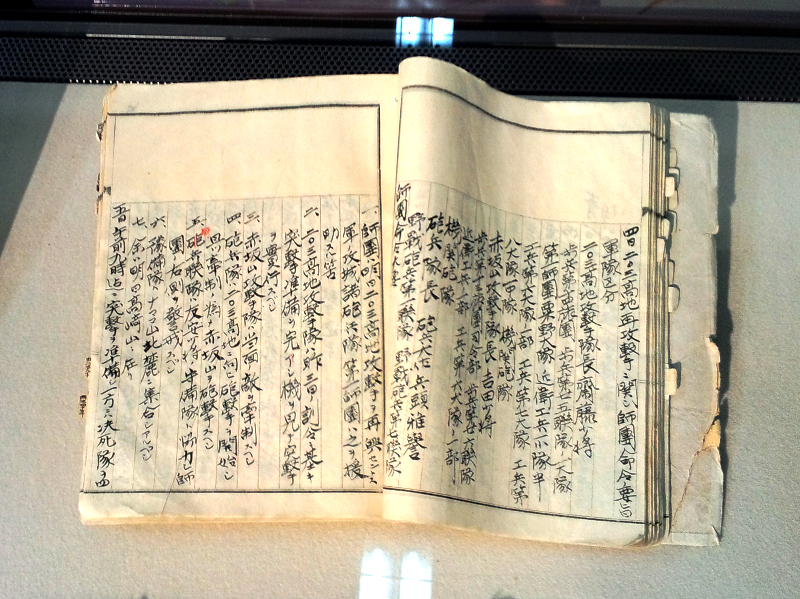
The Historiografy of 7th Division

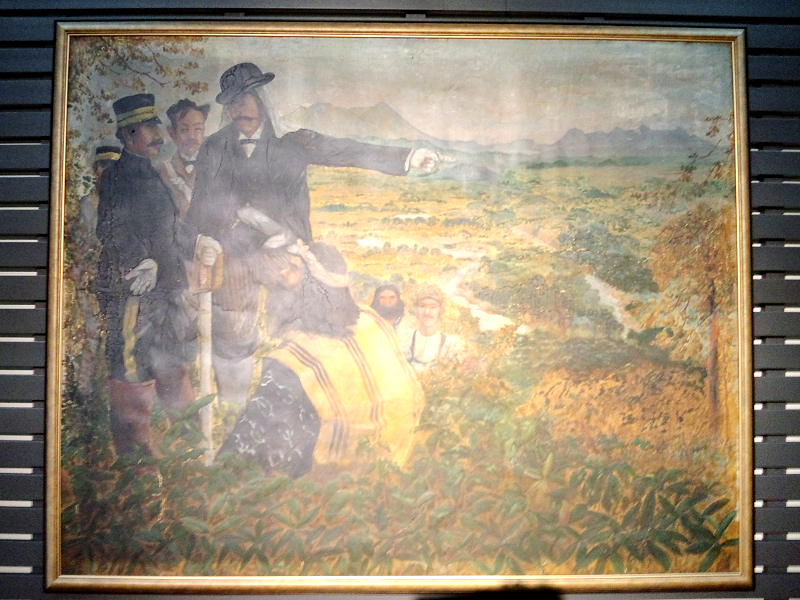
Kunimi no zu (Picture of observing deployed area)

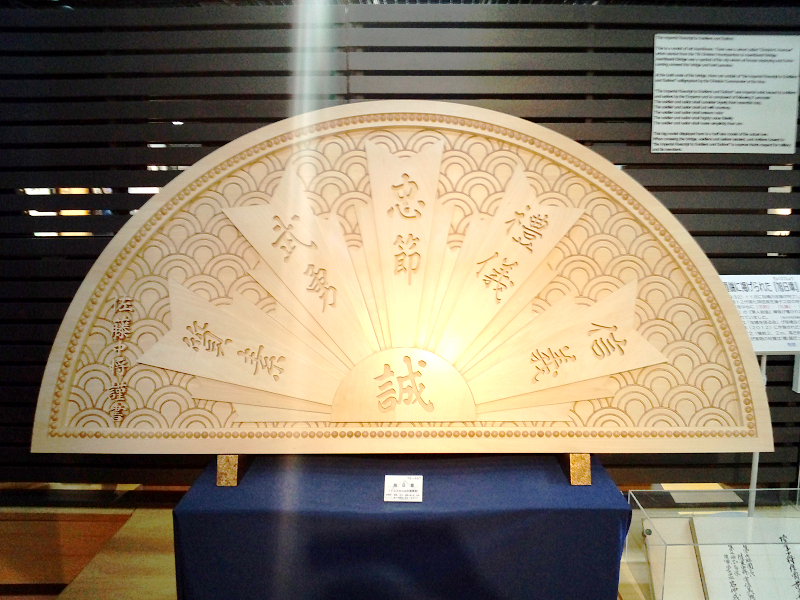
Kyokkujitsu-shou (Rising Sun Emblem)

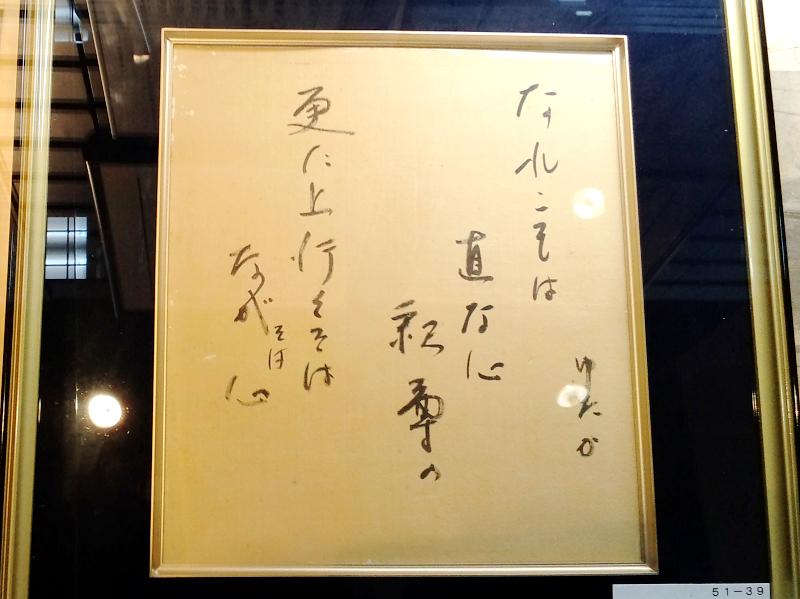
The will of 2LT Yutaka Yasuda

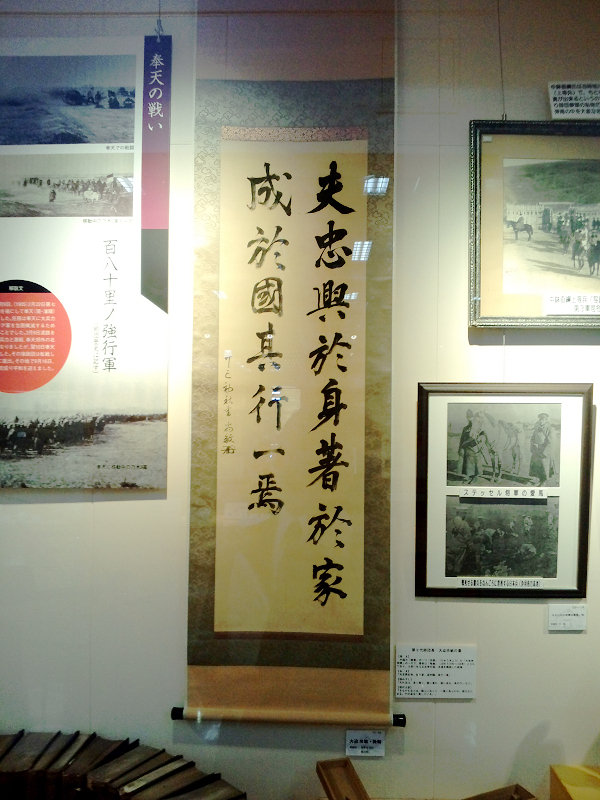
Calligraphy of CG Naotoshi Ohsako

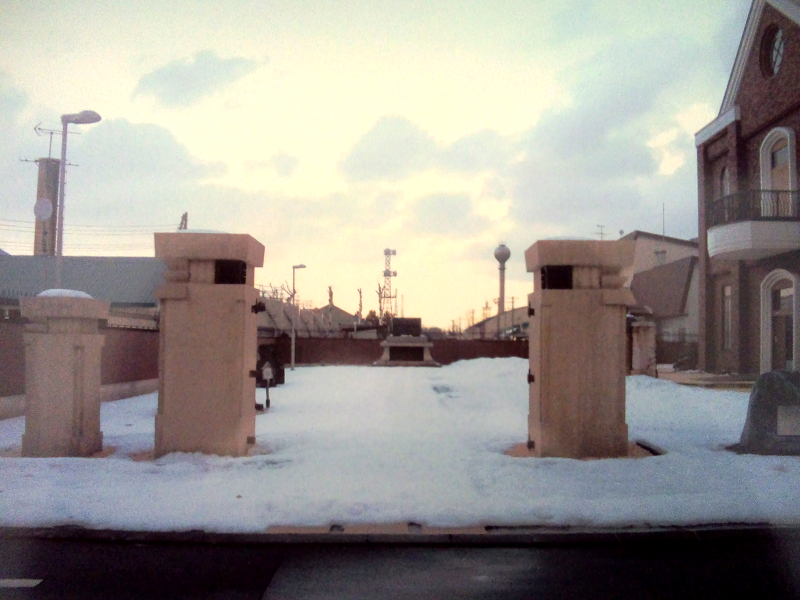
Gate Piers of the Headquarters Building of the 7th Division

== Incidental facilities ==
The souvenir shop named "Hokuchin Memorial Shop" sells Hokuchin Curry, boil-in-bag curry replicated the recipe used in the dining facilities in Camp Asahikawa, and other military goods.

== Basic information ==
- Location – Shunkocho Asahikwa, Hokkaido
- Opening Hours – Summer (April - October): 9 AM - 5 PM, Winter (November - March): 9:30 AM - 4 PM
- Closed days – Every Monday (the next day if Monday is a holiday), New Year's holiday
- Access – About 15 minutes by bus from Asahikawa station
- Parking lot – 25 regular cars, 3 large buses, 2 for disabled people
- Admission Fee – Free
