= Japanese destroyer Yūgiri (1899) =

Murakumo-class destroyer

History

Empire of Japan
- Name: Yūgiri
- Namesake: 夕霧 ("Evening Mist")
- Ordered: 1896
- Builder: John I. Thornycroft & Company, Chiswick, England
- Laid down: 1 November 1897
- Launched: 26 January 1899
- Completed: 10 March 1899
- Commissioned: 10 March 1899
- Reclassified: From torpedo boat destroyer to destroyer 22 June 1900; Third-class destroyer 28 August 1912
- Renamed: Yūgiri Maru 1 April 1919
- Reclassified: Utility vessel (submarine tender and minesweeper) 1 April 1919
- Renamed: Yūgiri 1 July 1920
- Reclassified: Special service vessel (second-class minesweeper) 1 July 1920; Utility vessel (target ship) 1 April 1922
- Decommissioned: 14 March 1924
- Stricken: 14 March 1924
- Fate: Hulked 14 March 1924

General characteristics
- Type: Murakumo-class destroyer
- Displacement: 275 long tons (279 t) normal; 360.5 long tons (366.3 t) full load
- Length: 208 ft (63 m) waterline, 210 ft (64 m) overall
- Beam: 19 ft 6 in (5.94 m)
- Draught: 6 ft 10 in (2.08 m)
- Depth: 13 ft 6 in (4.11 m)
- Propulsion: Reciprocating engine, 3 boilers, 5,800 ihp (4,300 kW), 2 shafts
- Speed: 30 knots (56 km/h; 35 mph)
- Complement: 50
- Armament: 1 × QF 12-pounder gun; 5 × QF 6 pounder Hotchkiss guns; 2 × 450 mm (18 in) torpedoes

Service record
- Operations: Russo-Japanese War; Battle of Port Arthur; Battle of the Yellow Sea; Battle of Tsushima; Invasion of Sakhalin; World War I; Siege of Tsingtao

Yūgiri (夕霧, "Evening Mist") was one of six Murakumo-class destroyers built for the Imperial Japanese Navy in the late 1890s. Yūgiri took part in several major engagements during the Russo-Japanese War (1904–1905) and served during World War I (1914–1918).

== Construction and commissioning ==
Authorized under the 1896 naval program, Yūgiri was laid down on 1 November 1897 by John I. Thornycroft & Company at Chiswick, England. Launched on 26 January 1899, she was completed on 10 March 1899 and commissioned the same day, classified as a torpedo boat destroyer.

== Service history ==
Yūgiri completed her delivery voyage from England to Japan on 15 June 1899 with her arrival at Yokosuka. She was reclassified as a destroyer on 22 June 1900.

When the Russo-Japanese War broke out in February 1904, Yūgiri was part of the 5th Destroyer Division of the 2nd Fleet. She took part in the Battle of Port Arthur in February 1904, the Battle of the Yellow Sea in August 1904, and the Battle of Tsushima in May 1905. During the Battle of Tsushima, she took part in the 5th Destroyer Division's torpedo attack against the Imperial Russian Navy squadron on the evening of 27 May 1905. After firing one torpedo, she withdrew to make another approach to fire her second torpedo, but collided with the Japanese destroyer Harusame. Harusame sustained a gash almost 3 feet (0.9 m) long below the waterline forward, but was able to continue her operations. The impact bent Yūgiri's bow to starboard, leaving her in great danger of sinking, but after an hour the crisis passed and she was able to get back underway and proceed at 3 knots (5.6 km/h; 3.5 mph) to Sasebo, Japan, which she reached on the evening of 28 May. She completed repairs and returned to service in time to participate in the invasion of Sakhalin in July 1905.

On 28 August 1912, the Imperial Japanese Navy revised its ship classification standards. It established three categories of destroyers, with those of 1,000 displacement tons or more defined as first-class destroyers, those of 600 to 999 displacement tons as second-class destroyers, and those of 599 or fewer displacement tons as third-class destroyers. Under this classification scheme, Yūgiri became a third-class destroyer.

After Japan entered World War I in August 1914, Yūgiri operated off Tsingtao, China, in support of the Siege of Tsingtao. Later that year, she took part in the Japanese seizure of the German Empire's colonial possessions in the Caroline, Mariana, and Marshall Islands.

On 1 April 1919, Yūgiri was renamed Yūgiri Maru and reclassified as a "utility vessel" for use as a submarine tender and minesweeper. On 1 July 1920 she was renamed Yūgiri and reclassified as a "special service vessel" for use as a second-class minesweeper. On 1 April 1922 she was reclassified as a "utility vessel" for use as a target ship. On 14 March 1924, she was decommissioned, stricken from the navy list, and hulked.

== Commanding officers ==
- Lieutenant Commander Shushiro Fujimoto 8 March 1898 – 29 March 1898 (pre-commissioning)
- Lieutenant Commander Ichiro Ishida 19 May 1898 – 28 October 1898 (pre-commissioning)
- Lieutenant Commander Junkichi Yajima 28 October 1898 – 6 July 1899 (pre-commissioning)
- Lieutenant Umejiro Fujimoto 22 June 1900 – 25 September 1900
- Lieutenant Commander Tomojiro Chisaka 25 September 1900 – 18 February 1903
- Lieutenant Commander Teizo Nishi 18 February 1903 – 26 September 1903
- Lieutenant Commander Sentaro Kagiwada 26 September 1903 - unknown
- Lieutenant Commander Daiji Tashiro 12 December 1905 – 20 March 1906
- Lieutenant Tsuruhiko Horie 20 March 1906 – 17 May 1907
- Lieutenant Atsumi Saito 17 May 1907 – 25 May 1909
- Lieutenant Hiroshi Hidaka 25 May 1909 – 11 March 1910
- Lieutenant Tsuneo Abe 11 March 1910 – 1 December 1910
- Lieutenant Sakae Hirayama 1 December 1910 – 15 July 1911
- Lieutenant Kohei Sekiya 15 July 1911 – 22 May 1912
- Lieutenant Sakae Hirayama 22 May 1912 – 1 December 1912
- Lieutenant Koshiro Oikawa 1 December 1912 – 1 December 1913
- Lieutenant Kazuo Tsuchida 1 December 1913 – 27 May 1914
- Lieutenant Commander Hiroshi Noguchi 27 May 1914 – 13 December 1915
- Lieutenant Shigeyoshi Masuda 13 December 1915 – 1 April 1916
- Lieutenant Matsujiro Yamada 1 April 1916 – 1 December 1916
- Lieutenant Taiji Koyama 1 December 1916 – 10 September 1918
- Lieutenant Shichisaburo Koga 10 September 1918 – 1 December 1918
- Lieutenant Shigeharu Homoto 1 December 1918 – 10 March 1919
- Lieutenant Genzo Honda 10 March 1919 – unknown
