= Nagaoka Gaishi =

Japanese military officer

Gaishi Nagaoka
- 長岡 外史
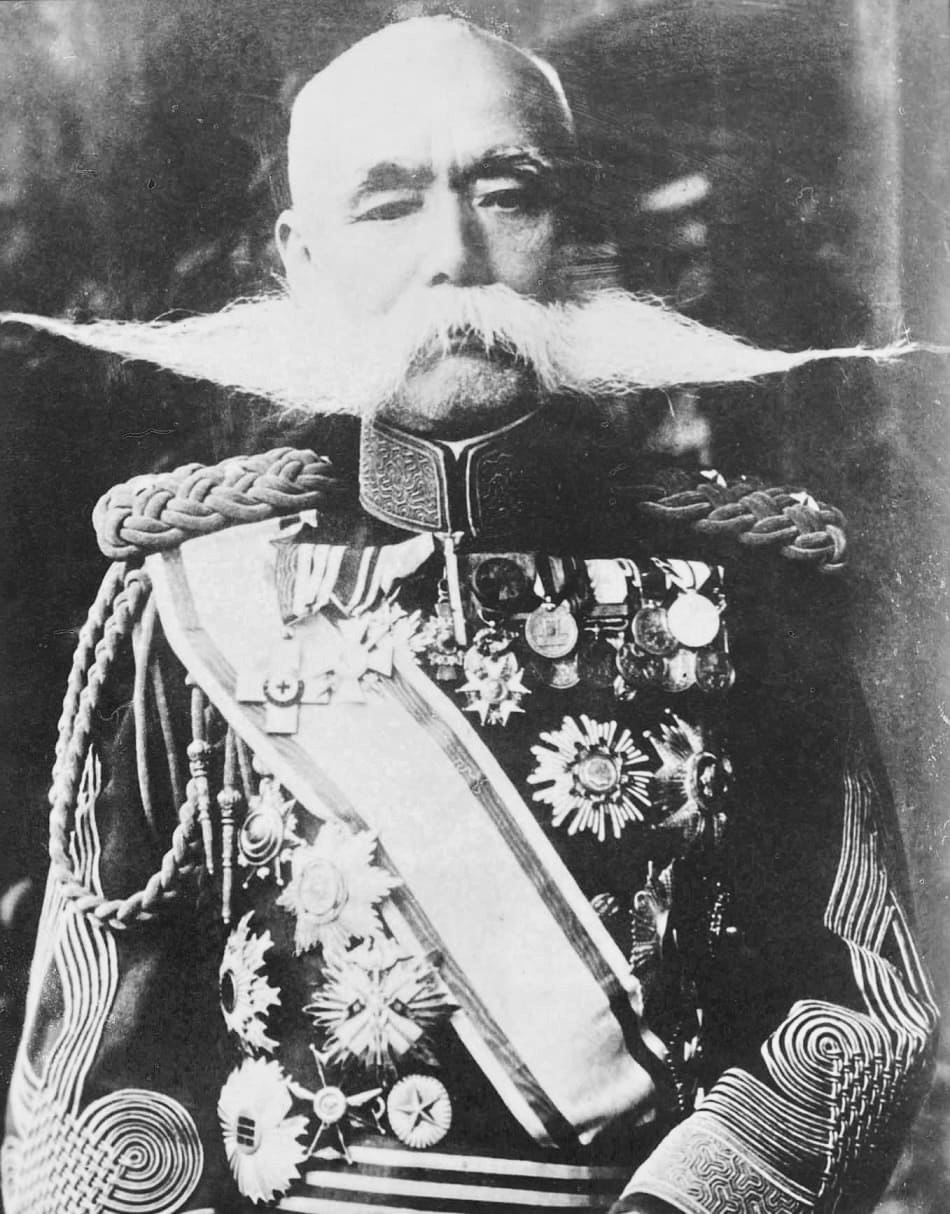
- Born: June 23, 1858; Tsuno District, Chōshū Domain, Suō Province, Japan. (Now Kudamatsu, Yamaguchi)
- Died: April 21, 1933 (aged 74); Tokyo, Japan
- Military career
- Allegiance: Empire of Japan
- Branch: Imperial Japanese Army
- Service years: 1878–1908
- Rank: Lieutenant General

Gaishi Nagaoka (長岡 外史, Nagaoka Gaishi; June 23, 1858 – April 21, 1933) was a Japanese military officer. He served in the First Sino-Japanese War and was Vice Chief of the General Staff in Japan during the Russo-Japanese War. He became a member of the House of Representatives in 1924. He was also an avid supporter of early military and civilian aviation in Japan.

== History ==
Gaishi Nagaoka was born Suō Province in 1858. His father, San'emon Hori (堀 三右衛門, Hori Sanemon), was an adopted son of Nanyō Nagaoka (長岡 南陽) who was a feudal retainer of Tokuyama Domain.

=== Military career ===
After studying at Meirinkan, he graduated from the Imperial Military Academy in 1878 and from the Army War College in 1885 as a first class student.

In the Russo-Japanese War, he won a crushing victory after the Battle of Tsushima. He also persuaded Aritomo Yamagata and the navy to carry out the successful invasion of Karafuto. As a result, this operation had a great influence on the cession of southern Sakhalin in the Treaty of Portsmouth.

He taught students from the Qing dynasty, and Chiang Kai-shek, who later became President of the Republic of China, looked up to him as his teacher.

=== Political career ===
In May 1924, he was elected to the House of Representatives in the 15th general election from the Yamaguchi 7th district.

=== Death ===
Gaishi Nagaoka Died of a bladder tumour at Keio University Hospital in 1933. He was 74 years old.

Nagaoka's grave is located in Aoyama Cemetery. His facial hair was removed by his son at his deathbed, placed in a separate casket, and buried separately. There is a statue of Nagaoka and a foreign history park honouring him in the national lodging house in Oshiro on Kasado Island, in Kudamatsu, Yamaguchi. In Kudamatsu City, there is a "Nagaoka Gaishi history Commendation Association."

== Children ==
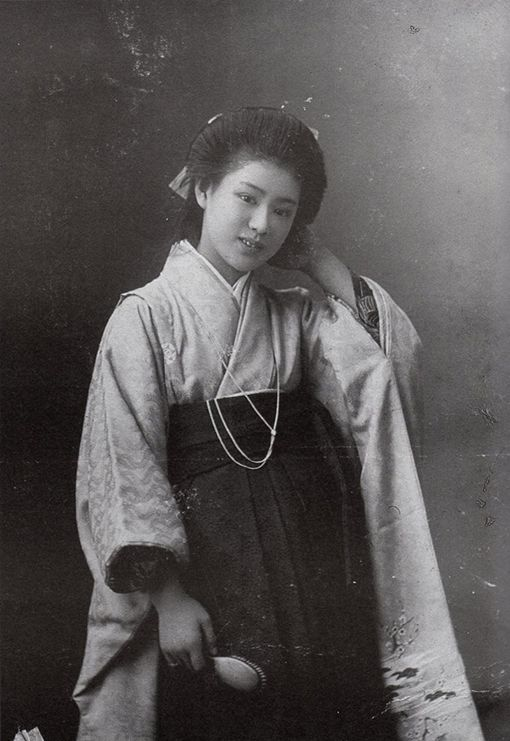
The actress Isoko Asabuki (1889-1985) was Nagaoka's eldest daughter

Nagaoka had two daughters and one son. His eldest daughter was actress and tennis player Isoko Asabuki (朝吹磯子).
