= Soviet frigate Gromkiy =

Krivak-class frigate

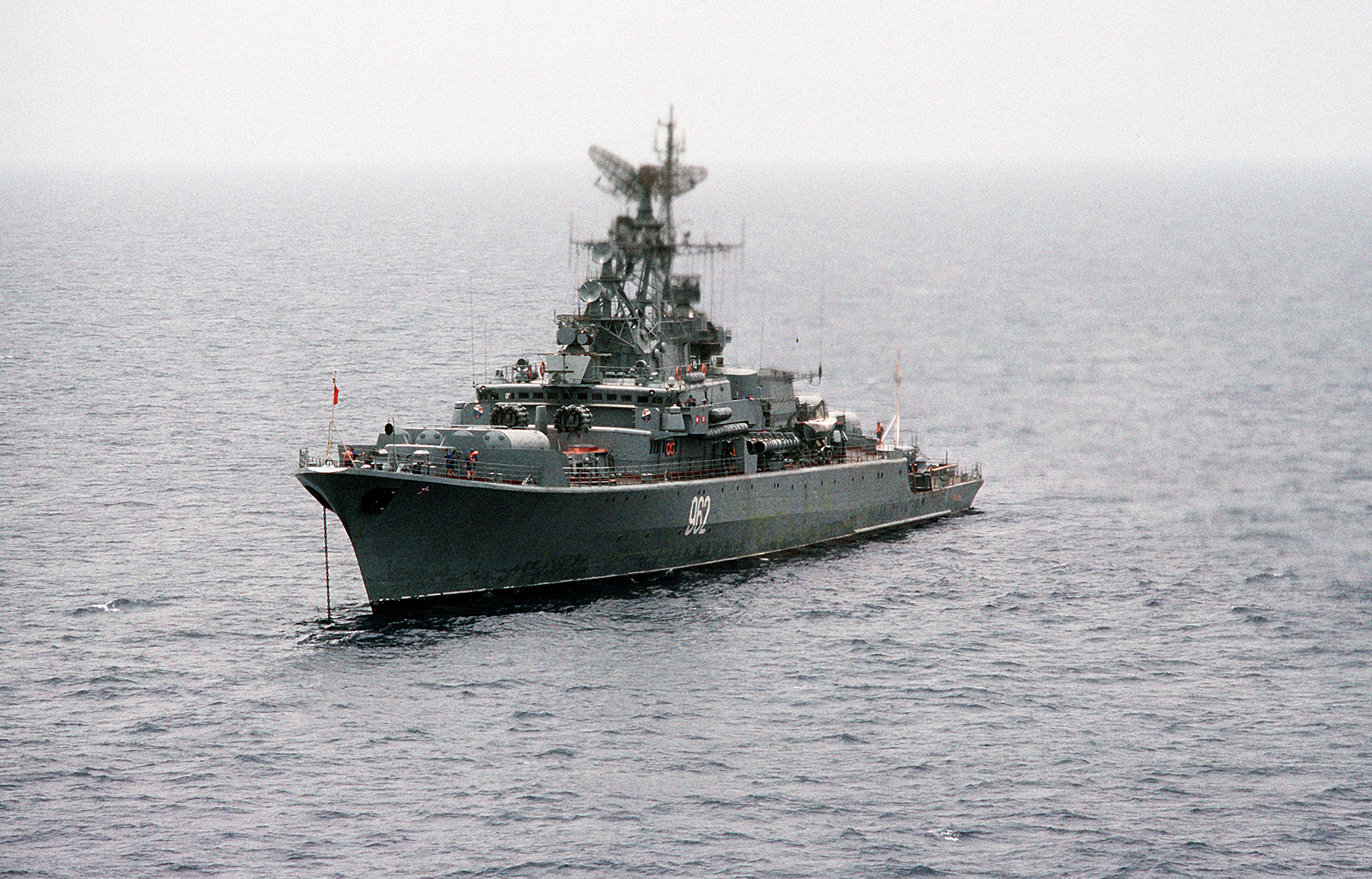
- Gromkiy at anchor on 1 June 1988.

History

Soviet Union
- Name: Gromkiy
- Namesake: Russian for Loud
- Builder: Yantar shipyard, Kaliningrad
- Yard number: 164
- Laid down: 23 June 1976
- Launched: 11 April 1978
- Commissioned: 30 September 1978
- Decommissioned: 16 March 1998
- Fate: Broken up

General characteristics
- Class & type: Project 1135M Burevestnik frigate
- Displacement: 2,935 t (2,889 long tons; 3,235 short tons) (standard); 3,305 t (3,253 long tons; 3,643 short tons) (full load)
- Length: 123 m (403 ft 7 in)
- Beam: 14.2 m (46 ft 7 in)
- Draft: 4.5 m (14 ft 9 in)
- Installed power: 44,000 shp (33,000 kW)
- Propulsion: 4 gas turbines; COGAG; 2 shafts
- Speed: 32 kn (59 km/h)
- Range: 3,900 nmi (7,223 km) at 14 kn (26 km/h)
- Complement: 23 officers, 171 ratings
- Sensors & processing systems: MR-310A Angara-A air/surface search radar; Don navigational radar; MR-143 Lev-214 fire control radar; MG-332T Titan-2T, MG-325 Vega, 2 MG-7 Braslet and MGS-400K sonars
- Electronic warfare & decoys: PK-16 decoy-dispenser system
- Armament: 1 × URPK-5 Rastrub (SS-N-14 'Silex') anti-submarine and anti-shipping missile system with 4 85RU missiles; 4 × ZIF-122 4K33 launchers (2×2) with 40 4K33 OSA-M (SA-N-4 'Gecko') surface to air missiles; 2 × 100 mm (4 in) AK-100 guns (2×1); 2 × RBU-6000 Smerch-2 anti-submarine rockets; 8 × 533 mm (21 in) torpedo tubes (2×4)

Gromkiy (Russian: Громкий, "Loud") was a Project 1135M Burevestnik-class (Russian: Буревестник, "Petrel") Guard Ship (Сторожевой Корабль, SKR) or 'Krivak II'-class frigate that served with the Soviet and Russian Navies. Launched on 11 April 1978, the vessel operated as part of the Northern Fleet as an anti-submarine vessel, with an armament built around the URPK-5 Rastrub (SS-N-14 'Silex') missile system. In 1991, the ship took part in the semicentennial commemoration of the first of the arctic convoys of the Second World War alongside the Royal Navy frigate HMS London. Soon afterwards, the ship was transferred to the Russian Navy following the dissolution of the Soviet Union. Gromkiy served for less than two years in this new role before being withdrawn for repairs and, ultimately, decommissioning on 16 March 1998.

== Design and development ==
Gromkiy was one of eleven Project 1135M ships launched between 1975 and 1981. Project 1135, the Burevestnik (Russian: Буревестник, "Petrel") class, was envisaged by the Soviet Navy as a less expensive complement to the Project 1134A Berkut A (NATO reporting name 'Kresta II') and Project 1134B Berkut B (NATO reporting name 'Kara') classes of anti-submarine ships. Project 1135M was an improvement developed in 1972 with slightly increased displacement and heavier guns compared with the basic 1135. The design, by N. P. Sobolov, combined a powerful missile armament with good seakeeping for a blue water role. The ships were designated Guard Ship (Сторожевой Корабль, SKR) to reflect their substantial greater anti-ship capability than the earlier members of the class and the Soviet strategy of creating protected areas for friendly submarines close to the coast. NATO forces called the vessels 'Krivak II'-class frigates.

Displacing 2,935 tonnes (2,889 long tons; 3,235 short tons) standard and 3,305 t (3,253 long tons; 3,643 short tons) full load, Gromkiy was 123 m (403 ft 7 in) long overall, with a beam of 14.2 m (46 ft 7 in) and a draught of 4.5 m (14 ft 9 in). Power was provided by two M7K power sets, each consisting of a combination of a 17,000-shaft-horsepower (13,000 kW) DK59 and a 5,000 shp (3,700 kW) M62 gas turbine arranged in a COGAG installation and driving one fixed-pitch propeller. Each set was capable of a maximum of 22,000 shp (16,000 kW). Design speed was 32 knots (59 km/h; 37 mph) and range 3,900 nautical miles (7,223 km; 4,488 mi) at 14 kn (26 km/h; 16 mph). The ship’s complement was 194, including 23 officers.

=== Armament and sensors ===
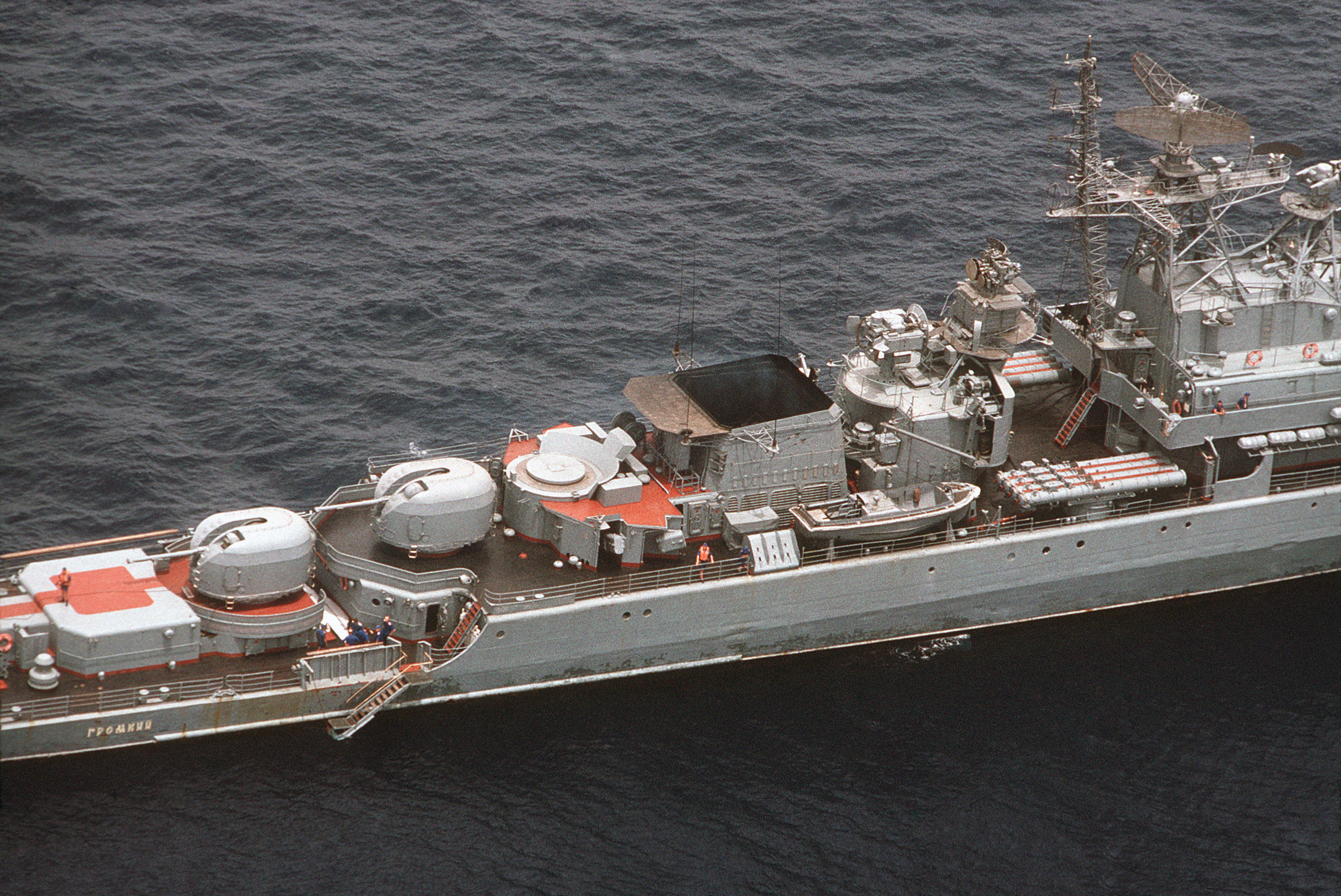
Armament and sensors on the rear sector of Gromkiy

Gromkiy was designed for anti-submarine warfare around the URPK-5 Rastrub (NATO reporting name SS-N-14 'Silex') system, backed up by a pair of quadruple launchers for 533 mm (21 in) torpedoes and a pair of RBU-6000 213 mm (8 in) Smerch-2 anti-submarine rocket launchers. The URPK-5 and the torpedoes also had anti-ship capabilities, the former through the use of four 85RU dual-purpose missiles mounted in KT-100U launchers. Defence against aircraft was provided by forty 4K33 OSA-M (SA-N-4 'Gecko') surface to air missiles which were launched from two sets of ZIF-122 launchers, each capable of launching two missiles. Two 100 mm (4 in) AK-100 guns were mounted aft.

The ship had a well-equipped sensor suite, including a single MR-310A Angara-A air/surface search radar, Don navigation radar, the MP-401S Start-S ESM radar system and the Spectrum-F laser warning system. Fire control for the guns consisted of a MR-143 Lev-214 radar. An extensive sonar complex was fitted, including MG-332T Titan-2T, which was mounted in a bow radome, and MG-325 Vega. The latter was a towed-array sonar specifically developed for the class and had a range of up to 15 kilometres (9.3 mi). The vessel was also equipped with the PK-16 decoy-dispenser system which used chaff as a form of missile defense.

== Construction and career ==
Laid down by on 23 June 1976 with the yard number 164 at the Yantar Shipyard in Kaliningrad, Gromkiy was launched on 11 April 1978. The ship was the sixth of the class built at the yard and was named for a Russian word that can be translated as loud. The vessel was commissioned on 30 September and joined the Northern Fleet at Murmansk.

On 26 August 1991, the vessel left Murmansk to lead a flotilla of ships out in commemoration of the arctic convoys of the Second World War. The Soviets rendezvoused with the Royal Navy frigate HMS London and undertook the joint exercise Dervish 91, which simulated the attacks by German forces, and then sailed to Nordkapp Municipality where commemorative activities took place. The fleet then sailed to Murmansk on 29 August and on to Arkhangelsk, arriving on 31 August, fifty years after the first British vessel arrived in the first wartime convoy, Operation Dervish. Commemorations were held involving citizens from Australia, Canada, Great Britain, New Zealand, the Soviet Union and the United States, representing the allies that were involved in the original operation. The event was nearly marred by the 1991 Soviet coup d'état attempt, which almost led to the cancellation of the exercise.

With the dissolution of the Soviet Union on 26 December 1991, Gromkiy was transferred to the Russian Navy. On 6 April 1993, the vessel arrived at Shipyard Number 35 and then on 27 December 1994, at Shipyard Number 10, to be repaired. However, lack of funding meant that instead the ship was decommissioned on 16 March 1998 and broken up at Murmansk.
