= Murakumo-class destroyer =

Class of Imperial Japanese Navy destroyers

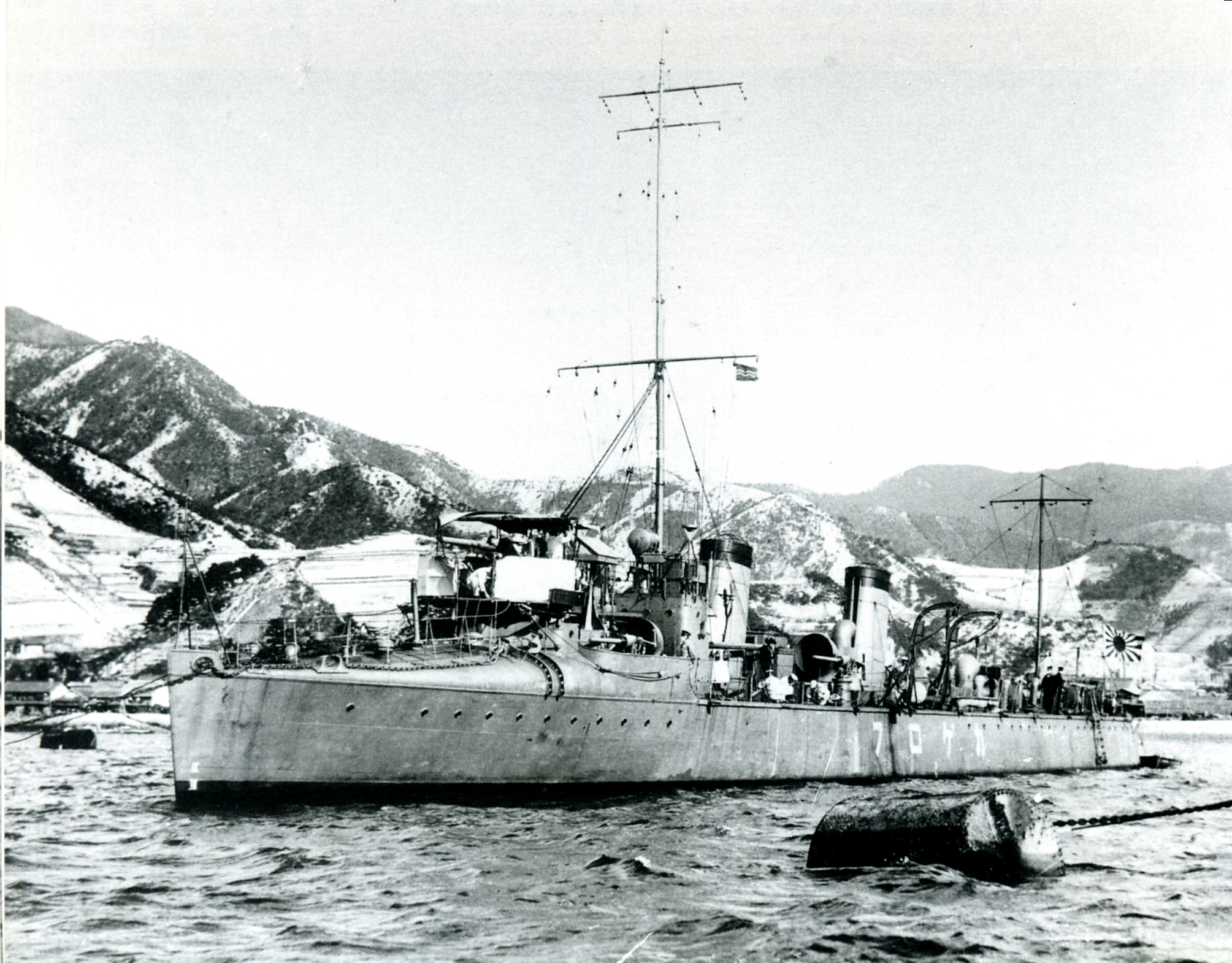
- Murakumo-class destroyer Kagerō at Kure, 1920

Class overview
- Name: Murakumo class
- Builders: John I. Thornycroft & Company Chiswick, England
- Operators: Imperial Japanese Navy
- Preceded by: Ikazuchi class
- Succeeded by: Akatsuki class
- In commission: December 1898 - June 1925
- Planned: 6
- Completed: 6
- Lost: 1
- Retired: 5

General characteristics
- Type: Destroyer
- Displacement: 275 long tons (279 t) normal; 360.5 long tons (366 t) full load
- Length: 208 ft (63 m) waterline, 210 ft (64 m) overall
- Beam: 19.5 ft (5.9 m)
- Draught: 6 ft 10 in (2.08 m)
- Depth: 13.5 ft (4.1 m)
- Propulsion: 2-shaft reciprocating, 3 boilers, 5,800 ihp (4,300 kW)
- Speed: 30 knots (56 km/h)
- Complement: 50
- Armament: 1 × QF 12-pounder gun; 5 × QF 6 pounder Hotchkiss guns; 2 × 450 mm (18 in) torpedoes

The Murakumo-class destroyers (叢雲型駆逐艦, Murakumo-gata kuchikukan) ("Gathering Clouds") were a class of six torpedo boat destroyers (TBDs) of the Imperial Japanese Navy, built in Britain in 1897–99. The class is also sometimes referred to as the Shinonome-class destroyers (東雲駆逐艦, Shinonome-gata kuchikukan)("Daybreak"). All were named after celestial phenomena.

== Background ==
In the First Sino-Japanese War, the Japanese navy came to understand the combat effectiveness of small, fast torpedo equipped warships over larger, slower ships equipped with slow-loading and often inaccurate naval artillery. The Murakumo-class vessels were the first class of destroyers to be procured by the Imperial Japanese Navy, but were purchased almost simultaneously with the Ikazuchi class, whose lead ship Ikazuchi was the first to be laid down and launched. Four ships were ordered under the 1896 fiscal year budget (Murakumo and Shinonome on 15 January 1897, and Yūgiri and Shiranui on 7 May), and an additional two under the 1897 budget (Kagerō and Usugumo on 6 May 1898). All were ordered from John I. Thornycroft & Company in Chiswick, England. The last two were slightly (7½ tons) heavier than the first four, and thus had 1½ inches greater draught.

== Design ==
The design of the Murakumo-class destroyers was based on Thorneycroft's two-stack destroyers for the Royal Navy (from 1913 known as the D class) also known as the "Thirty Knotters". In particular, they were built to the same plans as Thornycroft's Coquette, Cygnet and Cynthia, to which they were sisterships. Although slightly smaller than the Ikazuchi class, they had the same armaments.

All Murakumo-class vessels had a flush deck design with a distinctive "turtleback" forecastle that was intended to clear water from the bow during high speed navigation, but was poorly designed for high waves or bad weather. The bridge and forward gun platform were barely raised above the bow, resulting in a wet conning position. More than half of the small hull was occupied by the boilers and the engine room. With fuel and weaponry, there was little space left for crew quarters.

All were powered by triple expansion steam engines for 5,800 shaft horsepower (4,300 kW) and had coal-fired water-tube boilers. Armament was one QF 12-pounder gun on a bandstand on the forecastle, five QF 6 pounder Hotchkiss guns (two sited abreast the conning tower, two sited between the funnels and one on the quarterdeck) and 2 single tubes for 18-inch (460 mm) torpedoes.

== Operational history ==
All six Murakumo-class destroyers arrived in Japan in time to be used during the Russo-Japanese War of 1904–1905. All were present at the Battle of the Yellow Sea and the final crucial Battle of Tsushima.

The Murakumo-class vessels reclassified as third-class destroyers on 28 August 1912, and were removed from front-line combat service. Usugumo was wrecked in a typhoon in July 1913, but was salved and restored to service; Shinonome was lost when she broke in two during a typhoon off Taiwan on 23 July 1913 and not recovered.

The five surviving vessels were again used in combat with the start of World War I, during the Battle of Tsingtao and in the operations to seize German colonial possessions in the South Pacific.

After the war, Murakumo and Yūgiri were demilitarized, and used as depot ships in 1919–20, and then as auxiliary minesweepers in 1920. Shiranui and Kagerō served as tenders to the torpedo school in 1918, and were for disposal at Kure in April 1922 (broken up in 1923). Usugumo was similarly struck from the Navy List in 1922, and was broken up in 1927.

== List of ships ==
Kanji	Name Translation	Builder	Laid down	Launched	Completed	Fate
叢雲	Murakumo "Gathering Clouds"	Thornycroft, Chiswick, UK	1 October 1897	16 November 1898	29 December 1898	depot vessel 1 April 1919, auxiliary minesweeper 1 July 1920; dispatch vessel 1 April 1922, scuttled 4 June 1925
東雲	Shinonome "Dawn Cloud"	Thornycroft, Chiswick, UK	1 October 1897	14 December 1898	1 February 1899	wrecked off Taiwan 23 July 1913; written off 6 August 1913
夕霧	Yūgiri "Evening Mist"	Thornycroft, Chiswick, UK	1 November 1897	26 January 1899	10 March 1899	depot vessel 1 April 1919, auxiliary minesweeper 1 July 1920; Broken up 1 April 1922
不知火	Shiranui "Phosphorescent Foam"	Thornycroft, Chiswick, UK	1 January 1898	15 March 1899	13 May 1899	minesweeper 1 April 1922, dispatch vessel 1 August 1923; Broken up 25 February 1925
陽炎	Kagerō "Mirage"	Thornycroft, Chiswick, UK	1 August 1898	23 October 1899	31 October 1899	Dispatch vessel 21 April 1922; Broken up 25 February 1925
薄雲	Usugumo "Thin Clouds"	Thornycroft, Chiswick, UK	1 September 1898	16 January 1900	1 February 1900	minesweeper 1 April 1922, dispatch vessel 1 August 1923; scuttled 29 April 1925
