= Japanese invasion of Sakhalin =

Campaign in the Russo-Japanese war

Coordinates: 46°45′00″N 142°39′00″E

- Part of the Russo-Japanese War
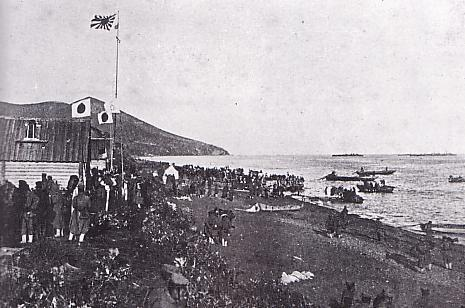
- Japanese troops landing on Sakhalin
Date	7–31 July 1905
Location	Sakhalin
Result	Japanese victory
Territorial changes	Japanese occupation of Southern Sakhalin

Belligerents
Japan	Russia

Commanders and leaders
Haraguchi Kensai; Kataoka Shichirō	Mikhail Nikolaevich Lyapunov (surrendered)

Strength
13th Division (~14,000 men)	7,280 men

Casualties and losses
Minimal	181 dead and 3,270 prisoners

The Japanese invasion of Sakhalin was the last land battle of the Russo-Japanese War, and took place from 7 July to 31 July 1905.

== Background ==
The invasion and occupation of the island of Sakhalin had been considered by the Japanese government from the early stages of the Russo-Japanese War, and the plan was actively promoted by General Nagaoka Gaishi, a senior member of the Imperial General Headquarters. However, the plan was vetoed, primarily due to opposition by the Imperial Japanese Navy.

On 7 June 1905, shortly after the Battle of Tsushima, U.S. President Theodore Roosevelt met with Japanese diplomat Kaneko Kentarō and the issue was reconsidered. Roosevelt agreed with the Japanese assessment that the invasion and occupation of Sakhalin was now necessary, as only the threat of direct loss of Russian territory would bring Tsar Nicholas II to consider a negotiated settlement to the war.

Japan and Russia had previously shared ownership of Sakhalin; however, the Japanese relinquished their claims in the 1875 Treaty of Saint Petersburg in exchange for undisputed sovereignty over all of the Kuril Islands. By 1904, Sakhalin had an estimated 30,000 inhabitants, including around 4,000 Ainu. The island was used as a prison and a place of exile for political dissidents, and did not figure prominently in Russian strategic plans. The island was noted for its harsh climate, isolation, and the high level of corruption of its ruling bureaucrats, and consequently little investment was made in its defence.

The Imperial Russian Army had a garrison on Sakhalin with a nominal strength of 7,280 men. However, many of these men were conscripted farmers, hunters, or political prisoners with minimal training or equipment. Russian General Mikhail Nikolaevich Lyapunov had been a lawyer before the war, and had limited formal military training.

The Imperial Japanese Army invasion force consisted of 14,000 men of the newly formed IJA 13th Division under General Haraguchi Kensai, supported by a naval force led by Admiral Kataoka Shichirō, consisting of four armored cruisers (under Vice Admiral Dewa Shigetō), four protected cruisers (under Rear Admiral Tōgō Masamichi), four coastal defense ships, nine destroyers and twelve torpedo boats.

== The battle ==
The town of Korsakov, as occupied by Japanese troops

The Japanese force commenced landing operations on 7 July 1905, with the main force landing between Aniva and Korsakov without opposition, and a second landing party nearer to Korsakov itself, where it destroyed a battery of field artillery after short combat. The Japanese moved on to occupy Korsakov on 8 July, which was set on fire by the retreating Russian garrison after having been defended for 17 hours by 2,000 men led by Colonel Josef Arciszewski. The Japanese moved north, taking the village of Vladimirovka (present-day Yuzhno-Sakhalinsk) on 10 July, the same day that a new Japanese detachment landed at Cape Notoro. Colonel Arciszewski dug in to resist the Japanese, but was outflanked and forced to flee into the mountainous interior of the island. He surrendered with his remaining men on 16 July. About 200 Russians were captured while the Japanese suffered 18 dead and 58 wounded.

On 24 July, the Japanese landed in northern Sakhalin near Alexandrovsk-Sakhalinski. In northern Sakhalin, the Russians had about 5,000 troops under the direct command of General Lyapunov. Because of the numerical and material superiority of the Japanese, the Russians withdrew from the city and surrendered a few days later on 31 July 1905.

== Results ==
The Japanese occupied Sakhalin with minimal effort and low losses. The Russians suffered 181 dead and had 3,270 taken prisoner. The reasons for the low Russian resistance lay in the low morale of the soldiers, who were mostly prisoners and deportees with little or no military training. Per the terms of the Treaty of Portsmouth ending the Russo-Japanese War, the southern half of Sakhalin was ceded to Japan, with the 50th parallel north as the boundary line, becoming Karafuto Prefecture.
