= List of ship launches in 1885 =

The list of ship launches in 1885 includes a chronological list of some ships launched in 1885.

Date	Ship	Class / type	Builder	Location	Country	Notes
1 January	Callao	Barque	Harland & Wolff	Belfast	United Kingdom	For White Star Line.
1 January	Lindum	Humber Keel	Richard Dunston	Thorne	United Kingdom	For Messrs. H. Newsum & Co.
2 January	Eros	Steam yacht	Messrs. Chapman & Shuttleworth	Erith	United Kingdom	For Baron A. de Rothschild.
3 January	Belgic	Cargo liner	Harland & Wolff	Belfast	United Kingdom	For White Star Line.
3 January	Harmony	Fishing boat	Mr. Geddie	Banff	United Kingdom	For Alexander Watt.
4 January	Hamidiye	Ironclad	Imperial Arsenal	Golden Horn	Ottoman Empire	For Ottoman Navy.
5 January	Ballumbie	Barque	Messrs. W. Gray & Co.	West Hartlepool	United Kingdom	For Ballumbie Shipping Co.
5 January	Marlborough Hill	Merchantman	Messrs. W. H. Potter & Son	Liverpool	United Kingdom	For W. Price.
15 January	Louisa	Fishing boat	James Mowat	Gourdon	United Kingdom	For Andrew Ritchie.
15 January	Mascotte	Steamship	Messrs. Ramage & Ferguson	Leith	United Kingdom	For Messrs. George Gibson & Co.
15 January	William Jolliffe	Tug	Messrs. John Readhead & Sons	South Shields	United Kingdom	For Thomas A. Jolliffe.
17 January	Aquidabã	Ironclad	Samuda Brothers	Cubitt Town	United Kingdom	For Imperial Brazilian Navy.
17 January	Harvest Home	Fishing boat	Messrs. Stephenson & Co.	Macduff	United Kingdom	For Messrs. F. Blair & A. Paterson.
17 January	Mount Olivet	Steamship	Palmer's Shipbuilding and Iron Company	Jarrow	United Kingdom	For Mount Line.
17 January	Primrose	Steamship	Messrs. H. M'Intyre & Co.	Merksworth	United Kingdom	For Messrs. Richard Hughes & Co.
17 January	Royal Prince	Steamship	Short Bros.	Pallion	United Kingdom	For Prince Steam Shipping Co. Ltd.
17 January	Santiago	Barque	Harland & Wolff	Belfast	United Kingdom	For White Star Line.
17 January	St. Clement	Steam trawler	Messrs. Hall, Russell & Co.	Aberdeen	United Kingdom	For Thomas Walker.
17 January	Surprise	Surprise-class cruiser	Messrs. Palmer's Shipbuilding and Iron Company	Jarrow	United Kingdom	For Royal Navy.
17 January	Yalleroi	Clipper	Messrs. Hall, Russell & Co.	Aberdeen	United Kingdom	For Messrs. Alexander Nichol & Co.
17 January	Unnamed	Fishing boat	William Young	Portsoy	United Kingdom	For George Slater.
19 January	Ardencaple	Merchantman	Messrs. A. Stephen & Son	Linthouse	United Kingdom	For Robert Lockhart, or Edmiston & Caple.
19 January	Drumcraig	Barque	Barrow Ship Building Co. Ltd.	Barrow-in-Furness	United Kingdom	For Gillison & Chadwick.
19 January	Electra	Cable ship	Messrs. Robert Napier & Sons	Govan	United Kingdom	For Eastern Telegraph Company.
19 January	Lyons	Steamship	Messrs. John Elder & Co.	Fairfield	United Kingdom	For London, Brighton and South Coast Railway and Chemins de fer de l'Ouest.
20 January	Lucipara	Merchantman	Messrs. Russell & Co.	Greenock	United Kingdom	For Messrs. P. Dennistoun & Co.
21 January	Precursor	Fishing trawler	Messrs. Cook, Welton & Gemmell	Hull	United Kingdom	For Mr. Hellyer.
22 January	Guahy	Steamship	Messrs. Caird & Co.	Greenock	United Kingdom	For Companie Bahianna.
26 January	Italy	Steamship	Messrs. John Elder & Co.	Fairfield	United Kingdom	For London, Brighton and South Coast Railway and Chemins de fer de l'Ouest.
28 January	Trojan	Steamship	Messrs. Murdoch & Murray	Port Glasgow	United Kingdom	For Messrs. J. & J. Macfarlane.
29 January	Santa André	Steamship	Messrs. Craig & Taylor	South Stockton	United Kingdom	For private owner.
31 January	Atalanta	Full-rigged ship	Messrs. Robert Duncan & Co.	Port Glasgow	United Kingdom	For Ninian Hill.
31 January	Hersilia	Schooner	Abercorn Shipbuilding Company	Paisley	United Kingdom	For private owner.
31 January	Northernhay	Barque	James Laing	Deptford	United Kingdom	For R. H. Gayner.
31 January	Rohilla	Merchantman	Messrs. Russell & Co.	Port Glasgow	United Kingdom	For Messrs. Foley & Co.
31 January	Soudan	Merchantman	Messrs. Richardson, Duck & Co.	South Stockton	United Kingdom	For British and Eastern Shipping Company Limited.
January	Excelsior	Steamship	Messrs. John Fullerton & Co.	Paisley	United Kingdom	For Thomas Corrigall.
January	Gardenia	Steamship	Messrs. D. & W. Henderson	Meadowside	United Kingdom	For Messrs. Alexander A. Laird & Co.
January	Primrose	Steamship	Messrs. H. M'Intyre & Co.	Paisley	United Kingdom	For Messrs. Richard Hughes & Co.
January	Southern Belle	Sailing barge	Messrs. G. P Gildon & Co.	Ipswich	United Kingdom	For E. Goodman.
January	Speedwell	Fishing vessel			United Kingdom	For James N. Smith.
January	Unnamed	Fishing vessel	Messrs. Cochrane & Co.	Beverley	United Kingdom	For Mr. Hellyer.
2 February	Clementine	Brigantine	William Bayley & Sons	Ipswich	United Kingdom	For W. Lethridge.
3 February	Alert	Schooner	Messrs. Brundrit & Co.	Runcorn	United Kingdom	For Messrs. James Foulkes & Co.
3 February	Red Rose	Tug	Messrs. Edward Finch & Co. (Limited)	Chepstow	United Kingdom	For David Guy.
5 February	Victoria Bay	Merchantman	Messrs. Russell & Co.	Kingston	United Kingdom	For Bay Line.
7 February	Alexandrine	Carola-class corvette	Kaiserliche Werft	Kiel	Germany	For Kaiserliche Marine.
10 February	Unnamed	Steam yacht	Robert Rodger	Port Glasgow	United Kingdom	For Mr. Mackay.
12 February	Malacca	Steamship	Messrs. Ramage & Ferguson	Leith	United Kingdom	For Messrs. Kim, Seng & Co.
12 February	Marion Crosbie	Barque	Messrs. Archibald M'Millan & Son	Dumbarton	United Kingdom	For Messrs. Rogers & Co.
16 February	Carlton	Steamship	Messrs. John Readhead & Sons	South Shields	United Kingdom	For Messrs. Chapman & Miller.
16 February	Kenilworth	Steamship	Messrs. Scott & Co.	Bowling	United Kingdom	For Messrs. William McLachlan & Co.
17 February	Benavon	Barque	Messrs. Birrell, Stenhouse & Co.	Dumbarton	United Kingdom	For Ben Line.
17 February	John Strachan	Steamship	Messrs. William Swain & Co.	Kelvindock	United Kingdom	For Kirkcaldy, Leith and Glasgow Steamship Carrying Company.
17 February	Loch Broom	Barque	Messrs. Barclay, Curle & Co.	Whiteinch	United Kingdom	For Loch Line.
17 February	Melbourne	Dredger	William Simons & Co.	Renfrew	United Kingdom	For Melbourne Harbour Commissioners.
17 February	Scythian	Steamship	Messrs. Murdoch & Murray	Port Glasgow	United Kingdom	For Messrs. J. & J. Macfarlane.
18 February	Damara	Steamship	Messrs. Alexander Stephen & Sons	Linthouse	United Kingdom	For Halifax Steam Navigation Company (Limited).
18 February	Northward	Steam trawler	Messrs. H. M'Intyre & Co.	Merksworth	United Kingdom	For Great Northern Steamship Fishing Company.
19 February	Itumba	Steamship	Barrow Ship Building Co. Ltd.	Barrow-in-Furness	United Kingdom	For T. W. Cookson & E. H. Cookson, or Messrs Hatton & Cookson.
19 February	Teneriffe	Cargo ship	Harland & Wolff	Belfast	United Kingdom	For British & Africa Steamship Co.
21 February	Eastwood	Steamship	Messrs. Earle's Shipbuilding and Engineering Company, Limited	Hull	United Kingdom	For Robert Jameson.
26 February	Firth of Stronaa	Barque	William Thompson	Whiteinch	United Kingdom	For Firth Line.
26 February	Sirius	Cargo liner	Flensburger Schiffbau-Gesellschaft	Flensburg	Germany	For Bergenske Dampskibs-Selskab.
28 February	Alacrity	Surprise-class cruiser	Palmers Shipbuilding and Iron Company	Jarrow	United Kingdom	For Royal Navy.
28 February	Alice	Steam fishing vessel	Messrs. Marr Bros.	Leith	United Kingdom	For Forth Steam Fishing Company.
28 February	Astoria	Barque	Robert Thompson & Sons	Sunderland	United Kingdom	For Peter Iredale & Son.
28 February	Britannia	Steamship	Messrs. S. & H. Morton & Co.	Leith	United Kingdom	For Messrs. James Currie & Co.
28 February	Lalpoora	Steamship	Messrs. William Denny & Bros.	Leven	United Kingdom	For British India Steam Navigation Company Limited.
28 February	Gaelic	Cargo liner	Harland & Wolff	Belfast	United Kingdom	For White Star Line.
28 February	Rosalind	Barque	Messrs. A. Hall & Co.	Aberdeen	United Kingdom	For Messrs. John Sutcliff & Sons.
February	Atlantic	Tug	Messrs. Hanna, Donald & Wilson	Paisley	United Kingdom	For private owner.
February	Village Belle	Fishing trawler	Messrs. Hunt, Fowler & Co.	Hull	United Kingdom	For R. Roach.
2 March	Prospect	Fishing smack	Messrs. Page & Chambers	Lowestoft	United Kingdom	For J. Lang.
2 March	Transition	Steamship	Messrs. Raylton Dixon & Co.	Middlesbrough	United Kingdom	For Messrs. J. M. Lennard & Sons.
3 March	General Stewart	Fishing smack	Messrs. Cottingham Bros.	Goole	United Kingdom	For Messrs. Pickering & Haldare.
3 March	Harland	Merchantman	Messrs. Richardson, Duck & Co.	South Stockton	United Kingdom	For William Lund.
4 March	Fifeshire	Barque	Messrs. Russell & Co.	Port Glasgow	United Kingdom	For Shire Line.
4 March	Isla	Steamship	Messrs. Blackwood & Gordon	Port Glasgow	United Kingdom	For Messrs. William Arrol & Co.
4 March	May	Fishing smack	Messrs. Fuller & Saunders	Lowestoft	United Kingdom	For Messrs. Thirtle & Hall.
5 March	Bandaneira	Merchantman	Messrs. Russell & Co.	greenock	United Kingdom	For Messrs. P. Denniston & Co.
5 March	Express	Paddle steamner	Messrs. Date & Sons	Kingsbridge	United Kingdom	For W. R. Beer.
5 March	Princess Maud	Steamship	Messrs. D. J. Dunlop & Co.	Port Glasgow	United Kingdom	For Messrs. M. Langlands & Sons.
10 March	Pointer	Steamship	Culzean Shipbuilding and Engineering Company (Limited)	Maidens	United Kingdom	For private owner.
14 March	Flying Fox	Paddle tug	J. T. Eltringham	South Shields	United Kingdom	For Clyde Shipping Company.
14 March	Libra	Steam trawler	Messrs. Earle's Shipbuilding and Engineering Company	Hull	United Kingdom	For Grimsby and North Sea Steam Trawling Company Limited.
14 March	Virgo	Steam trawler	Messrs. Earle's Shipbuilding and Engineering Company	Hull	United Kingdom	For Grimsby and North Sea Steam Trawling Company Limited.
16 March	Fear Not	Fishing boat	John Sclater	Banff	United Kingdom	For John Sclater.
16 March	Helen	Fishing boat	John Sclater	Banff	United Kingdom	For Messrs. James Mackenzie and George Sclater.
16 March	Petrel	Fishing boat	Messrs. J. M'Kenzie & Co	Leith	United Kingdom	For James L. Cunliffe.
16 March	Telamon	Steamship	Messrs. Scott & Co.	Greenock	United Kingdom	For Ocean Steamship Company.
18 March	Ariadne	Barque	Messrs. Archibald M'Millan & Sons	Dumbarton	United Kingdom	For Messrs. Lawrence, Sons & Co.
18 March	Limache	Barque	Messrs. W. Gray & Co.	West Hartlepool	United Kingdom	For Messrs. Brodersen, Vaughan & Co.
18 March	Naniwa	Naniwa-class cruiser	W G Armstrong	Newcastle upon Tyne	United Kingdom	For Imperial Japanese Navy.
18 March	Opal	Yacht	Messrs. W. White & Sons	Cowes	United Kingdom	For Major Brideson.
18 March	Osprey	Steam trawler	Messrs. J. M'Kenzie & Co.	Leith	United Kingdom	For James L. Cunliffe.
18 March	Petrel	Steam trawler	Messrs. J. M'Kenzie & Co.	Leith	United Kingdom	For J. L. Cunliffe.
18 March	Sitona	Steamship	Messrs. Wigham, Richardson & Co. Ltd	Low Walker	United Kingdom	For Avena Steam Navigation Company.
18 March	Ville d'Eau	Hopper dredger	Messrs. W. Simons & Co.	Renfrew	United Kingdom	For Enterprise Serrure.
19 March	Grenadier	Paddle steamer	Messrs. James & George Thomson	Clydebank	United Kingdom	For David MacBrayne.
20 March	Laura	Steamship	Messrs. Aitken & Mansel	Whiteinch	United Kingdom	For London and South Western Railway.
20 March	Nosshead	Barque	London and Glasgow Shipbuilding and Engineering Co., Limited	Govan	United Kingdom	For John Thompson Jr.
21 March	Earl Rosebery	Barque	Messrs. Russell & Co.	Kingston	United Kingdom	For Messrs. Macallister & Co.
21 March	Hercules	Tug	Messrs. Napier, Shanks & Bell	Yoker	United Kingdom	For Clyde Shipping Company.
21 March	Seagull	Paddle steamer	Messrs. Hall, Russell & Co.	Aberdeen	United Kingdom	For Indian General Steam Navigation Company.
30 March	Georgia	Steamship	Messrs. W. Gray & Co.	West Hartlepool	United Kingdom	For private owner.
30 March	Queen of England	Full-rigged ship	Messrs. Thomas Royden & Sons	Liverpool	United Kingdom	For Donald Kennedy.
31 March	Bempton	Steamship	Messrs. Edward Withy & Co.	West Hartlepool	United Kingdom	For Williamson W. Lamplough.
March	Cattona	Merchantman	Messrs. Richardson, Duck & C0	South Stockton	United Kingdom	For Messrs. J. H. Worthington & Co.
31 March	Chili	Barque	W. B. Thompson	Whiteinch	United Kingdom	For MM A. D. Bordes & Fils.
31 March	Ching-Wo	Steamship	Messrs. Raylton Dixon & Co.	Middlesbrough	United Kingdom	For China Shippers' Mutual Steam Navigation Co.
31 March	Katsuragi	Katsuragi-class corvette	Yokosuka Naval Arsenal	Yokosuka	Japan	For Imperial Japanese Navy.
31 March	Mersey	Protected cruiser	Chatham Dockyard	Chatham	United Kingdom	For Royal Navy.
31 March	Western Lass	Schooner	W. H. Shilston	Plymouth	United Kingdom	For private owner.
31 March	Unnamed	Steamship	Messrs. Blackwood & Gordon	Port Glasgow	United Kingdom	For Messrs. Tancred, Arrol & Co.
31 March	Unnamed	Steamship	Messrs. Blackwood & Gordon	Port Glasgow	United Kingdom	For Messrs. Tancred, Arrol & Co.
March	Edith Crossfield	Steamship	Messrs. Rodgers & Co.	Carrickfergus	United Kingdom	For Messrs. James Fisher & Sons.
March	Good News	Steamship		Liendwe, Lake Tanganyika	Congo Free State	For L.M.S. Mission.
March	Mary Kerr	Smack	William Fyfe	Fairlie	United Kingdom	For M. Kerr.
March	Mergui	Steamship	Messrs. H. M'Intyre & Co.	Paisley	United Kingdom	For British India Steam Navigation Company.
March	Turmit	Fishing boat	Messrs. Stephen & Forbes	Peterhead	United Kingdom	For Messrs. Reid Bros.
1 April	Snowdrop	Steam trawler	W. B. Thompson	Dundee	United Kingdom	For private owner.
2 April	Abercorn	Barque	Messrs. Alexander Stephen & Sons	Linthouse	United Kingdom	For Messrs. P. H. Dixon & Co.
2 April	Amy	Steam yacht	Messrs. D. & W. Henderson & Co.	Partick	United Kingdom	For Ninian B. Stewart.
2 April	Dagonet	Steam yacht	Mr. Ruddock	Middlesbrough	United Kingdom	For Messrs. J. & H. Duncan Bros.
2 April	El Callao	Steamship	Messrs. Ramage & Ferguson	Leith	United Kingdom	For Orinoco Steamship Company (Limited).
2 April	Eldorado	Steamship	Messrs. Earle's Shipbuilding and Engineering Co., Limited	Hull	United Kingdom	For Messrs. Thomas Wilson, Sons & Co.
4 April	Tartar	Steamship	Messrs. Scott & Co.	Bowling	United Kingdom	For Messrs. R. Walker & Co.
13 April	Courage	Steam trawler and fish carrier	Messrs. Raylton Dixon & Co	Middlesbrough	United Kingdom	For Great Yarmouth Steam Carrying Company, Limited.
14 April	Gartmore	Barque	Messrs. Archibald M'Millan & Son	Dumbarton	United Kingdom	For Messrs. Thomson, Dickie & Co.
15 April	Corangamite	Steamship	Messrs. C. S. Swan, Hunter & Co.	Wallsend	United Kingdom	For Huddart, Parker & Co. Ltd.
15 April	Lawada	Steamship	Messrs. William Denny & Bros.	Dumbarton	United Kingdom	For British India Steam Navigation Company, Limited.
15 April	Loch Carron	Barque	Messrs. Barclay, Curle & Co., Limited	Whiteinch	United Kingdom	For Messrs. Aitken, Lilburne & Co.
15 April	Maryborough	Dredger	Messrs. John Walker & Co.	Maryborough	Queensland	For private owner.
15 April	Tay	Steamship	Messrs. Pearce Bros.	Dundee	United Kingdom	For Dundee and Newcastle Shipping Company.
16 April	Bombe	Cruiser	Société Nouvelle des Forges et Chantiers de la Méditerranée	Granville	France	For French Navy.
16 April	Emulator	Steamship	Messrs. P. Rodgers & Co., Limited	Carrickfergus	United Kingdom	For Western Point Towing Company.
16 April	Formidable	Amiral Baudin-class battleship		Lorient	France	For French Navy
16 April	La Champagne	Steamship	Chantiers et Ateliers de Penhoët	Saint-Nazaire	France	For Compagnie Generale Transatlantique
16 April	General Gordon	Paddle tug	Messrs. J. P. Rennoldson & Sons	South Shields	United Kingdom	For Anthony Irving, or Dublin and Glasgow Steam Packet Company.
16 April	Kathleen Mavourneen	Paddle steamer	A. Jack & Co.	Seacombe	United Kingdom	For Drogheda Steam Packet Company.
16 April	Katrena	Steam yacht	Messrs. Ramage & Ferguson	Leith	United Kingdom	For John Anderson.
16 April	Lord Devon	Merchantman	Thomas Saunders	Salcombe	United Kingdom	For Salcombe Shipowning Company.
16 April	Ossian	Steamship	Messrs. Thomas B. Seath & Co.	Rutherglen	United Kingdom	For James Murray.
16 April	Prince Edward	Steamship	William Pickersgill & Sons	Sunderland	United Kingdom	For Thomas Seed.
16 April	Titan	Steamship	Messrs. Scott & Co.	Cartsdyke	United Kingdom	For Ocean Steamship Company.
16 April	Ulunda	Steamship	Messrs. Alexander Stephen & Sons	Linthouse	United Kingdom	For Halifax Steam Navigation Company.
17 April	Trevean	Steamship	Messrs. J. Readhead & Co.	South Shields	United Kingdom	For Messrs. E. Hain & Sons.
18 April	Dolphin	Paddle tug	Messrs. Blackwood & Gordon	Port Glasgow	United Kingdom	For Messrs. Tancred, Arrol & Co.
18 April	Indra	Tug	W. B. Thompson	Dundee	United Kingdom	For Ganges Steam Tug Company.
18 April	Mona's Queen	Paddle steamer	Barrow Shipbuilding Co.	Barrow-in-Furness	United Kingdom	For Isle of Man Steam Packet Company.
18 April	Royal Briton	Tug	Messrs. Edward Finch & Co., Limited	Chepstow	United Kingdom	For Messrs. Gibbs & Lee.
20 April	Brynhilda	Merchantman	Messrs. Alexander Stephen & Sons	Linthouse	United Kingdom	For Messrs. James W. Carmichael & Co.
20 April	General Gordon	Steamship	Messrs. A. & J. Inglis	Glasgow	United Kingdom	For Dublin and Glasgow Steampacket Company.
22 April	Unnamed	Paddle launch	Messrs. Matthew Paul & Co.	Dumbarton	United Kingdom	For Indian Government.
23 April	Elmina	Cargo ship	Harland & Wolff	Belfast	United Kingdom	For African Steamship Co.
23 April	Achéron	Achéron-class gunboat	Arsenal de Cherbourg	Cherbourg	France	For French Navy
28 April	Howe	Admiral-class ironclad		Pembroke Dockyard	United Kingdom	For Royal Navy.
28 April	Moravia	Steamship	Messrs. Aitken & Mansell	Whiteinch	United Kingdom	For James Cormack.
29 April	Ireland	Paddle steamer	Messrs. Laird	Birkenhead	United Kingdom	For City of Dublin Steamship Company.
29 April	Langdale	Merchantman	Messrs. W. H. Potter & Sons	Liverpool	United Kingdom	For Messrs. J. D. Newton & Co.
29 April	Sunbeam	Steamship	Messrs. T. B. Seath & Co.	Rutherglen	United Kingdom	For Morecambe Bay Steamboat Company.
30 April	Galatea	Yacht	Messrs. John Reid & Sons	Port Glasgow	United Kingdom	For Lieut. Heron.
30 April	Greystoke	Steamship	Messrs. Edward Withy & Co.	West Hartlepool	United Kingdom	For Messrs. Ropner & Co.
30 April	Queen Mab	Cutter	Messrs. Camper & Nicholson	Gosport	United Kingdom	For private owner.
30 April	Willem Eggerts	Barque	Messrs. H. M'Intyre & Co.	Paisley	United Kingdom	For Messrs. P. H. Dixon & Co.
April	Unnamed	Torpedo boat	J. S. White	East Cowes	United Kingdom	For J. S. White.
1 May	Goole No. 6	Tug	Victoria Engineering Works	Goole	United Kingdom	For Goole and Hull Steam Towing Company Limited.
1 May	Her Majesty	Paddle steamer	Messrs. Barclay, Curle & Co.	Whiteinch	United Kingdom	For Southampton and Isle of Wight Royal Mail Steam Packet Company.
1 May	Thompsonian	Steamship	Joseph L. Thompson & Sons	Sunderland	United Kingdom	For William Kish.
1 May	Yamato	Katsuragi-class corvette	Onohama Naval Arsenal	Onohama	Japan	For Imperial Japanese Navy.
2 May	Donegal	Steamship	Messrs. Craig, Taylor & Co	Stockton-on-Tees	United Kingdom	For private owners.
2 May	John o' Gaunt	Barque	Messrs. John Reid & Co.	Port Glasgow	United Kingdom	For Thomas Bell.
2 May	Margaret Murray	Schooner	Grangemouth Dockyard Company	Grangemouth	United Kingdom	For Murray & Waters.
2 May	Woolton	Merchantman	Messrs. Oswald, Mordaunt & Co	Southampton	United Kingdom	For Messrs. R. W. Leyland & Co.
4 May	Charles Connell	Full-rigged ship	Messrs. Charles Connell & Co.	Scotstoun	United Kingdom	For Messrs. John Black & Co.
5 May	Moy	Sailing ship	Russell & Co.	Greenock	United Kingdom	For Nourse Line.
6 May	Flamingo	Steam trawler and fish carrier	Messrs. Earle's Shipbuilding and Engineering Company, Limited	Hull	United Kingdom	For Great Grimsby Ice Company, Limited.
7 May	Polar	Steam lighter	Messrs. Scott & Co.	Bowling	United Kingdom	For Messrs. Ross & Marshall.
11 May	Britannia	Cable ship	Messrs. Laird Bros.	Birkenhead	United Kingdom	For Telegraph Construction and Maintenance Company.
13 May	Chazalie	Fishing smack	Messrs. Upham & Sons	Brigham	United Kingdom	For Mr. Hellyer.
13 May	Earl of Dunraven	Barque	Messrs. Russell & Co.	Kingston	United Kingdom	For Messrs. M'Allister & Co.
13 May	Forward	Ketch	Messrs. Stephen & Forbes	Peterhead	United Kingdom	For John M'Ritchie.
13 May	Girvan	Barque	London and Glasgow Engineering and Iron Shipbuilding Co.	Govan	United Kingdom	For David Hunter.
13 May	Heathpool	Steamship	The Sunderland Shipbuilding Co. Ltd.	Sunderland	United Kingdom	For H. T. Morton & Co.
14 May	Ailsa	Yacht	William Fyffe	Fairlie	United Kingdom	For Royal Northern Yacht Club.
14 May	Fairholme	Full-rigged ship	Messrs. Richardson, Duck & Co.	Stockton-on-Tees	United Kingdom	For Messrs. Carr & Ashcroft.
14 May	Kyle	Hopper dredger	Messrs. M'Knight, M'Creadie & Co.	Ayr	United Kingdom	For Ayr Harbour Trustees.
14 May	Richard Greaves	Schooner	David Jones	Portmadoc	United Kingdom	For John Davies.
16 May	Algoma	Steamship	Joseph L. Thompson & Sons	Sunderland	United Kingdom	For W. Tapscott & Co.
16 May	Como	Steam lighter	Barrow Ship Building Co. Ltd.	Barrow-in-Furness	United Kingdom	For Argentine Steam Lighter Co. Ltd.
16 May	John and Elizabeth	Sloop	Joseph Garside	Burton upon Stather	United Kingdom	For Messrs. J. Pickering & Son.
16 May	Minnyhive	Barque	Messrs. Robert Duncan & Co.	Port Glasgow	United Kingdom	For Village Line.
16 May	Offerton	Collier	S. P. Austin & Son	Sunderland	United Kingdom	For Earl of Durham.
16 May	Richard Hayward	Barque	William Doxford & Sons	Sunderland	United Kingdom	For Richard Hayward Ship Company Limited.
16 May	Salamander	Steam yacht	Messrs. Schlesinger, Davis & Co.	Wallsend	United Kingdom	For Frederick Power.
16 May	Silver King	Fishing smack	Messrs. Cottingham Bros.	Goole	United Kingdom	For J. Rutter.
16 May	Takachiho	Naniwa-class cruiser	Sir W. G. Armstrong, Mitchell & Co.	Newcastle upon Tyne	United Kingdom	For Imperial Japanese Navy.
16 May	Torridon	Merchantman	Messrs. Alexander Hall & Co.	Aberdeen	United Kingdom	For Messrs. Alexander Nichol & Co.
17 May	Condor	Torpedo cruiser		Rochefort	France	For French Navy.
17 May	Holland VI	Plunger-class submarine	Lewis Nixon	Elizabeth, New Jersey	United States	For United States Navy.
17 May	Unnamed	Yacht	Messrs. Hunna, Donald & Wilson	Paisley	United Kingdom	For private owner.
18 May	Albuera	Full-rigged ship	Messrs. James & George Thompson	Clydebank	United Kingdom	For Messrs. J. Hardie & Co.
18 May	Arcona	Carola-class corvette	Kaiserliche Werft	Danzig	United Kingdom	For Kaiserliche Marine.
18 May	Davaar	Steamship	London and Glasgow Shipbuilding and Engineering Company	Govan	United Kingdom	For Campbeltown and Glasgow Steam Packet Joint Stock Company.
18 May	Glenlora	Barque	Messrs. William Hamilton & Co.	Port Glasgow	United Kingdom	For Dundee Shipowners' Company.
18 May	Magenta	fishing smack	Messrs. Cook, Welton & Gemmell	Hull	United Kingdom	For private owner.
18 May	Mary Ann	Humber Keel	Richard Dunston	Thorne	United Kingdom	For Messrs. W. & B. Barraclough.
19 May	Soudan	Full-rigged ship	Messrs. Russell & Co.	Kingston	United Kingdom	For Gilbert M. Steeves.
19 May	Waverley	Paddle steamer	H. McIntyre & Co.	Paisley	United Kingdom	For Robert Campbell.
20 May	Richmond	Steamship	Messr. Gourlay Bros. & Co.	Dundee	United Kingdom	For Bruce Baird Nicholl.
21 May	Caïman	Terrible-class ironclad		Toulon	France	For French Navy.
22 May	Neiara	Yacht	Messrs. Payne & Sons	Southampton	United Kingdom	For Mr. Muir.
25 May	Manavi	Steamship	Messrs. Robert Napier & Sons	Govan	United Kingdom	For Pacific Steam Navigation Company.
25 May	Milan	Cruiser	Ateliers et Chantiers de la Loire	Saint-Nazaire	France	For French Navy.
26 May	Nerissa	Steam yacht	Messrs. Alexander Stephen & Sons	Linthouse	United Kingdom	For Alexander Stephen.
26 May	Puritan	Yacht	George Lawley & Son	Boston, Massachusetts	United States	For private owner.
27 May	Nerissa	Steam yacht	Messrs. Alexander Stephen & Sons	Linthouse	United Kingdom	For Alexander Stephen.
27 May	Unnamed	Paddle steamer	Messrs. Ramage & Ferguson	Leith	United Kingdom	For Church Missionary Society.
27 May	Unnamed	Steam launch	Messrs. Ramage & Ferguson	Leith	United Kingdom	For Messrs. Forrome, Son & Co.
28 May	Aberfoyle	Full-rigged ship	Messrs. A. M'Millan & Sons	Dumbarton	United Kingdom	For Gavin Cowper.
28 May	Bangkok	Steamship	Messrs. John Elder & Co.	Fairfield	United Kingdom	For Scottish Oriental Steamship Co., Limited.
28 May	Degrave	Steam trawler	Messrs. D. Allen & Co.	Grantown-on-Spey	United Kingdom	For M Degrave.
28 May	Silen	Steam yacht	Messrs. John Fullerton & Co.	Paisley	United Kingdom	For John N. Russell.
29 May	Dot	Steamboat	Messrs. Macdonald & Murray	Port Glasgow	United Kingdom	For private owner.
30 May	Actor	Steamship	Messrs. Raylton Dixon & Co.	Middlesbrough	United Kingdom	For private owner.
30 May	Avocet	Steamship	W. B. Thompson	Dundee	United Kingdom	For Cork Steamship Company, Limited.
30 May	Brixham	Steamship	Boolds, Sharer & Co.	Sunderland	United Kingdom	For Brixham Steamship Company.
30 May	City of Bristol	Fishing smack	W. McCann	Hull	United Kingdom	For Simpson & Bowman.
30 May	Countess	Steamship	Short Bros.	Pallion	United Kingdom	For Taylor & Sanderson Steam Shipping Company.
30 May	May Flower	Fishing trawler	Messrs. Cool, Welton & Gemmell	Hull	United Kingdom	For private owner.
30 May	Mount Kembla	Steamship	Messrs. M. Pearse & Co.	Stockton-on-Tees	United Kingdom	For private owner.
30 May	Willesden	Steamship	Messrs. W. Gray & Co.	West Hartlepool	United Kingdom	For Messrs. Watts, Ward & Co.
May	Atlas	Cutter	William Fife	Fairlie	United Kingdom	For Royal Northern Yacht Club.
May	Bayadere	Cutter	Culzean Shipbuilding Company	Culzean	United Kingdom	For G. L. Watson.
May	Earl Dunraven	Merchantman	Messrs. Russell & Co.	Kingston	United Kingdom	For Messrs. M'Allister & Co.
May	Edendale	Steamship	Blyth Shipbuilding Co. Ltd	Blyth	United Kingdom	For C. T. Irving & Co.
May	Electric	Steam yacht	Messrs. Hanna, Donald & Wilson	Paisley	United Kingdom	For private owner.
May	Floating Feather	Cutter	Messrs. John Reid & Co.	Port Glasgow	United Kingdom	For A. G. Pirie.
May	Galatea	Yacht	Messrs. John Reid & Co.	Port Glasgow	United Kingdom	For Lieut. Henn.
May	Salem	Steam yacht	Messrs. John Fullarton & Co.	Paisley	United Kingdom	For John N. Russell.
May	Sappho	Sloop		New York	United States	For James Gordon Bennett Jr. & W. P. Douglas.
1 June	Mohican	Steam yacht	Messrs. D. & W. Henderson	Partick	United Kingdom	For John Clark.
2 June	Diana Vernon	Paddle steamer	Messrs. Barclay, Curle & Co.	Whiteinch	United Kingdom	For North British Steam Packet Company.
2 June	Firth of Solway	Barque	William B. Thompson	Whiteinch	United Kingdom	For Firth Line.
2 June	Partridge	Cutter	Messrs. Camper & Nicholson	Gosport	United Kingdom	For J. H. Baillie.
2 June	Tay	East Indiaman	Messrs. Russell & Co.	Port Glasgow	United Kingdom	For private owner.
9 June	Unnamed	Sternwheel gunboat	Messrs. John Elder & Co.	Fairfield	United Kingdom	For War Office.
11 June	Glenesslin	Full-rigged ship	Messrs. Thomas Royden & Sons	Liverpool	United Kingdom	For Messrs. J. R. de Wolf & Son.
12 June	Eagle	Tug	Messrs. Pearce Bros.	Dundee	United Kingdom	For Messrs. Huddart, Parker & Co.
12 June	Requin	Terrible-class ironclad		Bordeaux	France	For French Navy.
12 June	Rosalind	Paddle steamer	Sir W. Armstrong, Mitchell & Co.	Low Walker	United Kingdom	For River Thames Steamboat Company.
12 June	Zimri	Fishing boat	William Young	Portsoy	United Kingdom	For Messrs. William & John Wood.
12 June	Unnamed	Tug	Messrs. Hawthorns & Co.	Leith	United Kingdom	For Metropolitan Board of Works.
13 June	Akaba	Steamship	Messrs. M. Pearse & Co.	Stockton-on-Tees	United Kingdom	For private owner.
13 June	City of Lincoln	Fishing smack	Richard Day	New Holland	United Kingdom	For Simpson & Bowman.
13 June	Coromandel	Steamship	Messrs. Caird & Co.	Greenock	United Kingdom	For Peninsular and Oriental Steam Navigation Company.
13 June	Dovenby Hall	Merchantman	Palmer's Iron Shipbuilding and Engineering Company	Jarrow	United Kingdom	For Messrs. Herron, Dunn & Co.
13 June	Grao	Steamship	Messrs. John Readhead & Sons	South Shields	United Kingdom	For Compania Valenciana de Navigacion.
13 June	Halewood	Steamship	Messrs. Oswald, Mordaunt & Co.	Southampton	United Kingdom	For Messrs. R. W. Leyland & Co.
13 June	Midnatssol	Barque	Messrs. W. Gray & Co.	West Hartlepool	United Kingdom	For F. Smith Petersen.
13 June	Panther	Panther-class cruiser	W. G. Armstrong	Newcastle upon Tyne	United Kingdom	For Austro-Hungarian Navy.
13 June	Pioneer	Steam fishing vessel	Marr Bros.	Leith	United Kingdom	For Pioneer Steam Fishing Company.
13 June	Ruthwell	Barque	Messrs. Robert Duncan & Co.	Greenock	United Kingdom	For Village Line.
13 June	Walter de Lancy	Steamship	John Priestman & Co.	Sunderland	United Kingdom	For A. Centeno.
13 June	White Rose	Tug	Messrs. E. Finch & Co., Limited	Chepstow	United Kingdom	For Messrs. D. B. M'Cullom & Sons.
15 June	Benbow	Admiral-class battleship	Thames Ironworks and Shipbuilding Co Ltd.	Leamouth	United Kingdom	For Royal Navy.
15 June	Chala	Barque	William Pickersgill & Sons	Sunderland	United Kingdom	For Samuel Wakeham & Son.
15 June	Kate Thomas	Barque	William Doxford & Sons	Sunderland	United Kingdom	For Kate Thomas Sailing Ship Company.
16 June	Costa Rican	Cargo ship	Harland & Wolff	Belfast	United Kingdom	For West India Steam Navigation Co.
16 June	Tweed	Steamship	Messrs. Wood, Skinner & Co. Ltd.	Gateshead	United Kingdom	For George W. Nicoll.
17 June	Edinburgh	Barque	Messrs. Charles Connell & Co.	Scotstoun	United Kingdom	For Mr. Gardiner.
17 June	Ormerod	Steamship	Messrs. Oswald, Mordaunt & Co.	Southampton	United Kingdom	For Colonel Thursby.
18 June	Acolite	Steam lighter	Messrs. Scott & Co.	Bowling	United Kingdom	For Messrs. Ross & Marshall.
18 June	Hilston	Merchantman	Messrs. Russell & Co.	Greenock	United Kingdom	For James Anderson.
19 June	Parthenhope	Smack	W. Caisley	Howden Dyke	United Kingdom	For John Holmes.
20 June	Alert	Steamship	Messrs. John Fullerton & Co.	Merksworth	United Kingdom	For John T. Lainé.
20 June	Nachtigal	Armed steamship	Schiff-und Maschinenbau-Aktien-Gesellschaft	Kiel	Germany	For Kaiserliche Marine.
23 June	Kilwa	Steamship	Flensburger Schiffbau-Gesellschaft	Flensburg	Germany	For Sultan of Zanzibar.
24 June	Infanta Isabel	Velasco-class cruiser		Cádiz	Spain	For Spanish Navy.
26 June	Emilie	Steamship	Messrs. Edward Withy & Co.	West Hartlepool	United Kingdom	For Messrs. Burdick & Cook.
26 June	Leven	Hopper dredger	Messrs. William Simmons & Co.	Renfrew	United Kingdom	For Dumbarton Harbour Board.
27 June	Baghdadi	Steamship	Neptune Yard	Newcastle upon Tyne	United Kingdom	For Persian Gulf Steamship Company.
27 June	Rinda	Corvette		Saint Petersburg	Russia	For Imperial Russian Navy.
27 June	Vaitarna	Steamship	Grangemouth Dockyard Company	Grangemouth	United Kingdom	For Bombay Steam Navigation Company.
29 June	Inishtrahull	Steamship	D. & W. Henderson Ltd.	Glasgow	United Kingdom	For Clyde Shipping Company.
29 June	Lady Arthur Hill	Steamship	Messrs. McIlwaine & Lewis	Belfast	United Kingdom	For East Downshire Steamship Company.
29 June	Lily of the Valley	Fishing boat	Messrs. Stephenson & Co.	Macduff	United Kingdom	For George Falconer.
29 June	Mararoa	Steamship	Messrs. William Denny & Bros.	Dumbarton	United Kingdom	For Union Steamship Company of New Zealand.
30 June	County of Edinburgh	Full-rigged ship	Messrs. Barclay, Curle & Co.	Whiteinch	United Kingdom	For County Line.
30 June	Crown of India	Barque	Messrs. Ramage & Ferguson	Leith	United Kingdom	For Messrs. Robertson, Cruickshank & Co.
30 June	Raphael	Steamship	Joseph L. Thompson & Sons	Sunderland	United Kingdom	For Frederick Bolton & Co.
30 June	Queen of the Usk	Tug	Messrs. Mordey, Carney & Co. (Limited)	Newport	United Kingdom	For Messrs. Mordey, Carney & Co. (Limited).
30 June	Rynda	Vitiaz-class cruiser		Saint Petersburg	Russia	For Imperial Russian Navy.
30 June	Zemindar	Sailing ship	Harland & Wolff	Belfast	United Kingdom	For T. & J. Brocklebank.
June	Puritan	Sloop		New York	United States	For Eastern Yacht Club.
June	No. 21	Steam lighter	W. S. Cumming	Parkhead	United Kingdom	For Redding Colliery Company.
1 July	Fort James	Merchantman	Messrs. Workman, Clarke & Co., Limited	Belfast	United Kingdom	For Messrs. Clark & Service.
2 July	Condor	Barque	Messrs. Oswald, Mordaunt & Co.	Southampton	United Kingdom	For G. Petrie.
2 July	Energy	Lugger	Messrs. Chambers & Page	Lowestoft	United Kingdom	For Messrs. Harvey Bros.
2 July	Frances Fisher	Barque	Messrs. A. M'Millan & Sons	Dumbarton	United Kingdom	For F. R. Fisher.
2 July	Unity	Fishing trawler	Messrs. Cool, Welton & Gemmell	Hul	United Kingdom	For private owner. Run into by Doncaster on being launched and was severely damaged.
6 July	Phœnix	Steam yacht	Messrs. Fleming & Ferguson	Leith	United Kingdom	For private owner.
10 July	Irene	Ferry	Harland & Wolff	Belfast	United Kingdom	For London and North Western Railway.
11 July	Gian Paolo	Steamship	The Sunderland Shipbuilding Co. Ltd	Sunderland	United Kingdom	For Giacopini Bros.
11 July	Newcastle	Steamship	Messrs. C. S. Swan, Hunter & Co.	Wallsend	United Kingdom	For Messrs. J. J. & C. M. Forster.
11 July	Ocean Prince	Steamship	Short Bros.	Sunderland	United Kingdom	For Prince Line.
11 July	Wells City	Steamship	North of England Shipbuilding Company	Sunderland	United Kingdom	For Charles Hill & Sons.
12 July	Venture	Steamship	Thomas Copper	Londonderry	United Kingdom	For private owner.
13 July	Argo	Steamship	Messrs. Scott & Co.	Cartsdyke	United Kingdom	For Alfred Holt.
13 July	Fairy	Tug	Messrs. Newell & Co.	Bristol	United Kingdom	For private owner.
13 July	Gladstone	Dredger	Messrs. Fleming & Ferguson	Paisley	United Kingdom	For Wick & Pulteney Harbour Trustees.
13 July	Sir Robert Peel	Steamship	Messrs. R. Craggs & Sons	Middlesbrough	United Kingdom	For Messrs. W. H. Carey & Sons.
13 July	Va y Ven	Steamship	Messrs. Cochrane, Hamilton & Co.	Beverley	United Kingdom	For Señor Juan B. de Longa.
13 July	Ven y Va	Steamship	Messrs. Cochrane, Hamilton & Co.	Beverley	United Kingdom	For Señor Juan B. de Longa.
14 July	Carl Rahtkens	Steamship	Messrs. John Readhead & Co.	South Shields	United Kingdom	For Messrs. Franz Rahtkens & Co.
14 July	Editor	Steamship	Messrs. M. Pearse & Co.	Stockton-on-Tees	United Kingdom	For private owner.
14 July	Ochertipe	Barque	Messrs. R. Duncan & Co.	Port Glasgow	United Kingdom	For Hugh Hogarth.
15 July	Arctic Stream	Merchantman	Messrs. Russell & Co.	Port Glasgow	United Kingdom	For L. Polson.
15 July	Clan MacPherson	Full-rigged ship	Messrs. Russell & Co.	Kingstobn	United Kingdom	For Messrs. Thomas Dunlop & Sons.
15 July	Samson	Steamship	K. Larsen	Arendal	Norway	For Smith & Thommesen.
15 July	Unnamed	Steamship	W. S. Cumming	Monkland Canal	United Kingdom	For private owner.
15 July	Unnamed	Dredger	Messrs. William Simons & Co.	Renfrew	United Kingdom	For Belfast Harbour Commissioners.
16 July	Alarm	Steamship	Messrs. W. H. Potter & Sons	Liverpool	United Kingdom	For Mersey Docks & Harbour Board.
16 July	Clan M'Pherson	Merchantman	Messrs. Russell & Co.	Kingston	United Kingdom	For Messrs. Thomas Dunlop & Sons.
16 July	Hecate	Steamship	Messrs. W. H. Potter & Sons	Liverpool	United Kingdom	For Alfred Holt.
17 July	Quinta Hermosa	Steamship	Messrs. Fullarton & Co.	Paisley	United Kingdom	For Marquis de Mouroy.
18 July	Ariel	Steamship	Earle's Shipbuilding and Engineering Co., Limited	Hull	United Kingdom	For Edward Leetham.
18 July	Semiramis	Steamship	The Sunderland Shipbuilding Co. Ltd	Sunderland	United Kingdom	For William Watt.
23 July	Nixe	Corvette	Kaiserliche Werft	Danzig	United Kingdom	For Kaiserliche Marine.
25 July	Freya	Corvette	Kockums Mekaniska Verkstad	Malmö	Sweden	For Royal Swedish Navy.
25 July	Rosa	Pilot boat	Messrs. Workman, Clarke & Co.	Belfast	United Kingdom	For Belfast Harbour Commissioners.
25 July	Unnamed	Steam launch	Messrs. Edwards & Symes	Cubitt Town	United Kingdom	For Corporation of the City of London.
27 July	Ban Whatt Hin	Steamship	Messrs. Blackwood & Gordon	Port Glasgow	United Kingdom	For Messrs. E. Boustead & Co.
27 July	Icarus	Mariner-class gunvessel		Devonport Dockyard	United Kingdom	For Royal Navy.
28 July	Beresford	Steamship	Messrs. Edward Withy & Co.	West Hartlepool	United Kingdom	For George Horsley.
28 July	Esperança	Steam trawler	Messrs. Cochran & Co.	Birkenhead	United Kingdom	For Messrs. Castel & Pontet.
30 July	Francesco Morosini	Ruggiero di Lauria-class ironclad	Venetian Arsenal	Venice	Italy	For Regia Marina.
30 July	Scout	Torpedo cruiser	Messrs. J. & G. Thomson	Clydebank	United Kingdom	For Royal Navy.
31 July	Dugue	Torpedo boat		Le Havre	France	For French Navy.
31 July	Pearl	Steamship	Messrs. John Fullerton & Co.	Paisley	United Kingdom	For William Robertson.
July	Orestes	Ketch	David Banks & Co.	Plymouth	United Kingdom	For David Banks.
1 August	Unnamed	Lightship	Messrs. C. Hill & Sons	Hotwells	United Kingdom	For Trinity House.
6 August	Warrior	Tug	Messrs. Allsup & Sons	Preston	United Kingdom	For Leeds and Liverpool Canal Company.
8 August	Bactria	Full-rigged ship	Messrs. Oswald, Mordaunt & Co.	Southampton	United Kingdom	For Messrs T. & J. Brocklebank.
10 August	Barcoo	Passenger ship	William Denny & Brothers	Dumbarton	United Kingdom	For Queensland Steam Shipping Company.
10 August	Timandra	Full-rigged ship	Messrs. Robert Duncan & Co.	Port Glasgow	United Kingdom	For George F. Smith.
11 August	Isle of Hastings	Steamship	Messrs. H. S. Edwards & Son	Howdon	United Kingdom	For Messrs. Dixon, Robson & Co.
11 August	Latimer	Merchantman	Messrs. W. Gray & Co.	West Hartlepool	United Kingdom	For Messrs J. Lidgett & Sons.
11 August	Magnat	Barque	S. P. Austin & Son	Sunderland	United Kingdom	For Gerd Bolte & Co.
11 August	Malaysia	Merchantman	Messrs. Russell & Co.	Greenock	United Kingdom	For Messrs. J. & W. Goffey.
12 August	City of Bombay	Steamship	Messrs. Workman, Clarke & Co.	Belfast	United Kingdom	For Messrs. George Smith & Sons.
12 August	Sheldrake	Steamship	W. B. Thompson	Dundee	United Kingdom	For Cork Steamship Company (Limited).
12 August	Unnamed	Tug	Messrs. Hawthorns & Co.	Leith	United Kingdom	For Metropolitan Board of Works / Thames Fire Brigade.
13 August	Dikili	Steamship	Messrs. Allsup & Co.	Preston	United Kingdom	For Messrs. Essayan, Shahum & Co.
13 August	The Belle	Lugger	S. C. Allerton	Lowestoft	United Kingdom	For Messrs. T. Brown & Son.
13 August	Walter Scott	Steamship	Blyth Shipbuilding Co. Ltd	Blyth	United Kingdom	For Walter Scott.
14 August	Fé	Steam trawler	Messrs. J. T. Cochran & Co.	Birkenhead	United Kingdom	For Pará Fishing Company.
14 August	Lord Salisbury	Fishing smack	Messrs. Cottingham Bros.	Goole	United Kingdom	For Messrs. Pickering & Haldane.
14 August	Shakespear	Steamship	Joseph L. Thompson & Sons	Sunderland	United Kingdom	For Glover Bros.
15 August	Black Pearl	Steam yacht	Culzean Shipbuilding and Engineering Company, Limited	Douglaston	United Kingdom	For Earl of Pembroke & Montgomery.
15 August	Elfin	Steam yacht	Messrs. Marr Bros.	Leith	United Kingdom	For Walter Strang. Holed on being launched and sank.
17 August	Bowman B. Law	Barque	Messrs. A. M'Millan & Son	Dumbarton	United Kingdom	For Messrs. William Law & Co.
17 August	Jesse Carll	Schooner	Jesse Carll	Northport, New York	United States	For Jesse Carll, D. H. Nicholl and George H. Sisco.
18 August	Linda Park	Barquentine	S. M'Knight & Co	Ayr	United Kingdom	For James W. Vallentine & Co.
18 August	Unnamed	Steamship	W. S. Cumming	Monkland Canal	United Kingdom	For private owner.
22 August	Lee Sang	Steamship	London and Glasgow Engineering and Iron Shipbuilding Company	Govan	United Kingdom	For Indo-China Steam Navigation Company, Limited.
22 August	Talookdar	Sailing ship	Harland & Wolff	Belfast	United Kingdom	For T. & J. Brocklebank.
23 August	Crocus	Ferry	W. Allsup & Sons Ltd.	Preston	United Kingdom	For Wallasey Local Board.
24 August	Alexandra	Tug	Messrs. Earle's Shipbuilding and Engineering Company	Hull	United Kingdom	For Hull, Barnsley & West Riding Junction Railway and Dock Company.
24 August	Dundale	Barque	Messrs. Russell & Co.	Port Glasgow	United Kingdom	For Messrs. James Dunn & Sons.
25 August	Cabo Trafalgar	Steamship	Messrs. C. S. Swan & Hunter	Wallsend	United Kingdom	For Messrs. Ybarra & Co.
26 August	Isabel Browne	Barque	Messrs. Russell & Co.	Port Glasgow	United Kingdom	For Messrs. Browne & Watson.
26 August	Quarta	Steam trawler	Messrs. Hawthorns & Co.	Leith	United Kingdom	For Messrs. J. & L. Dossaer.
27 August	Clytie	Barquentine	Grangemouth Dockyard Shipbuilding Company	Grangemouth	United Kingdom	For private owner.
27 August	Dunrobin	Steamship	Messrs. Scott & Co	Bowling	United Kingdom	For Messrs. John and William W. C. Smith.
27 August	General Gordon	Steamship	Messrs. Alexander Stephen & Son	Linthouse	United Kingdom	For Messrs. Maclay & McIntyre.
27 August	Glenavna Park	Barquentine	Paul Rodgers	Carrickfergus	United Kingdom	For Messrs. James W. Valentine & Co.
27 August	Hö Kwéi	Steamship	Messrs. Blackwood & Gordon	Port Glasgow	United Kingdom	For John Buttery & Co.
27 August	Lady Beatrice	Steam yacht	Messrs. Ramage & Ferguson	Leith	United Kingdom	For Townley Parker.
27 August	Port Victor	Steamship	Andrew Leslie & Co.	Hebburn	United Kingdom	For Anglo-Australasian Steam Navigation Co.
27 August	Suez	Steamship	Messrs. W. Gray & Co.	West Hartlepool	United Kingdom	For Messrs. Thomas Appleby & Co.
29 August	Buffalo	Steamship	Palmer Shipbuilding and Iron Company	Jarrow	United Kingdom	For Messrs. Thomas Wilson, Sons & Co.
29 August	Flamme	Fusée-class gunboat	Arsenal de Cherbourg	Cherbourg	France	For French Navy
31 August	Volta	Electric boat	Mr. Skelton	Millwall	United Kingdom	For Messrs. Stephens, Smith & Co.
August	Edward Birkbeck	Fishing smack		Bideford	United Kingdom	For Mission to Deep Sea Fishermen.
August	Multnomah	Sternwheeler	East Portland, Oregon		United States	For private owner.
August	Unnamed	Merchantman		Rockland, Maine	United States	For private owner. First 4-masted ship built in USA.
1 September	Torpedo	Steamship	Messrs. Earle's Shipbuilding and Engineering Company, Limited	Hull	United Kingdom	For Messrs. Thomas Wilson, Sons & Co.
5 September	Charlotte	Corvette	Kaiserliche Werft	Wilhelmshaven	Germany	For Kaiserliche Marine.
7 September	Hyderabad	Barque	Messrs. Russell & Co.	Kingston	United Kingdom	For Messrs. W. & J. Crawford.
7 September	Oliva	Steamship	Messrs. C. S. Swan, Hunter & Co.	Wallsend	United Kingdom	For Thomas Rodenacker.
8 September	Buccaneer	Steamship	Messrs. Wigham, Richardson & Co.	Low Walker	United Kingdom	For private owner.
8 September	Unnamed	Steam fishing vessel	Messrs. Mackenzie & Co.	Leith	United Kingdom	For James S. Cunliffe.
9 September	Chepica	Barque	William Pickersgill & Sons	Sunderland	United Kingdom	For Samuel Wakeham & Son.
9 September	Heliades	Steamship	Messrs. Richardson, Duck & Co	Middleton	United Kingdom	For Messrs. R. P. Houston & Co.
9 September	La Bretagne	Ocean liner	Compagnie Générale Transatlantique	Penhöet	France	For Compagnie Générale Transatlantique.
9 September	Poseidon	Steamship		Trieste	Trieste	For Österreichischer Lloyd.
9 September	Principality	Full-rigged ship	William Doxford & Sons	Sunderland	United Kingdom	For Principality Shipping Co. Ltd., or William Thomas.
9 September	Restitution	Steamship	Messrs. Wigham, Richardson & Co.	Low Walker	United Kingdom	For Messrs. R. Conaway & Co.
10 September	Elizabeth Peers	Schooner	Messrs. William Thomas & Sons	Amlwch Port	United Kingdom	For William Postlewaite.
10 September	Enfield	Steamship	Messrs. W. Gray & Co.	West Hartlepool	United Kingdom	For Messrs. Pyman Bros.
10 September	Leopard	Panther-class cruiser	W G Armstrong	Newcastle upon Tyne	United Kingdom	For Austro-Hungarian Navy.
10 September	Recorder	Cable ship	Messrs. Robert Napier & Sons	Glasgow	United Kingdom	For Easter Extension (Australasia and China) Telegraph Company.
10 September	Waikna	Steamship	Robert Thompson & Sons	Sunderland	United Kingdom	For H. Ellis.
10 September	Washington City	Steamship	Messrs Edward Withy & Co.	Hartlepool	United Kingdom	For C. Furness.
10 September	Unnamed	Steamship	Messrs. Murdoch & Murray	Port Glasgow	United Kingdom	For private owner.
11 September	Mary Jane	Fishing smack	George Brown	Sculcoates	United Kingdom	For Henry Maddick.
12 September	Unnamed	Torpedo boat	Richard Smith	Preston	United Kingdom	For British Government.
14 September	Spenser	Steamship	Messrs. Oswald, Mordaunt & Co.	Southampton	United Kingdom	For Messrs. Lamport & Holt.
15 September	Bacchante	Fishing smack	J. Garside	Burton upon Stather	United Kingdom	For Mr. Jipson.
15 September	Corryvrechan	Barque	Messrs. Robert Duncan & Co.	Port Glasgow	United Kingdom	For Hugh Hogarth.
15 September	Eurasia	Merchantman	Messrs. Russell & Co.	Greenock	United Kingdom	For Messrs. J. & W. Goffey.
18 September	Unnamed	Steam launch	W. S. Cumming	Monkland Canal	United Kingdom	For Messrs. Ross & Duncan.
20 September	Snowdrop	Ferry	W. Allsup & Sons Ltd.	Preston	United Kingdom	For Wallasey Local Board.
22 September	Lismore	Full-rigged ship	Messrs. Charles Connell & Co.	Scotstoun	United Kingdom	For Messrs. James Gardiner & Co.
22 September	Queen's Island	Barque	Harland & Wolff	Belfast	United Kingdom	For Samuel Lawther.
22 September	Saltees	Steamship	Messrs. D. & W. Henderson	Meadowside	United Kingdom	For Clyde Shipping Company.
22 September	William Jolliffe	Tug	Messrs. John Readhead & Sons	South Shields	United Kingdom	For T. A. Jolliffe.
24 September	Crown of Italy	Full-rigged ship	Messrs. Ramage & Ferguson	Leith	United Kingdom	For Messrs. Robertson, Cruickshank & Co.
24 September	Earlscourt	Barque	Messrs. Russell & Co.	Port Glasgow	United Kingdom	For Messrs. Keet & Kitt.
24 September	Hangchow	Steamship	Messrs. Scott & Sons	Cartsdyke	United Kingdom	For Messrs. J. Swire & Sons.
24 September	Henry Venn	Paddle steamer	Messrs. Ramage & Ferguson	Leith / Akassa	United Kingdom / Oil Rivers Protectorate	For Church Missionary Society.
24 September	Thetis	Barque	Messrs. Alexander Stephen & Sons	Dundee	United Kingdom	For Messrs. Alexander Stephen & Sons.
25 September	Forfarshire	Barque	Messrs. Birrell, Stenhouse & Co.	Dumbarton	United Kingdom	For Shire Line.
25 September	Gadfly	Steam yacht	Messrs. Joseph L. Thompson & Sons	Sunderland	United Kingdom	For private owner.
25 September	Quebracho	Steamship	Messrs. John Fullerton & Co.	Merksworth	United Kingdom	For Señor Don Pedro Risso.
26 September	Challenger	Tug	Messrs. Cox & Co.	Falmouth	United Kingdom	For private owner.
26 September	Chelydra	Steamship	Joseph L. Thompson & Sons	Sunderland	United Kingdom	For Angier Bros.
26 September	Etna	Cruiser	Regio Cantiere di Castellammare di Stabia	Castellamare di Stabia	Italy	For Regia Marina.
26 September	Mereddio	Steamship	Messrs. William Gray & Co.	West Hartlepool	United Kingdom	For Messrs. Marshall, Dobson & Co.
26 September	Unnamed	Fishing smack	Albert Dock Mast and Block Company	Hull	United Kingdom	Sold by auction on 1 October to J. Mumby.
28 September	Stormcock	Tug	Messrs. Laird Bros.	Birkenhead	United Kingdom	For Liverpool Screw Towing and Lighterage Company.
28 September	Unnamed	Steam lighter	Messrs. J. M'Arthur & Co.	Paisley	United Kingdom	For private owner.
29 September	Severn	Mersey-class cruiser		Chatham Dockyard	United Kingdom	For Royal Navy.
29 September	Gefion	Hopper dredger	Messrs. William Simons & Co.	Renfrew	United Kingdom	For Danish Government.
30 September	Natuna	Barque	Messrs. Russell & Co.	Greenock	United Kingdom	For Messrs. Peter Denniston & Co.
3 October	Lamberton	Steam trawler	W. B. Thompson	Dundee	United Kingdom	For private owner.
6 October	Evelyn	Steam fishing vessel	Messrs. J. M'Kenzie & Co.	Leith	United Kingdom	For Messrs. Haworth & Clarke.
7 October	Armida	Full-rigged ship	Messrs. Barclay, Curle & Co.	Whiteinch	United Kingdom	For William Letham.
8 October	Amana	Steamship	Messrs. M. Pearse & Co.	Stockton-on-Tees	United Kingdom	For private owner.
8 October	La Bourgogne	Ocean liner	Forges et Chantiers de la Méditeranée	La Seyne	France	For Compagnie Générale Transatlantique.'
8 October	Le Lillois	Steam trawler	Messrs. Hawthorns & Co.	Leith	United Kingdom	For J. L. Dossaer.
8 October	Zion	Smack	J. H. Vaux	Harwich	United Kingdom	For private owner.
10 October	Caloric	Ferry	Harland & Wolff	Belfast	United Kingdom	For Belfast Steamship Co.
12 October	Dordogne	Steamship	Osbourne, Graham & Co.	Sunderland	United Kingdom	For Cardiff Steamship Company.
13 October	Kilmory	East Indiaman	Messrs. Russell & Co.	Kingston	United Kingdom	For Messrs. Kerr, Newton & Co.
13 October	Pass of Leny	Barque	London and Glasgow Engineering and Iron Shipbuilding Company	Govan	United Kingdom	For Messrs. Gibson & Clark.
13 October	Stella	Steamship	Messrs. Edward Withy & Co.	Hartlepool	United Kingdom	For Messrs. Herskind & Woods.
14 October	Hebe	Steamship	Messrs. Scott & Co.	Greenock	United Kingdom	For Ocean Steamship Company.
14 October	Pons Aelii	Merchantman	William Doxford & Sons	Sunderland	United Kingdom	For Chevilotte Frères.
15 October	Itamaraty	Paddle steamer	Messrs. James & George Thomson	Clydebank	United Kingdom	For private owner.
20 October	Sardhana	Barque	Messrs. Russell & Co.	Kingston	United Kingdom	For Messrs. W. & J. Crawford.
20 October	Unnamed	Torpedo boat or gunboat		Keyham	United Kingdom	For Royal Navy. Capsized on being launched and was severely damaged.
21 October	Admiral Nakhimov	Armoured cruiser	Baltic Works	Saint Petersburg	Russia	For Imperial Russian Navy
22 October	King Malcolm	Barque	W. B. Thompson	Whiteinch	United Kingdom	For Messrs. Walker, Govan & Co.
23 October	Curlew	Gunboat		Devonport Dockyard	United Kingdom	For Royal Navy.
23 October	Mascotte	Steamship	William Cramp & Sons	Philadelphia	United States	For Plant Steamship Line.
24 October	Cabo Palos	Steamship	Joseph. L. Thompson & Sons	Sunderland	United Kingdom	For Ybarra Cia S.A.
24 October	Dragoman	Steamship	Sir W. G. Armstrong, Mitchell & Co.	Low Walker	United Kingdom	For Bedouin Steam Navigation Company.
24 October	Eblana	Hopper barge	Harland & Wolff	Belfast	United Kingdom	For Dublin Harbour Board.
24 October	Fulwood	Merchantman	Messrs. Oswald, Mordaunt & Co.	Southampton	United Kingdom	For Messrs. R. W. Leyland & Co.
24 October	Waverley	East Indiaman	Messrs. Russell & Co.	Kingston	United Kingdom	For Messrs. Russell & Pinkerton.
26 October	Orellana	Barque	Messrs. John Reid & Co.	Port Glasgow	United Kingdom	For Messrs. Nicholson & M'Gill.
26 October	Roumelia	Steamship	Messrs. W. Gray & Co.	West Hartlepool	United Kingdom	For Langstaff, Ehrenberg & Pollak.
27 October	Battle Isle	Steamship	Messrs. Scott & Co.	Bowling	United Kingdom	For Messrs. Hay & Tarbert.
27 October	Celtic Chief	Full-rigged ship	Messrs. A. M'Millan & Son	Dumbarton	United Kingdom	For Messrs. Parry, Jones & Co.
27 October	George B. Balfour	Schooner	Paul Rodgers	Carrickfergus	United Kingdom	For Messrs. James Fisher & Sons.
27 October	Hero	Conqueror-class battleship	Chatham Dockyard	Chatham	United Kingdom	For Royal Navy.
27 October	Ovellana	Barque	Messrs. John Reid & Co.	Port Glasgow	United Kingdom	For Messrs. Nicholson & M'Gill.
27 October	Soochow	Steamship	Messrs. Scott & Co.	Greenock	United Kingdom	For China Navigation Company (Limited).
27 October	Swallow	Nymphe-class sloop		Sheerness Dockyard	United Kingdom	For Royal Navy.
28 October	Avoca	Merchantman	Messrs. Russell & Co.	Greenock	United Kingdom	For James Nourse.
29 October	Dee	Barque	Messrs. Russell & Co.	Port Glasgow	United Kingdom	For Mr. M'Farlane.
29 October	Persepolis	Cruiser	AG Weser	Bremen	Germany	For Persian Navy.
October	Agnes	Steamship	Messrs. Jameson & Crocker	Belcher Bay	Hong Kong	For French Government.
October	Birkenhead	Steam launch	Messrs. Cochran & Co.	Birkenhead	United Kingdom	For Messrs. W. Carden & Co.
October	Ethel	Schooner	Culzean Shipbuilding Company	Culzean	United Kingdom	For Egyptian Government.
October	No. 4	Hopper dredger	Messrs. William Simons & Co.	Renfrew	United Kingdom	For Belfast Harbour Commissioners.
5 November	Jarl	Steamship	Helsingør Jarnskibs-og Maskinbyggeri	Helsingør	Denmark	For Det Østbornholmske Dampskibs-Selskab.
6 November	Bengal	Steamship	Messrs. Caird & Co.	Greenock	United Kingdom	For Peninsular and Oriental Steam Navigation Company.
6 November	Knight of St. Patrick	Steamship	Grangemouth Dockyard Company	Grangemouth	United Kingdom	For Messrs. J. Prendeville & Co.
7 November	Dundee	Steamship	Messrs. Gourlay Bros.	Dundee	United Kingdom	For Dundee, Perth & London Shipping Company.
7 November	Flying Fish	Paddle tug	J. T. Eltringham	South Shields	United Kingdom	For Messrs. J. P. Rennoldson & Sons.
7 November	Indore	Merchantman	Messrs. Richardson, Duck & Co.	South Stockton	United Kingdom	For Messrs. Eyre, Evans & Co.
7 November	Polly Woodside	Barque	Workman, Clark & Co	Belfast	United Kingdom	For William J. Woodside & Co.
7 November	Sarah	Steamship	Messrs. A. Hall & Co.	Aberdeen	United Kingdom	For Messrs. William Mollison & Sons.
8 November	David Carll	Schooner	David Carll	City Island, New York	United States	For Allen M. Beebe, Frederick Nelson, Edward Nichols and Jacob Van Name Brothers
9 November	Lahore	Steamship	Messr. William Denny & Bros	Dumbarton	United Kingdom	For private owner.
10 November	Matabele	Steamship	Messrs. Hall, Russell & Co.	Aberdeen	United Kingdom	For Messrs. John T. Rennie, Son & Co.
11 November	Circé	Merchantman	Messrs. Alexander Stephen & Sons	Linthouse	United Kingdom	For A. C. le Quellec.
11 November	Maule	Steamship	Messrs. John Reid & Co.	Port Glasgow	United Kingdom	For Compania Sud-Americana de Vapores.
12 November	Euphrosyne	Full-rigged ship	Messrs. Robert Duncan & Co.	Port Glasgow	United Kingdom	For Colin S. Caird.
12 November	Holland	Steam fishing cutter	Messrs. Earle's Shipbuilding and Engineering Company, Limited	Hull	United Kingdom	For Boston Deep Sea Fishing and Ice Company Limited.
12 November	Witham	Steam fishing cutter	Messrs. Earle's Shipbuilding and Engineering Company, Limited	Hull	United Kingdom	For Boston Deep Sea Fishing and Ice Company Limited.
12 November	Optic	Ferry	Harland & Wolff	Belfast	United Kingdom	For Belfast Steamship Co.
21 November	Andrea Doria	Ruggiero di Lauria-class battleship	Arsenal de La Spezia	La Spezia	United Kingdom	For Regia Marina.
21 November	Brentford	Steamship	Messrs. W. Gray & Co.	West Hartlepool	United Kingdom	For Messrs. Watts, Ward & Co.
21 November	Fulmar	Steam fishing vessel	Messrs. J. M'Kenzie & Co.	Leith	United Kingdom	For J. L. Cunliffe.
22 November	Preston	Steamship	Messrs. M. Pearse & Co.	Stockton-on-Tees	United Kingdom	For Messrs. R. Ropner & Co.
23 November	Unnamed	Hopper dredger	Messrs. Fleming & Ferguson	Paisley	United Kingdom	For Auckland Harbour Board.
24 November	Coot	Steamship	Messrs. W. Gray & Co.	West Hartlepool	United Kingdom	For Cork Steamship Company, Limited.
24 November	Camperdown	Battleship	Portsmouth Dockyard	Portsmouth	United Kingdom	For Royal Navy.
24 November	Orion	Torpedo boat	Schiff-und Maschinenbau-Aktien-Gesellschaft	Kiel	Germany	For Spanish Navy.
24 November	Welcome Home	Schooner	Messrs. Stephen & Forbes	Peterhead	United Kingdom	For John Robertson.
25 November	Curlew	Steamship	Campbeltown Shipbuilding Company	Campbeltown	United Kingdom	For private owner.
25 November	Unnamed	Tug	Usk Shipbuilding Co.	Newport	United Kingdom	For Messrs. Watkins & Co.
26 November	Medusa	Steamship	Messrs. W. H. Potter & Sons	Liverpool	United Kingdom	For Alfred Holt.
November	Jim Morgan	Fishing smack	H. Reynolds	Lowestoft	United Kingdom	For W. Morgan.
3 December	Grand Canto	Steam trawler	Messrs. D. Allan & Co.	Granton	United Kingdom	For Messrs. Nefarrate, Mendzoto & Co.
3 December	Kesteven	Steam trawler	Messrs. Earle's Shipbuilding and Engineering Company	Hull	United Kingdom	For Boston Deep Sea Fishing and Ice Company, Limited.
3 December	Lindsey	Steam trawler	Messrs. Earle's Shipbuilding and Engineering Company	Hull	United Kingdom	For Boston Deep Sea Fishing and Ice Company, Limited.
3 December	Thames	Mersey-class cruiser	Pembroke Dockyard	Pembroke	United Kingdom	For Royal Navy.
5 December	Chicago	Protected cruiser	Delaware River Iron Ship Building and Engine Works	Chester, Pennsylvania	United States	For United States Navy.
5 December	Don	Barque	Messrs. Russell & Co.	Port Glasgow	United Kingdom	For Peter Macfarlane.
7 December	Flora	Steamship	Messrs. Wigham, Richardson & Co.	Low Walker	United Kingdom	For Leon Brodsky.
7 December	Young Donald	Steam fishing vessel	Messrs. Winlo Bros.	South Shields	United Kingdom	For J. M. Scott.
8 December	Blackcock	Tug	Messrs. Laird Bros	Birkenhead	United Kingdom	For Liverpool Screw Towing and Lighterage Company.
8 December	Port Sonnachan	Barque	Messrs. Russell & Co.	Kingston	United Kingdom	For Messrs. Crawford & Rowan.
8 December	Sirenia	full-rigged ship	Messrs. Charles Connell & Co.	Scotstoun	United Kingdom	For private owner.
10 December	Rhine	Sailing ship	Russel & Co	Port Glasgow	United Kingdom	For Nourse Line.
10 December	Toxteth	Merchantman	Messrs. Oswald, Mordaunt & Co.	Southampton	United Kingdom	For private owner.
21 December	Cabo Santa Maria	Steamship	Messrs. Raylton Dixon & Co.	Middlesbrough	United Kingdom	For private owner.
21 December	Mirror	Cable layer	Messrs. Robert Napier & Sons	Govan	United Kingdom	For Eastern Telegraph Company.
22 December	Kaisow	Steamship	Messrs. Joseph L. Thompson & Sons	Sunderland	United Kingdom	For China Shippers' Mutual Steamship Company.
23 December	Archer	Archer-class torpedo cruiser	J & G Thomson	Clydebank	United Kingdom	For Royal Navy.
23 December	British Prince	Steam fishing vessel	Messrs. Marr Bros.	Leith	United Kingdom	For W. H. Storey.
23 December	Dogali	Cruiser	Armstrong Whitworth	Elswick	United Kingdom	For Regia Marina.
23 December	President Meyer	Steamship	Fairfield Shipbuilding & Engineering Co. Ltd.	Fairfield	United Kingdom	For Norddeutscher Lloyd.
24 December	Romulus	Steam fishing trawler	Messrs. Cochrane & Co.	Beverley	United Kingdom	For Messrs. Pickering & Haldane.
24 December	Unnamed	Steam yacht	Culzean Shipbuilding Company	Culzean	United Kingdom	For Andrew Thomson.
25 December	Ilma	Barquentine	Grangemouth Dockyard Company	Grangemouth	United Kingdom	For Messrs. Foster, Alcock & Co.
30 December	Kingfisher	Steamship	John Knox & Co.	South Hylton	United Kingdom	For J. Willcock.
Unknown date	Adler	Torpedo boat	Messrs. Yarrow & Co.	Scotstoun	United Kingdom	For Austro-Hungarian Navy.
Unknown date	Æolus	Steamship	Motala Mekaniska Verkstads AB	Karlshamn	Sweden	For private owner.
Unknown date	Agate	Merchantman	Messrs. Raylton Dixon & Co.	Middlesbrough	United Kingdom	For private owner.
Unknown date	Agnes	Steamship	Motala Mekaniska Verkstads AB	Karlshamn	Sweden	For private owner.
Unknown date	Aladdin	Merchantman	Messrs. Oswald, Mordaunt & Co.	Southampton	United Kingdom	For private owner.
Unknown date	Albatross	Steamboat	Miller, Tuff & Rouse	Hammersmith	United Kingdom	For private owner.
Unknown date	Albert	Steamship	Messrs. Thorneycroft	Chiswick	United Kingdom	For War Office.
Unknown date	Alert	Schooner	Brundrit & Co.	Runcorn	United Kingdom	For private owner.
Unknown date	Alexandra	Steamboat	Messrs. Hawthorn & Co.	Leith	United Kingdom	For private owner.
Unknown date	Alliance	Merchantman	Messrs. R. & J. Evans	Liverpool	United Kingdom	For private owner.
Unknown date	Amazon	Steam yacht	Tankerville Chamberlayne	Southampton	United Kingdom	For Tankerville Chamberlayne.
Unknown date	Amazon	Steam yacht	Messrs. Day, Summers & Co.	Northam	United Kingdom	For private owner.
Unknown date	Ambrosios	Steamship	Stabilimento Tecnico Triestino	Trieste	Trieste	For private owner.
Unknown date	Amherst	Paddle steamer	Messrs. William Denny & Bros	Dumbarton	United Kingdom	For Irrawaddy Flotilla Company.
Unknown date	Amstelstroom	Steamship	Nederlandsche Stoomboot Maatschappij	Fijenoord	Netherlands	For Hollandsche Stoomboot Maatschappij.
Unknown date	Amythyst	Merchantman	Messrs. Raylton Dixon & Co.	Middlesbrough	United Kingdom	For private owner.
Unknown date	Anamba	Merchantman	Messrs. Russell & Co. Ltd	Port Glasgow	United Kingdom	For Peter Denniston & Co.
Unknown date	Andrew Bain	Paddle steamer	Hepple & Co.	North Shields	United Kingdom	For private owner.
Unknown date	Anna	Merchantman	Schiff-und Maschinenbau-Aktien-Gesellschaft	Kiel	Germany	For private owner.
Unknown date	Antonia Lopez	Steamship	Messrs. Lobnitz & Co.	Renfrew	United Kingdom	For Compania de Filipinas.
Unknown date	Aphyouk	Paddle steamer	Messrs. William Denny & Bros	Dumbarton	United Kingdom	For Irrawaddy Flotilla Company.
Unknown date	Ariel	Fishing trawler	Messrs. Cook, Welton & Gemmell	Hull	United Kingdom	For private owner.
Unknown date	Australia	Steamship	Messrs. J. P. Rennoldson & Sons	South Shields	United Kingdom	For private owner.
Unknown date	Barawa	Steamship	Flensburger Schiffbau-Gesellschaft	Kiel	Germany	For private owner.
Unknown date	Bassanio	Fishing trawler	Messrs. Cook, Welton & Gemmell	Hull	United Kingdom	For private owner.
Unknown date	Bastö	Steamship	Akers Mekaniske Verkstad AB	Christiania	Sweden	For private owner.
Unknown date	Batoum	Dredger	John Cockerill	Seraing	Belgium	For private owner.
Unknown date	Bayhadi	Steamship	Messrs. Wigham, Richardson & Co.	Low Walker	United Kingdom	For private owner.
Unknown date	Beau	Merchantman	Messrs. Raylton Dixon & Co.	Middlesbrough	United Kingdom	For private owner.
Unknown date	Belas	Steamship	Motala Mekaniska Verkstads AB	Karlshamn	Sweden	For private owner.
Unknown date	Belle	Merchantman	Messrs. Raylton Dixon & Co.	Middlesbrough	United Kingdom	For private owner.
Unknown date	Beryl	Merchantman	Messrs. Raylton Dixon & Co.	Middlesbrough	United Kingdom	For private owner.
Unknown date	Blucher	Paddle steamer	Hepple & Co.	North Shields	United Kingdom	For private owner.
Unknown date	Bobr	Steamship	W. Crichton & Co	Åbo	(Russian Empire) Grand Duchy of Finland	For private owner.
Unknown date	Bonito	Steam trawler	W. B. Thompson	Dundee	United Kingdom	For Lowestoft Steam Fishing and Carrying Company.
Unknown date	Brake	Steamship	Schiff-und Maschinenbau-Aktien-Gesellschaft	Kiel	Germany	For private owner.
Unknown date	Bristol	Tug	Sam Paegnall	Charleston, South Carolina	United States	For private owner.
Unknown date	Britannia	Steamship	Messrs. Thomas Royden & Sons	Liverpool	United Kingdom	For private owner.
Unknown date	Burrumbeet	Steamship	Messrs. C. S. Swan & Hunter	Wallsend	United Kingdom	For private owner.
Unknown date	Bylgia	Steamboat	Motala Mekaniska Verkstads AB	Karlshamn	Sweden	For private owner.
Unknown date	Cabo Finisterre	Steamship	Palmer's Shipbuilding and Iron Company	Jarrow	United Kingdom	For private owner.
Unknown date	Cadwgan	Barque	William Doxford & Sons	Sunderland	United Kingdom	For R. Thomas & Co.
Unknown date	Cambrian Chieftain	Barque	Osbourne, Graham & Co.	Sunderland	United Kingdom	For Thomas Williams & Co.
Unknown date	Capello	Passenger ship	Messrs. Martens, Olsen & Co.	Bergen	Norway	For private owner.
Unknown date	Captain M'Clure	Steamship	Messrs. Murdoch & Murray	Port Glasgow	United Kingdom	For Michael Murphy Jr.
Unknown date	Carge	Steamship	George Howaldt	Kiel	Germany	For private owner.
Unknown date	Carl Marie von Weber	Steamship	George Howaldt	Kiel	Germany	For private owner.
Unknown date	Celia	Steamship	Sir W. G. Armstrong, Mitchell & Co.	Low Walker	United Kingdom	For private owner.
Unknown date	Ceres	Steamship	Motala Mekaniska Verkstads AB	Karlshamn	Sweden	For private owner.
Unknown date	Clapet IX	Hopper barge	Messrs. Lobnitz & Co.	Renfrew	United Kingdom	For Panama Canal Company.
Unknown date	Clapet X	Hopper barge	Messrs. Lobnitz & Co.	Renfrew	United Kingdom	For Panama Canal Company.
Unknown date	Clotho	Steamboat	Messrs. Edwards & Symes	Cubitt Town	United Kingdom	For private owner.
Unknown date	Colibre	Steamboat	Miller, Tuff & Rouse	Hammersmith	United Kingdom	For private owner.
Unknown date	Composite	Lightship	Messrs. Hill & Sons	Bristol	United Kingdom	For Trinity House.
Unknown date	Condor	Steamship	Hepple & Co.	North Shields	United Kingdom	For private owner.
Unknown date	Condor	Steamship	Koninklijke Fabriek van Stoom en Andere	Amsterdam	Netherlands	For private owner.
Unknown date	Coral	Merchantman	Messrs. Raylton Dixon & Co.	Middlesbrough	United Kingdom	For private owner.
Unknown date	Coronet	Schooner	C. & R. Poillon	Brooklyn, New York	United Kingdom	For Rufus T. Bush.
Unknown date	Corriere-di-Roma	Steamship	Thomas & William Smith	South Shields	United Kingdom	For private owner.
Unknown date	Crab	Steamship	Messrs. William Gray & Co.	West Hartlepool	United Kingdom	For Cork Steamship Company.
Unknown date	Cranz	Steamship	George Howaldt	Kiel	Germany	For private owner.
Unknown date	C. Rice	Fishing vessel	Albert Dock Shipwright Co. Ltd.	Hull	United Kingdom	For John Munby.
Unknown date	Cuthona	Merchantman	Richardson, Duck & Co.	Stockton-on-Tees	United Kingdom	For private owner.
Unknown date	Cyclop	Steamship	Motala Mekaniska Verkstads AB	Karlshamn	Sweden	For private owner.
Unknown date	Dart	Steam trawler	Messrs. Hawthorn & Co.	Leith	United Kingdom	For private owner.
Unknown date	Denbighshire	Steamship	Messrs. C. S. Swan & Hunter	Wallsend	United Kingdom	For Messrs. D. J. Jenkins & Co.
Unknown date	Destorro	Steamship	Blohm & Voss	Hamburg	Germany	For private owner.
Unknown date	Devonia	Fishing trawler	John Bell	Grimsby	United Kingdom	For John Guzzwell.
Unknown date	Dikili	Coaster	W. Allsup & Sons Ltd.	Preston	United Kingdom	For Essayan, Shahum & Co.
Unknown date	Dolphin	Steam trawler	W. B. Thompson	Dundee	United Kingdom	For Lowestoft Steam Carrying and Fishing Company.
Unknown date	Douglas	Steamboat	McArthur & Co.	Abbotsinch	United Kingdom	For private owner.
Unknown date	Dragnear 5	Steamship	Messrs. Lobnitz & Co.	Renfrew	United Kingdom	For Compagnie Fives-Lille.
Unknown date	Dragne XIX	Dredger	Messrs. Lobnitz & Co.	Renfrew	United Kingdom	For Panama Canal Company.
Unknown date	Dragoman	Steamship	Sir W. G. Armstrong, Mitchell & Co.	Low Walker	United Kingdom	For private owner.
Unknown date	Drymen	Steamship	Andrew Leslie & Co	Hebburn-on-Tyne	United Kingdom	For private owner.
Unknown date	Duchess	Paddle steamer	Messrs. Lawson & Eltringham	location	United Kingdom	For J. T. Davison.
Unknown date	Eagle	Steamship	Boolds, Sharer & Co	Sunderland	United Kingdom	For private owner.
Unknown date	Eagle	Steamship	W. B. Thompson	Whiteinch	United Kingdom	For private owner.
Unknown date	Earl of Pembroke	Steam launch	Culzean Shipbuilding Company	Culzean	United Kingdom	For Sir Andrew Walker.
Unknown date	El Atrivado	Steam launch	Messrs. Ramage & Ferguson	Leith	United Kingdom	For Church Missionary Society.
Unknown date	Elbing	Steamship	Ferdinand Schichau	Elbing	Germany	For private owner.
Unknown date	Elcano	Gunboat	Arsenal de La Carraca	Cádiz	United Kingdom	For Spanish Navy.
Unknown date	Eleanor Maria M.	Fishing trawler	Messrs. Cook, Welton & Gemmell	Hull	United Kingdom	For private owner.
Unknown date	Elf	Steamboat	W. S. Cumming	Monkland Canal	United Kingdom	For private owner.
Unknown date	Elfin	Steamboat	Miller, Tuff & Rouse	Hammersmith	United Kingdom	For private owner.
Unknown date	Ellen	Steamship	Motala Mekaniska Verkstads AB	Karlshamn	Sweden	For private owner.
Unknown date	Emerald	Merchantman	Messrs. Raylton Dixon & Co.	Middlesbrough	United Kingdom	For private owner.
Unknown date	Empress	Tug	Messrs. Cox & Co.	Falmouth	United Kingdom	For P. Thomas.
Unknown date	Ernst Gunther	Steamship	Flensburger Schiffbau-Gesellschaft	Flensburg	United Kingdom	For "Steamship Company Flensburgh-Ekensund".
Unknown date	Eveline	Steamship	Messrs. C. S. Swan & Hunter	Wallsend	United Kingdom	For private owner.
Unknown date	Expedit	Steamship	Messrs. Craig, Taylor & Co.	Stockton-on-Tees	United Kingdom	For private owner.
Unknown date	Falke	Torpedo boat	Messrs. Yarrow	Scotstoun	United Kingdom	For Austro-Hungarian Navy.
Unknown date	Falke	Steamship	Ferdinand Schichau	Elbing	Germany	For private owner.
Unknown date	Falken	Steamship	W. Crichton & Co	Åbo	(Russian Empire) Grand Duchy of Finland	For private owner.
Unknown date	Falsterbö	Steamship	Kockums Mekaniske Verkstad AB	Malmö	Sweden	For private owner.
Unknown date	Fifeshire	Merchantman	Messrs. Russell & Co.	Port Glasgow	United Kingdom	For Thomas Law & Co.
Unknown date	Figaro	Steamship	P. Smit Jr.	Slikkerveer	Netherlands	For private owner.
Unknown date	Firefly	Tug	W. Allsup & Sons Ltd.	Preston	United Kingdom	For Board of Trade.
Unknown date	Fire Queen	Fireboat	S. P. Austin & Son	Sunderland	United Kingdom	For Wear Watch Commissioners.
Unknown date	Flambro	Steamship	Palmer's Shipbuilding and Iron Company	Jarrow	United Kingdom	For private owner.
Unknown date	Flora	Merchantman	Messrs. Mordey, Carney & Co. (Limited)	Newport	United Kingdom	For private owner.
Unknown date	Florence	Yacht	Grangemouth Dockyard Company	Grangemouth	United Kingdom	For private owner.
Unknown date	Flying Fish	Steamship	Messrs. J. P. Rennoldson & Sons	South Shields	United Kingdom	For private owner.
Unknown date	Flying Fox	Steamship	Messrs. J. P. Rennoldson & Sons	South Shields	United Kingdom	For private owner.
Unknown date	Formosa	Steamship	Messrs. Wigham, Richardson & Co.	Low Walker	United Kingdom	For private owner.
Unknown date	Fortuna	Steamship	H. F. Ulrichs	Vegesack	Germany	For private owner.
Unknown date	Four Winds	Merchantman	Palmer's Shipbuilding and Iron Company	Jarrow	United Kingdom	For private owner.
Unknown date	Foxhall	Steamship	Messrs. Wigham, Richardson & Co.	Low Walker	United Kingdom	For private owner.
Unknown date	Freetown	Steam launch	Cochran & Co.	Birkenhead	United Kingdom	For private owner.
Unknown date	Freia	Steamship	Blohm & Voss	Hamburg	Germany	For private owner.
Unknown date	Frobisher	Merchantman	Messrs. Raylton Dixon & Co.	Middlesbrough	United Kingdom	For private owner.
Unknown date	Fuebracho	Steamship	Messrs. John Fullarton & Co.	Paisley	United Kingdom	For private owner.
Unknown date	Garnet	Merchantman	Messrs. Raylton Dixon & Co.	Middlesbrough	United Kingdom	For private owner.
Unknown date	Garrick	Steamship	Andrew Leslie & Co	Hebburn-on-Tyne	United Kingdom	For private owner.
Unknown date	Geiranger	Steamship	Messrs. Martens, Olsen & Co.	Bergen	Norway	For private owner.
Unknown date	George Rennie	Paddle steamer		Middlesex	United Kingdom	For private owner.
Unknown date	Gertrud Woerman	Steamship	Stettiner Maschinenbau	Stettin	Germany	For private owner.
Unknown date	Giovanni Bausan	Cruiser	Sir W. G. Armstrong, Mitchell & Co.	Elswick	United Kingdom	For Regia Marina.
Unknown date	Gleaner	Steamship	Messrs. J. P. Rennoldson & Sons	South Shields	United Kingdom	For private owner.
Unknown date	Glenericht	Full-rigged ship	Messrs. Thomas Royden & Sons	Liverpool	United Kingdom	For private owner.
Unknown date	Good and Blanchard	Fishing trawler	Messrs. Cook, Welton & Gemmell	Hull	United Kingdom	For private owner.
Unknown date	Goshawk	Steamboat	Miller, Tuff & Rouse	Hammersmith	United Kingdom	For private owner.
Unknown date	Goudvink	Steamship	P. Smit Jr.	Slikkerveer	Netherlands	For private owner.
Unknown date	Gran-Canto	Steamship	D. Allan & Co.	Grantown	United Kingdom	For private owner.
Unknown date	Grassendale	Merchantman	R. Williamson & Son	Workington	United Kingdom	For private owner.
Unknown date	Griffin	Steamship	Messrs. Blackwood & Gordon	Port Glasgow	United Kingdom	For William Arrol & Co.
Unknown date	Grossherzog Friedrich-Franz	Steamship	Ferdinand Schichau	Elbing	Germany	For private owner.
Unknown date	Haiphong	Steamship	Messrs. Wigham, Richardson & Co.	Low Walker	United Kingdom	For Douglass Steamship Company.
Unknown date	Hai Phong	Steamship	Messageries Maritimes	La Ciotat	France	For Messageries Maritimes.
Unknown date	Hajeen	Steamship	Sir W. G. Armstrong, Mitchell & Co.	Low Walker	United Kingdom	For private owner.
Unknown date	Handy	Wherry	Messrs. Schlesinger, Davis & Co.	Wallsend	United Kingdom	For private owner.
Unknown date	Harden	Steamship	Messrs. Martens, Olsen & Co.	Bergen	Norway	For private owner.
Unknown date	Hedwig	Merchantman	George Howaldt	Kiel	Germany	For private owner.
Unknown date	Hindo	Steamship	Akers Mekaniske Verkstad AB	Christiania	Sweden	For private owner.
Unknown date	Hispania	Steamship	Tyne Iron Shipbuilding Company	Willington Quay	United Kingdom	For Messrs. H. Clarkson & Co.
Unknown date	Hornet	Steamboat	Waite & Son	West Cowes	United Kingdom	For private owner.
Unknown date	Howard	Merchantman	Messrs. Raylton Dixon & Co.	Middlesbrough	United Kingdom	For private owner.
Unknown date	Hyacinth	Steamboat	Miller, Tuff & Rouse	Hammersmith	United Kingdom	For private owner.
Unknown date	Ika	Steamship	Stabilimento Tecnico Triestino	Trieste	Trieste	For private owner.
Unknown date	India	Dredger	Messrs. Fleming & Ferguson	Paisley	United Kingdom	For East Indian Railway Company.
Unknown date	Industrie	Steamship	L. Smit en Zoon	Kinderdijk	Netherlands	For Badische Schrauben Dampfschiffahrts-Gesellschaft.
Unknown date	Iola	Steamboat		Hammersley Inlet	(United States) Washington Territory	For Edwin Miller.
Unknown date	Iris	Steamship	A. Leslie and Company	Newcastle upon Tyne	United Kingdom	For private owner.
Unknown date	Iron Will	Merchantman	Messrs. Raylton Dixon & Co.	Middlesbrough	United Kingdom	For private owner.
Unknown date	Irrawaddy	Steam trawler	Messrs. Cook, Welton & Gemmell	Hull	United Kingdom	For George Beeching.
Unknown date	Isle of Georgia	Steamship	Messrs. John Readhead & Sons	South Shields	United Kingdom	For private owner.
Unknown date	Jarl	Steamship	"Elsinore Iron Shipbuilding & Engineering Co."	Helsingør	Denmark	For private owner.
Unknown date	Java	Cruiser	Nederlandsche Stoomboot Maatschappij	Rotterdam	Netherlands	For Royal Netherlands Navy.
Unknown date	Johan II	Steamship	P. Smit Jr.	Slikkerveer	Netherlands	For private owner.
Unknown date	Johnny	Steamboat	Miller, Tuff & Rouse	Hammersmith	United Kingdom	For private owner.
Unknown date	J. M. Smith	Steamship	Short Bros.	Sunderland	United Kingdom	For James Westoll Line.
Unknown date	Kaiser	Merchantman	Messrs. Raylton Dixon & Co.	Middlesbrough	United Kingdom	For private owner.
Unknown date	Karli	Steamship	Grangemouth Dockyard Company	Grangemouth	United Kingdom	For private owner.
Unknown date	Kaspii	Steamboat	Motala Mekaniska Verkstads AB	Karlshamn	Sweden	For private owner.
Unknown date	Kiel	Steamship	George Howaldt	Kiel	Germany	For private owner.
Unknown date	Kimberley	Troopship	Messrs. William Hamilton & Co.	Port Glasgow	United Kingdom	For Messrs. Henry Ellis & Sons.
Unknown date	Kingfisher	Steamship	John Knox & Co. Ltd	South Hylton	United Kingdom	For private owner.
Unknown date	Kohilla	Merchantman	Messrs. Russell & Co.	Port Glasgow	United Kingdom	For private owner.
Unknown date	Königsberg	Steamship	Ferdinand Schichau	Elbing	Germany	For private owner.
Unknown date	Knight Errant	Steamship	Palmer's Shipbuilding and Iron Company (Limited)	Jarrow	United Kingdom	For Messrs. Greenshields, Cowie & Co.
Unknown date	Knight of St. George	Tug	Joseph Brewin & F. B. Salmon	Birkenhead	United Kingdom	For Knight of St. George Tug Co. Ltd.
Unknown date	Knight of St. John	Tug	Palmers Shipbuilding and Iron Company (Limited)	Jarrow	United Kingdom	For Messrs. Greenshields, Cowie & Co.
Unknown date	Kourier	Steamship	Ferdinand Schichau	Elbing	Germany	For private owner.
Unknown date	Lägg Ut	Steamship	Kockums Mekaniske Verkstad AB	Malmö	Sweden	For private owner.
Unknown date	L'Adriatico	Steamship	Stabilimento Tecnico Triestino	Trieste	Trieste	For private owner.
Unknown date	Laivada	Steamship	Messrs. William Denny & Bros.	Dumbarton	United Kingdom	For private owner.
Unknown date	Lanvikey	Steamship	Messrs. Martens, Olsen & Co.	Bergen	Norway	For private owner.
Unknown date	Laurel	Steamboat	Miller, Tuff & Rouse	Hammersmith	United Kingdom	For private owner.
Unknown date	Laxevaag	Steamship	Messrs. Martens, Olsen & Co.	Bergen	Norway	For private owner.
Unknown date	Le Glorieux	Steamship	D. Allan & Co.	Grantown	United Kingdom	For private owner.
Unknown date	Lelamon	Steamship	Messrs. Scott & Co.	Greenock	United Kingdom	For private owner.
Unknown date	Leonard Brown	Paddle steamer	Hepple & Co.	North Shields	United Kingdom	For private owner.
Unknown date	Lesum	Steamship	H. F. Ulrichs	Vegesack	Germany	For private owner.
Unknown date	Lilian	Steamship	W. B. Thompson	Whiteinch	United Kingdom	For private owner.
Unknown date	Lily	Steam yacht	Ross & Duncan	Govan	United Kingdom	For Board of Customs.
Unknown date	Lily	Steamboat	W. S. Cumming	Monkland Canal	United Kingdom	For private owner.
Unknown date	Limena	Merchantman	S. P. Austin & Son	Sunderland	United Kingdom	For W. Nichol & Co.
Unknown date	Lizzie	Steamboat	Messrs. Hawthorns & Co.	Leith	United Kingdom	For private owner.
Unknown date	Lofoten	Steamship	Akers Mekaniske Verkstad AB	Christiania	Sweden	For private owner.
Unknown date	Lohara	Steamship	Messrs. William Denny & Bros.	Dumbarton	United Kingdom	For private owner.
Unknown date	Lumache	Merchantman	Messrs. William Gray & Co.	Hartlepool	United Kingdom	For private owner.
Unknown date	Luna	Merchantman	Schiff-und Maschinenbau-Aktien-Gesellschaft	Kiel	Germany	For private owner.
Unknown date	Lysekil	Steamship	Motala Mekaniska Verkstads AB	Karlshamn	Sweden	For private owner.
Unknown date	Madeline	Yacht	Culzean Shipbuilding Company	Culzean	United Kingdom	For Andrew Thomson.
Unknown date	Mahseer	Steamboat	Miller, Tuff & Rouse	Hammersmith	United Kingdom	For private owner.
Unknown date	Maitland	Steamship	John Knox & Co. Ltd	South Hylton	United Kingdom	For M. Sverljuga & Co.
Unknown date	Mantis	Tug	W. Allsup & Sons Ltd.	Preston	United Kingdom	For Board of Trade.
Unknown date	Mary Jane	Ketch	George W. Brown & Sons	Hull	United Kingdom	For Henry Maddick.
Unknown date	Matthias Stinnes V	Steamship	Nederlandsche Stoomboot Maatschappij	Rotterdam	Netherlands	For private owner.
Unknown date	Mazur	Steamship	Ferdinand Schichau	Elbing	Germany	For private owner.
Unknown date	Melati	Merchantman	Campbell, Bowstead & Co.	Newcastle upon Tyne	United Kingdom	For private owner.
Unknown date	Mequinez	Steamship	James Laing	Deptford	United Kingdom	For Mersey Steamship Co.
Unknown date	Merlin	Steam trawler	Messrs. J. M'Kenzie & Co.	Leith	United Kingdom	For private owner.
Unknown date	M. G. Melchior	Steamship	Burmeister & Wain	Copenhagen	Denmark	For private owner.
Unknown date	Michael	Steamship	W. Crichton & Co	Åbo	(Russian Empire) Grand Duchy of Finland	For private owner.
Unknown date	Miguel M. Pinillos	Steamship	James Laing	Deptford	United Kingdom	For Don Antonio Martinez Pinillos.
Unknown date	Miltiades	Merchantman	James Laing	Deptford	United Kingdom	For Thomas Scott.
Unknown date	Mindoon	Paddle steamer	Messrs. William Denny & Bros	Dumbarton	United Kingdom	For Irrawaddy Flotilla Company.
Unknown date	Momein	Steamship	Messrs. William Denny & Bros.	Dumbarton	United Kingdom	For private owner.
Unknown date	Mootiya	Steamship	Campbell, Bowstead & Co.	Newcastle upon Tyne	United Kingdom	For private owner.
Unknown date	Morgenröthe	Steamship	Ferdinand Schichau	Elbing	Germany	For private owner.
Unknown date	Mosquito	Tug	W. Allsup & Sons Ltd.	Preston	United Kingdom	For Board of Trade.
Unknown date	Mosquito	Steamboat	Miller, Tuff & Rouse	Hammersmith	United Kingdom	For private owner.
Unknown date	Möwe	Merchantman	Schiff-und Maschinenbau Aktien Gesellschaft Germania	Kiel	Germany	For Norddeutsche Lloyd.
Unknown date	Muthwillig	Steamship	Ferdinand Schichau	Elbing	Germany	For private owner.
Unknown date	Narrana	Steamship	Messrs. Martens, Olsen & Co.	Bergen	Norway	For private owner.
Unknown date	Nereur	Steamship	"Elsinore Iron Shipbuilding & Engineering Co."	Helsingør	Denmark	For private owner.
Unknown date	Niolot	Steamship	George Howaldt	Kiel	Germany	For private owner.
Unknown date	N. I. S. N. Co	Steamship	James Laing	Deptford	United Kingdom	For private owner.
Unknown date	Nissan	Steamship	Kockums Mekaniske Verkstad AB	Malmö	Sweden	For private owner.
Unknown date	Norden	Steamship	Boolds, Sharer & Co.	Sunderland	United Kingdom	For Rederi AB Svenska Lloyd.
Unknown date	Nordfriesland	Steamship	George Howaldt	Kiel	Germany	For private owner.
Unknown date	Norman	Steamship	Messrs. Cox & Co.	Falmouth	United Kingdom	For private owner.
Unknown date	Norra Finland	Steamship	Motala Mekaniska Verkstads AB	Karlshamn	Sweden	For private owner.
Unknown date	Northern Hay	Merchantman	James Laing	Deptford	United Kingdom	For private owner.
Unknown date	Nyoung-don	Paddle steamer	Messrs. William Denny & Bros	Dumbarton	United Kingdom	For Irrawaddy Flotilla Company.
Unknown date	Obdenburg	Steamship	Stettiner Maschinenbau	Stettin	Germany	For private owner.
Unknown date	Ochtertyre	Barque	Messrs. R. Duncan & Co.	Port Glasgow	United Kingdom	For Hugh Hogarth.
Unknown date	Octa	Steamship	James Laing	Deptford	United Kingdom	For C. M. Norwood & Co.
Unknown date	Octa	Steamship	Flensburger Schiffbau-Gesellschaft	Kiel	Germany	For private owner.
Unknown date	Olinda	Steam launch	Messrs. Cochran & Co.	Birkenhead	United Kingdom	For Messrs. Millward, Bradbury & Co.
Unknown date	Omni	Steamship	W. Crichton & Co	Åbo	(Russian Empire) Grand Duchy of Finland	For private owner.
Unknown date	Onyx	Merchantman	Messrs. Raylton Dixon & Co.	Middlesbrough	United Kingdom	For private owner.
Unknown date	Opal	Merchantman	Messrs. Raylton Dixon & Co.	Middlesbrough	United Kingdom	For private owner.
Unknown date	Opal	Steamboat	Waite & Son	West Cowes	United Kingdom	For private owner.
Unknown date	Orlando	Steamship	Sir W. G. Armstrong, Mitchell & Co.	Low Walker	United Kingdom	For private owner.
Unknown date	Orrik	Steamship	"Elsinore Iron Shipbuilding & Engineering Co."	Helsingør	Denmark	For private owner.
Unknown date	Ouse Hopper No. 1	Steamship	William Dobson & Co.	Newcastle upon Tyne	United Kingdom	For private owner.
Unknown date	Ouse Hopper No. 2	Steamship	William Dobson & Co.	Newcastle upon Tyne	United Kingdom	For private owner.
Unknown date	Ovingham	Steamship	Andrew Leslie & Co	Hebburn-on-Tyne	United Kingdom	For private owner.
Unknown date	Palala	Steamship	James Laing	Deptford	United Kingdom	For Bullard, King & Co.
Unknown date	Palameo	Steamship	Messrs. Andrew Leslie & Co.	Hebburn	United Kingdom	For Ocean Steamship Company.
Unknown date	Pallas	Steamship	Motala Mekaniska Verkstads AB	Karlshamn	Sweden	For private owner.
Unknown date	Panay	Gunboat	Cavite Navy Yard	Manila	(Spain) Spanish East Indies	For Spanish Navy.
Unknown date	Paposo	Steamship	Blohm & Voss	Hamburg	Germany	For private owner.
Unknown date	Partout	Steamship	P. Smit Jr.	Slikkerveer	Netherlands	For private owner.
Unknown date	Pasvig	Steamship	Akers Mekaniske Verkstad AB	Christiania	Sweden	For private owner.
Unknown date	Patagonia	Steamship	Stabilimento Tecnico Triestino	Trieste	Trieste	For private owner.
Unknown date	Pearl	Merchantman	Messrs. Raylton Dixon & Co.	Middlesbrough	United Kingdom	For private owner.
Unknown date	Perseverance	Steam fishing vessel	Messrs. J. M'Kenzie & Co.	Leith	United Kingdom	For private owner.
Unknown date	Pescador	Steam launch	Messrs. Cochran & Son	Birkenhead	United Kingdom	For G. Petrie.
Unknown date	Phoenix	Steam yacht	Messrs. Fleming & Ferguson	Paisley	United Kingdom	For Messrs. Fleming & Ferguson.
Unknown date	Pioneer	Schooner		Marcus Hook, Pennsylvania	United States	For private owner.
Unknown date	Pius	Steamship	Blohm & Voss	Hamburg	Germany	For private owner.
Unknown date	Plover	Fishing trawler	Messrs. Cook, Welton & Gemmell	Hull	United Kingdom	For private owner.
Unknown date	Pointer	Merchantman	Culzean Shipbuilding Company	Culzean	United Kingdom	For Marquis of Ailsa.
Unknown date	Polar Light	Steam lighter	Messrs. Scott & Co.	Bowling	United Kingdom	For private owner.
Unknown date	President do Ceara	Tug	Cochran & Co.	Birkenhead	United Kingdom	For private owner.
Unknown date	Primula	Steamship	John Blumer & Co	Sunderland	United Kingdom	For J. Blumer & Co.
Unknown date	Princess Josephine	Steamship	John Cockerill	Seraing	Belgium	For private owner.
Unknown date	Prins Albert de Belgique	Steamship	John Cockerill	Seraing	Belgium	For private owner.
Unknown date	Progresso	Steamboat	Messrs. Edwards & Symes	Cubitt Town	United Kingdom	For private owner.
Unknown date	Prometheus	Steamship	Andrew Leslie & Co	Hebburn-on-Tyne	United Kingdom	For Ocean Steamship Companyt.
Unknown date	Prozeworski	Steamship	Stettiner Maschinenbau	Stettin	Germany	For private owner.
Unknown date	Pröven	Steamship	Burmeister & Wain	Copenhagen	Denmark	For private owner.
Unknown date	Русъ	Steamship	Stabilimento Tecnico Triestino	Trieste	Trieste	For private owner.
Unknown date	Quarta	Steam trawler	Messrs. Hawthorns & Co.	Leith	United Kingdom	For private owner.
Unknown date	Queen City	Steamboat	Melancthon Thompson	Toronto	Canada	For private owner.
Unknown date	Queen of the Bay	Steamboat	W. Allsup & Sons Ltd.	Preston	United Kingdom	For James Gardner.
Unknown date	Raleigh	Merchantman	Messrs. Raylton Dixon & Co.	Middlesbrough	United Kingdom	For private owner.
Unknown date	Ralkgrund	Steamship	Kockums Mekaniske Verkstad AB	Malmö	Sweden	For private owner.
Unknown date	Red Rose	Tug	Messrs. E. Finch & Co., Limited	Chepstow	United Kingdom	For David Guy.
Unknown date	Renonquein	Tug	John Cockerill	Seraing	Belgium	For private owner.
Unknown date	Rheinland	Cargo ship	H. Hespe	Brake	Germany	For Rabien & Statlander.
Unknown date	Rialto	Steamship	Stabilimento Tecnico Triestino	Trieste	Trieste	For private owner.
Unknown date	Richard Boston	Fishing trawler	John Bell	Grimsby	United Kingdom	For Tom C. Gray.
Unknown date	Richard Kelsall	Steamship	Messrs. John Readhead & Sons	South Shields	United Kingdom	For private owner.
Unknown date	Rosa	Schooner	Messrs. Workman, Clarke & Co.	Belfast	United Kingdom	For Belfast Harbour Commissioners.
Unknown date	Rosalind	Steam launch	Cochran & Co.	Birkenhead	United Kingdom	For private owner.
Unknown date	Rosshead	Merchantman	London and Glasgow Engineering and Iron Shipbuilding Co.	Govan	United Kingdom	For private owner.
Unknown date	Rota	Steamship	Flensburger Schiffbau-Gesellschaft	Kiel	Germany	For private owner.
Unknown date	Rush	Revenue cutter	Hall Bros.	San Francisco, California	United States	For United States Revenue Cutter Service.
Unknown date	Rynbeurtvaart I	Merchantman	Koninklijke Fabriek van Stoom en Andere	Amsterdam	Netherlands	For private owner.
Unknown date	Rynbeurtvaart III	Merchantman	Koninklijke Fabriek van Stoom en Andere	Amsterdam	Netherlands	For private owner.
Unknown date	Rynbeurtvaart V	Merchantman	Koninklijke Fabriek van Stoom en Andere	Amsterdam	Netherlands	For private owner.
Unknown date	Rynbeurtvaart VII	Merchantman	Koninklijke Fabriek van Stoom en Andere	Amsterdam	Netherlands	For private owner.
Unknown date	Samuel & Ann	Fishing smack	Messrs. Cottingham Bros.	Goole	United Kingdom	For private owner.
Unknown date	San José	Steamboat	Messrs. Edwards & Symes	Cubitt Town	United Kingdom	For private owner.
Unknown date	Sapphire	Merchantman	Messrs. Raylton Dixon & Co.	Middlesbrough	United Kingdom	For private owner.
Unknown date	Satae	Steamship	P. Smit Jr.	Slikkerveer	Netherlands	For private owner.
Unknown date	Secunda	Steamship	D. Allan & Co.	Grantown	United Kingdom	For private owner.
Unknown date	Shannon	Steamship	Messrs. Wigham, Richardson & Co.	Low Walker	United Kingdom	For private owner.
Unknown date	Sirius	Steamship	Flensburger Schiffbau-Gesellschaft	Kiel	Germany	For private owner.
Unknown date	Sitina	Steamship	Messrs. Wigham, Richardson & Co.	Low Walker	United Kingdom	For private owner.
Unknown date	Scottish Glens	Merchantman	Messrs. Oswald, Mordaunt & Co.	Southampton	United Kingdom	For private owner.
Unknown date	Sea Prince	Steamship	Messrs. Stothert & Co.	Bristol	United Kingdom	For private owner.
Unknown date	Sepetiba	Steamship	Stettiner Maschinenbau	Stettin	Germany	For private owner.
Unknown date	Seth Low	Fireboat			United States	For Brooklyn Fire Department.
Unknown date	Shah	Merchantman	Messrs. Raylton Dixon & Co.	Middlesbrough	United Kingdom	For private owner.
Unknown date	Shieldrake	Steamship	W. Thompson	Dundee	United Kingdom	For Cork Steamship Company.
Unknown date	Siloia	Steamship	Reiherstieg Schiffswerfte & Maschinenfabrik	Hamburg	Germany	For private owner.
Unknown date	Södermanland	Steamship	Motala Mekaniska Verkstads AB	Karlshamn	Sweden	For private owner.
Unknown date	Spencer Walpole	Steamship	Messrs. J. P. Rennoldson & Sons	South Shields	United Kingdom	For private owner.
Unknown date	Spring Hill	Steamship	Tyne Iron Shipbuilding Company	Willington Quay	United Kingdom	For private owner.
Unknown date	Sprite	Steamboat	W. S. Cumming	Monkland Canal	United Kingdom	For private owner.
Unknown date	Squid	Sailboat	Miller, Tuff & Rouse	Hammersmith	United Kingdom	For private owner.
Unknown date	Star	Lightship	Messrs. R. & J. Evans	Liverpool	United Kingdom	For private owner.
Unknown date	Stark	Steamboat	Akers Mekaniske Verkstad AB	Christiania	Sweden	For private owner.
Unknown date	Stiletto	Torpedo boat	Herreshoff Manufacturing Co.	Bristol, Rhode Island	United States	For United States Navy
Unknown date	Stockholm	Steamship	Reiherstieg Schiffswerfte & Maschinenfabrik	Hamburg	Germany	For private owner.
Unknown date	Strandt Stralsund	Steamship	George Howaldt	Kiel	Germany	For private owner.
Unknown date	Sultan	Merchantman	Messrs. Raylton Dixon & Co.	Middlesbrough	United Kingdom	For private owner.
Unknown date	Suriname	Steamship	P. Smit Jr.	Slikkerveer	Netherlands	For private owner.
Unknown date	Surprise	Hopper dredger	Messrs. William Simons & Co.	Renfrew	United Kingdom	For Enterprise Serrure.
Unknown date	Svanen	Steamship	"Elsinore Iron Shipbuilding & Engineering Co."	Helsingør	Denmark	For private owner.
Unknown date	Sviet	Steamship	Motala Mekaniska Verkstads AB	Karlshamn	Sweden	For private owner.
Unknown date	Swift	Torpedo boat	J. Samuel White	Cowes	United Kingdom	For J. Samuel White.
Unknown date	Swift	Merchantman	Union Co-operative Shipbuilding Society, Limitged	Blyth	United Kingdom	For private owner.
Unknown date	Swiftsure	Steam launch	Cochran & Co.	Birkenhead	United Kingdom	For private owner.
Unknown date	Tamar	Steamship	Messrs. Blackwood & Gordon	Port Glasgow	United Kingdom	For William Arrol & Co.
Unknown date	Tantallon	Steamboat	Messrs. Hawthorns & Co.	Leith	United Kingdom	For private owner.
Unknown date	Tantalus	Merchantman	Messrs. Mordey, Carney & Co. (Limited)	Newport	United Kingdom	For private owner.
Unknown date	Tava	Steamship	Nederlandsche Stoomboot Maatschappij	Rotterdam	Netherlands	For private owner.
Unknown date	T. C. Julius	Merchantman	Rostocker Actiengesellschaft für Schiff & Maschinenbau	Rostock	Germany	For private owner.
Unknown date	Telegraph	Steamship	George Howaldt	Kiel	Germany	For private owner.
Unknown date	Tertia	Steamship	D. Allan & Co.	Grantown	United Kingdom	For private owner.
Unknown date	The Fay	Streamship	Messrs. Newall & Co.	Bristol	United Kingdom	For private owner.
Unknown date	Thrasher	Steamboat	Waite & Son	West Cowes	United Kingdom	For private owner.
Unknown date	Thumbia	Steamship	Barrow Shipbuilding Company	Barrow-in-Furness	United Kingdom	For private owner.
Unknown date	Tomah	Steamship	Messrs. William Denny & Bros.	Dumbarton	United Kingdom	For private owner.
Unknown date	Tomsk	Steamship	Burmeister & Wain	Copenhagen	Denmark	For private owner.
Unknown date	Topaz	Merchantman	Messrs. Raylton Dixon & Co.	Middlesbrough	United Kingdom	For private owner.
Unknown date	Trafik	Steamship	Motala Mekaniska Verkstads AB	Karlshamn	Sweden	For private owner.
Unknown date	Treneglos	Steamship	Messrs. John Readhead & Sons	South Shields	United Kingdom	For private owner.
Unknown date	Tunstall	Steamship	Short Bros.	Sunderland	United Kingdom	For J. S. Barwick.
Unknown date	Turquoise	Merchantman	Messrs. Raylton Dixon & Co.	Middlesbrough	United Kingdom	For private owner.
Unknown date	Unique	Ketch	George W. Brown & Sons	Hull	United Kingdom	For William J. Robins.
Unknown date	Ursula	Barque	Hermann Friedrich Ulrichs	Bremen	Germany	For D. H. Wätjen & Co.
Unknown date	U. V. W.	Steamship	P. Smit Jr.	Slikkerveer	Netherlands	For private owner.
Unknown date	Valetta	Steam yacht	Ross & Duncan	Govan	United Kingdom	For private owner.
Unknown date	Ventura	Full-rigged ship	Messrs. A. M'Millan & Son	Dumbarton	United Kingdom	For Scotia Shipping Company.
Unknown date	Viceroy	Merchantman	Messrs. Raylton Dixon & Co.	Middlesbrough	United Kingdom	For private owner.
Unknown date	Victor Hugo	Steamship	Hepple & Co.	North Shields	United Kingdom	For private owner.
Unknown date	Victory	Steamboat	Messrs. Edwards & Symes	Cubitt Town	United Kingdom	For private owner.
Unknown date	Ville d'Anvers	Aviso	John Cockerill	Seraing	Belgium	For Belgian Navy.
Unknown date	'Vrainerun'	Steamboat	Stettiner Maschinenbau	Stettin	Germany	For private owner.
Unknown date	Vrönig Chrissian	Steamship	Stettiner Maschinenbau	Stettin	Germany	For private owner.
Unknown date	Vruifer Wilhelm	Steamship	Stettiner Maschinenbau	Stettin	Germany	For private owner.
Unknown date	Waddington	Cigar boat	Cochran & Co.	Birkenhead	United Kingdom	For private owner.
Unknown date	Warrior	Tug	W. Allsup & Sons Ltd.	Preston	United Kingdom	For Leeds and Liverpool Canal Co.
Unknown date	Wavertree	Full-rigged ship		southampton	United Kingdom	For R. W. Leyland & Co.
Unknown date	Wega	Steamship	Flensburger Schiffbau-Gesellschaft	Kiel	Germany	For private owner.
Unknown date	Westerland	Steamship	George Howaldt	Kiel	Germany	For private owner.
Unknown date	Westgate	Merchantman	Messrs. R. & J. Evans	Liverpool	United Kingdom	For private owner.
Unknown date	Wetka	Steamship	Ferdinand Schichau	Elbing	Germany	For private owner.
Unknown date	Winifred	Steamship	Sir W. G. Armstrong, Mitchell & Co.	Low Walker	United Kingdom	For private owner.
Unknown date	Woodcock	Steamship	Messrs. John Readhead & Sons	South Shields	United Kingdom	For private owner.
Unknown date	Wrigley	Steamship		Slave River	Canada	For Hudson's Bay Company.
Unknown date	Yomah	Paddle steamer	Messrs. William Denny & Bros	Dumbarton	United Kingdom	For Irrawaddy Flotilla Company.
Unknown date	Young Lizzie	Fishing trawler	John Bell	Grimsby	United Kingdom	For Charles Cook.
Unknown date	No. 2	Lightship	Messrs. Hill & Sons	Bristol	United Kingdom	For Trinity House.
Unknown date	No. 3	Hopper dredger	Messrs. William Simons & Co.	Renfrew	United Kingdom	For Belfast Harbour Commissioners.
Unknown date	No. 3	Lightship	Messrs. Hill & Sons	Bristol	United Kingdom	For Trinity House.
Unknown date	No. 19	Barge	H. S. Edwards & Son.	Howdon-on-Tyne	United Kingdom	For private owner.
Unknown date	No. 19	Steam lighter	W. S. Cumming	Monkland Canal	United Kingdom	For private owner.
Unknown date	No. 20	Barge	H. S. Edwards & Son.	Howdon-on-Tyne	United Kingdom	For private owner.
Unknown date	No. 20	Steam lighter	W. S. Cumming	Monkland Canal	United Kingdom	For private owner.
Unknown date	No. 21	Barge	H. S. Edwards & Son.	Howdon-on-Tyne	United Kingdom	For private owner.
Unknown date	No. 21	Steam lighter	W. S. Cumming	Monkland Canal	United Kingdom	For private owner.
Unknown date	No. 22	Barge	H. S. Edwards & Son.	Howdon-on-Tyne	United Kingdom	For private owner.
Unknown date	No. 23	Steamship	H. S. Edwards & Son.	Howdon-on-Tyne	United Kingdom	For private owner.
Unknown date	No. 24	Steamship	H. S. Edwards & Son.	Howdon-on-Tyne	United Kingdom	For private owner.
Unknown date	No. 25	Barge	H. S. Edwards & Son.	Howdon-on-Tyne	United Kingdom	For private owner.
Unknown date	No. 26	Barge	H. S. Edwards & Son.	Howdon-on-Tyne	United Kingdom	For private owner.
Unknown date	No. 27	Barge	H. S. Edwards & Son.	Howdon-on-Tyne	United Kingdom	For private owner.
Unknown date	No. 28	Barge	H. S. Edwards & Son.	Howdon-on-Tyne	United Kingdom	For private owner.
Unknown date	No. 29	Barge	H. S. Edwards & Son.	Howdon-on-Tyne	United Kingdom	For private owner.
Unknown date	No. 30	Barge	H. S. Edwards & Son.	Howdon-on-Tyne	United Kingdom	For private owner.
Unknown date	No. 31	Steamship	H. S. Edwards & Son.	Howdon-on-Tyne	United Kingdom	For private owner.
Unknown date	No. 32	Steamship	H. S. Edwards & Son.	Howdon-on-Tyne	United Kingdom	For private owner.
Unknown date	No. 33	Barge	H. S. Edwards & Son.	Howdon-on-Tyne	United Kingdom	For private owner.
Unknown date	No. 33	Steamboat	McArthur & Co.	Abbotsinch	United Kingdom	For private owner.
Unknown date	No. 34	Steamboat	McArthur & Co.	Abbotsinch	United Kingdom	For private owner.
Unknown date	No. 35	Steamboat	McArthur & Co.	Abbotsinch	United Kingdom	For private owner.
Unknown date	No. 38	Steamboat	McArthur & Co.	Abbotsinch	United Kingdom	For private owner.
Unknown date	No. 86	Steamboat	Waite & Son	West Cowes	United Kingdom	For private owner.
Unknown date	No. 93	Steamship	Messrs. Murdoch & Murray	Port Glasgow	United Kingdom	For William Lean.
Unknown date	No. 121	Dredger	Messrs. Fleming & Ferguson	Paisley	United Kingdom	For Auckland Harbour Board.
Unknown date	No. 482	Steamship	Sir W. G. Armstrong, Mitchell & Co.	Low Walker	United Kingdom	For private owner.
Unknown date	Not named	Steamship	Tyne Iron Shipbuilding Company	Willington Quay	United Kingdom	For private owner.
Unknown date	Unnamed	Steamship	William Dickenson	Birkenhead	United Kingdom	For private owner.
Unknown date	Unnamed	Steamship	Messrs. Newall & Co.	Bristol	United Kingdom	For private owner.
