= Ziese (surname) =

Ziese is a surname. Notable people with the surname include:

- Burkhard Ziese (1944–2010), German football manager
- Carl H. Ziese (1848–1917), German mechanical engineer, railway machinery manufacturer and shipbuilder
- Christa Maria Ziese (1924–2012), German Lied, concert and operatic soprano
- Maxim Ziese (1901–1955), German dramatist and writer
