= Carl H. Ziese =

German mechanical engineer (1848–1917)

Carl Heinz Ziese
- Born: July 2, 1848; Moscow
- Died: December 5, 1917 (aged 69)

Carl H. Ziese, (2 July 1848, Moscow - 5 December 1917) was a German mechanical engineer, railway machinery manufacturer and shipbuilder of East Prussian origin.

== Biography ==
Ziese was the son of Alexandr Ziese, the proprietor of a great machinery workshop. After the death of his father he went with his mother to the Hanseatic town of Kiel, improving his workshop experience on mechanical engineering, traveling to England and Scotland and studying Naval Architecture and Mechanical Engineering at the Arts and Industries Academy of Berlin.

He also built with his father-in-law a shipyard in Pillau (present-day Baltijsk) near Königsberg, East Prussia (today Kaliningrad Oblast).

In 1877 they built the first torpedo boat ever ordered for the Russian Navy.

== Personal life ==
In 1873, aged 25, he married a daughter of Ferdinand Schichau (1814–1896), a railway engines manufacturer and shipbuilder who has studied and visited prominent engineers in Berlin, and in England who had started his own company in Elbing, a former hanseatic town, (modern Elbląg, Poland) in 1837.

His only daughter, née Hildegard Ziese, married Swedish Engineer Carl Carlson, taking over as Hildegard Carlson, the general running of the several thousand industrial workers from their shipyards and factories in what is now either Poland or the Russian Federation.
