= SV Ursula =

German barque (1885–1889)

History

German Empire
- Name: Ursula
- Owner: D. H. Wätjen und Co., Bremen
- Builder: company of Hermann Friedrich Ulrichs
- Yard number: 111
- Launched: 1885
- Out of service: 30 October 1889
- Fate: driven ashore and wrecked on Terschelling, the Netherlands

General characteristics
- Tonnage: 1497 BRT
- Length: 65.5 m (214 ft 11 in)
- Beam: 11.3 m (37 ft 1 in)
- Sail plan: three masts

SV Ursula was a 63-metre (207 ft)-long German barque. She was built by the company of Hermann Friedrich Ulrichs in 1885 and owned by D. H. Wätjen und Co. with hometown Bremen.

On 30 October 1889 the ship was driven ashore and wrecked on Terschelling, the Netherlands. The crew members were rescued. The salvage operation took several years until the ship had completely sank in the sand. The cargo was sold in public auctions in Terschelling and Amsterdam. The captain was blamed Maritime Board of Inquiry in Bremerhaven for the accident. The wreck was rediscovered in 2004, and many dives had been made to the wreck since that time.

== Ship details ==
The barque was made of steel was 65.5 m (215 ft) long and had a width of 11.3 m (37 ft). She weighed 1497 BRT. The ship had three iron masts.

== History and fate ==
The ship was built for D. H. Wätjen und Co. by company of Hermann Friedrich Ulrichs and was launched in 1885. She had homeport Bremen, Germany.

In October 1889 she was on voyage from Bassein, Burma to Bremen with a cargo of teak, bamboo and rice under command of A. Morisse. Due to fog she stranded near Terschelling, the Netherlands.

The tugboat Hercules tried for four hours to pull her loose but failed. The ship suffered a leak due to bad weather with water coming into the ship. The crew was taken off and brought with the Vlie No.4 to Terschelling. On 5 November the tugs Assecuradeur and Pilot went to the ship but could not do anything to refloat her. Boats with pumps started pumping out the water from the ship. However, the ship sank into the sand and by 6 November the ship was broken. On 18 November the prow of the ship was above the water. In December the ship was totally under water. In January 1890 the ship had lost two of its iron masts.

== Salvage ==
Ships started with salvaging sails and inventory of the ship. The high breaking waves made it almost impossible for sailing ships to reach the ship. More and more water entered the ship and was 4.9 m (16 ft) by 3 November.

After several days an agreement was signed between the ship's captain Morisse and the owner of the steamboat shipping company of Nieuwediep and IJmuiden for salvaging the cargo and the ship for the value of 20%. Meanwhile the ship was sinking into the sand.

Salvage of the rice continued through 1889 and 1890 with updates in newspapers how much rice was salvaged on a daily basis. In November 1890 the ship had totally sunk into the sand after a storm. An investigation was started regarding the condition of the ship. The salvage was postponed to the spring of 1891. Results of an investigation concluded in July 1891 that the ship was lying at the same level with the sand and that the chance was small the remains of the valuable cargo could be salvaged.

The third mast had become a beacon for maritime navigation. In September 1891 this third mast was salvaged.

=== Sales ===
On 10 November a first public auction was held on Terschelling selling 21,000 bales of rice, 108 pieces of teak and 3430 bundles of rattan. It had a revenue of f 560. Meanwhile salvage of more rice and rot continued.

On 19 November another auction was held selling inventory, with a revenue of f 1045.

Rice that was salvaged later was sent to Amsterdam where it was auctioned, among others on 27 November.

== Court case ==
On 4 December 1889 the office of the Maritime Board of Inquiry in Bremerhaven (in German: Seeamt in Bremerhaven) ruled on who was responsible for the ship's stranding and sinking. At the time the captain thought ship was sailing north of the lighthouse of Terschelling, he started sailing in eastern direction. Because the ship was still sailing west of Terschelling the ship stranded. The captain of the ship was blamed that he relied too much on the equipment for location determination; that he had not used the perpendicular and that he had not asked the mates for advice.

== Wreck dives ==
In 2004 the wreck was discovered by a diver and was still almost completely covered in sand. A piece of the broken foremast was sticking out of the sand. Every year the wreck has emerged further from the sand and the bottom is now completely free. Over the years a diving team has recovered a large number of teak beams, marked MOHR and a large number of other wooden blocks and pieces. There are still remains of the cargo of rattan.
