= USS Stiletto =

Torpedo boat of the United States Navy

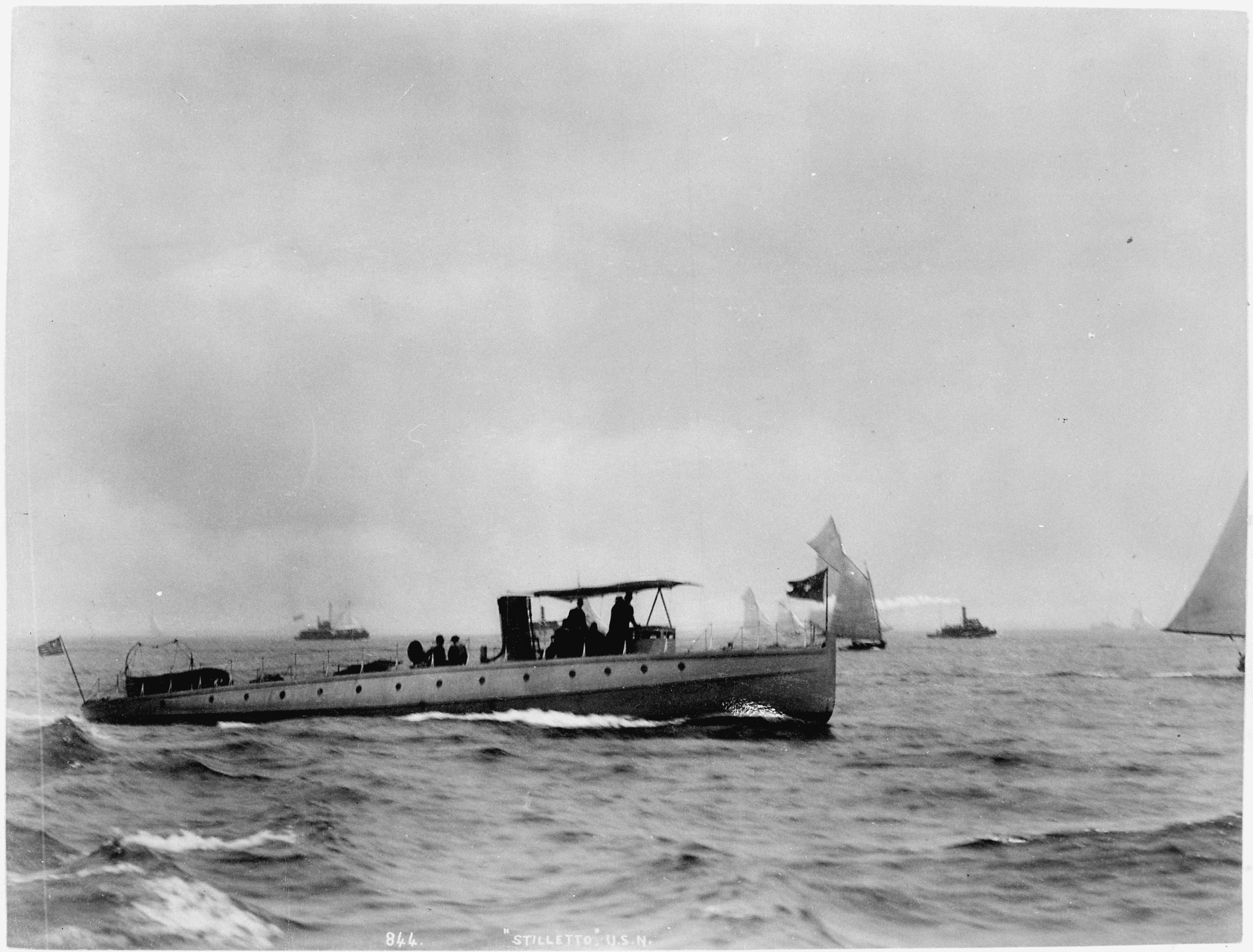
- Stiletto in 1891

History

United States
- Builder: Herreshoff Manufacturing Co.
- Laid down: 1885
- Acquired: 3 March 1887
- In service: July 1887
- Stricken: 27 January 1911
- Fate: Sold for scrap 18 July 1911

General characteristics
- Displacement: 31 tons
- Length: 94 ft (29 m)
- Beam: 11 ft 6 in (3.51 m)
- Draft: 5 ft (1.5 m)
- Speed: 23.3 knots
- Complement: 6

USS Stiletto, a wooden torpedo boat, was launched in 1885 at the Herreshoff Manufacturing Co., Bristol, Rhode Island, as a private speculation. She was purchased for the United States Navy under an Act of Congress dated 3 March 1887, and entered service in July 1887, attached to the Naval Torpedo Station in Newport Rhode Island.

== History ==
On 10 June 1885, she raced the paddle steamer Mary Powell, easily overtaking her. The next day, she beat the sailing racing yacht Atalanta.

Stiletto was the Navy's first torpedo boat capable of launching self-propelled torpedoes. Purchased for experimental evaluation, Stiletto was based throughout her career at Newport and often captained by Andrew Wright. During 1897, she was modified to burn fuel oil, but results of sea trials held subsequently were disappointing, and the experiment was not repeated. On 14 July 1897 she fouled steam yacht Nautilus (United States) at Bristol, Connecticut, doing minor damage to the yacht. Stiletto was struck from the Navy list on 27 January 1911 and sold on 18 July 1911 at Newport to James F. Nolan of East Boston, Massachusetts for scrapping.

Various states of Stiletto

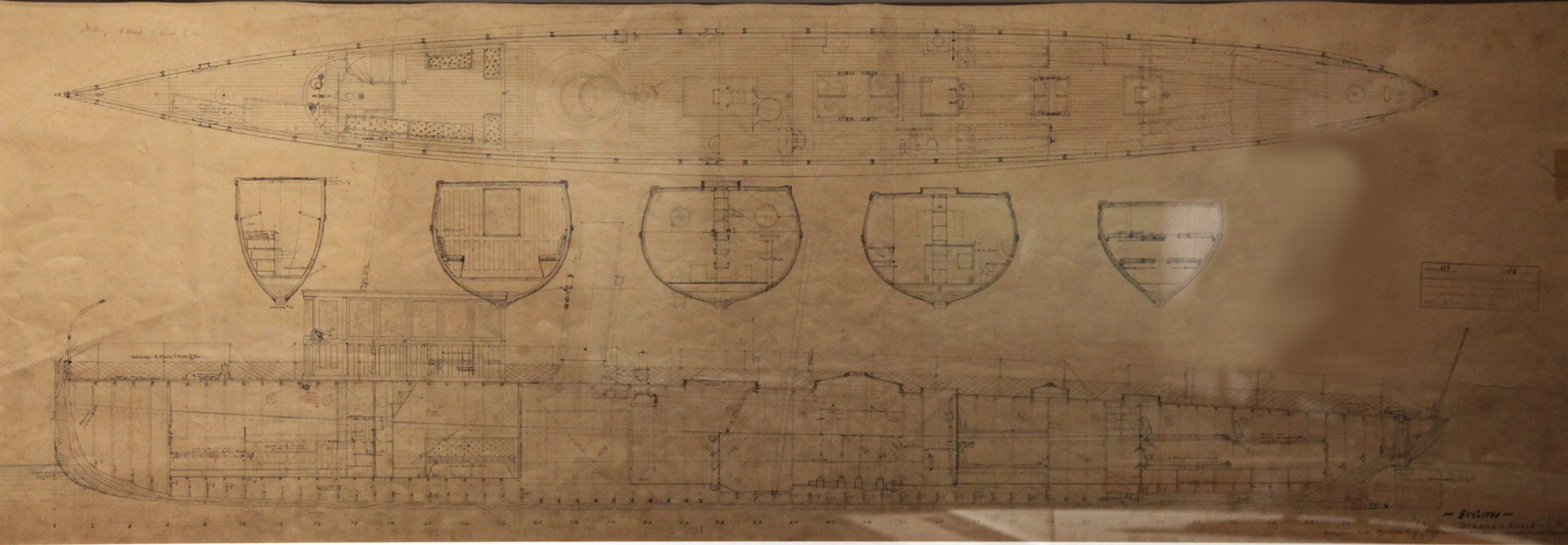
Construction plan

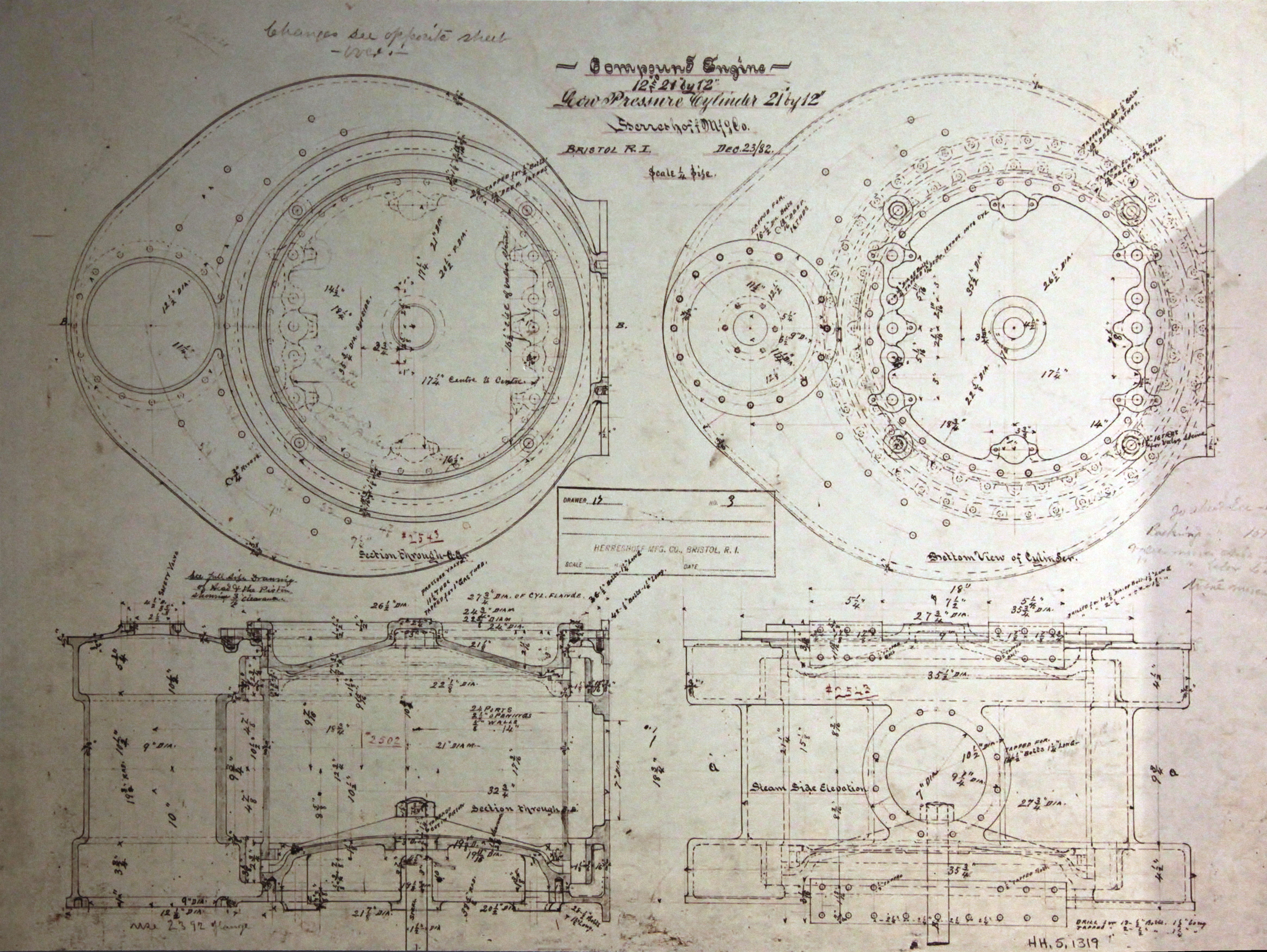
Engine plan

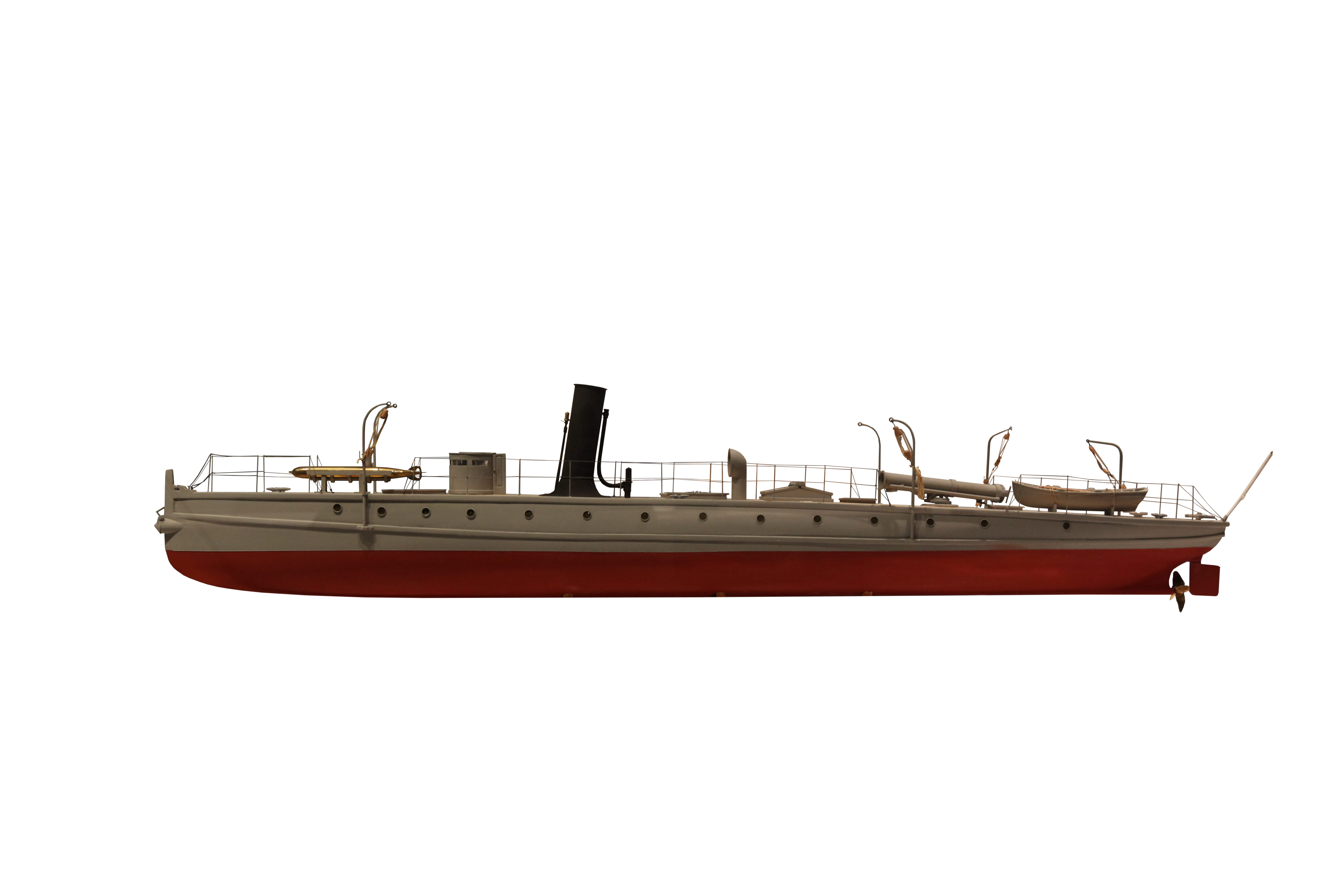
model of "Stiletto" (1885) at MIT, made by Pat Bianco in 1996, on loan from the Naval War College Museum

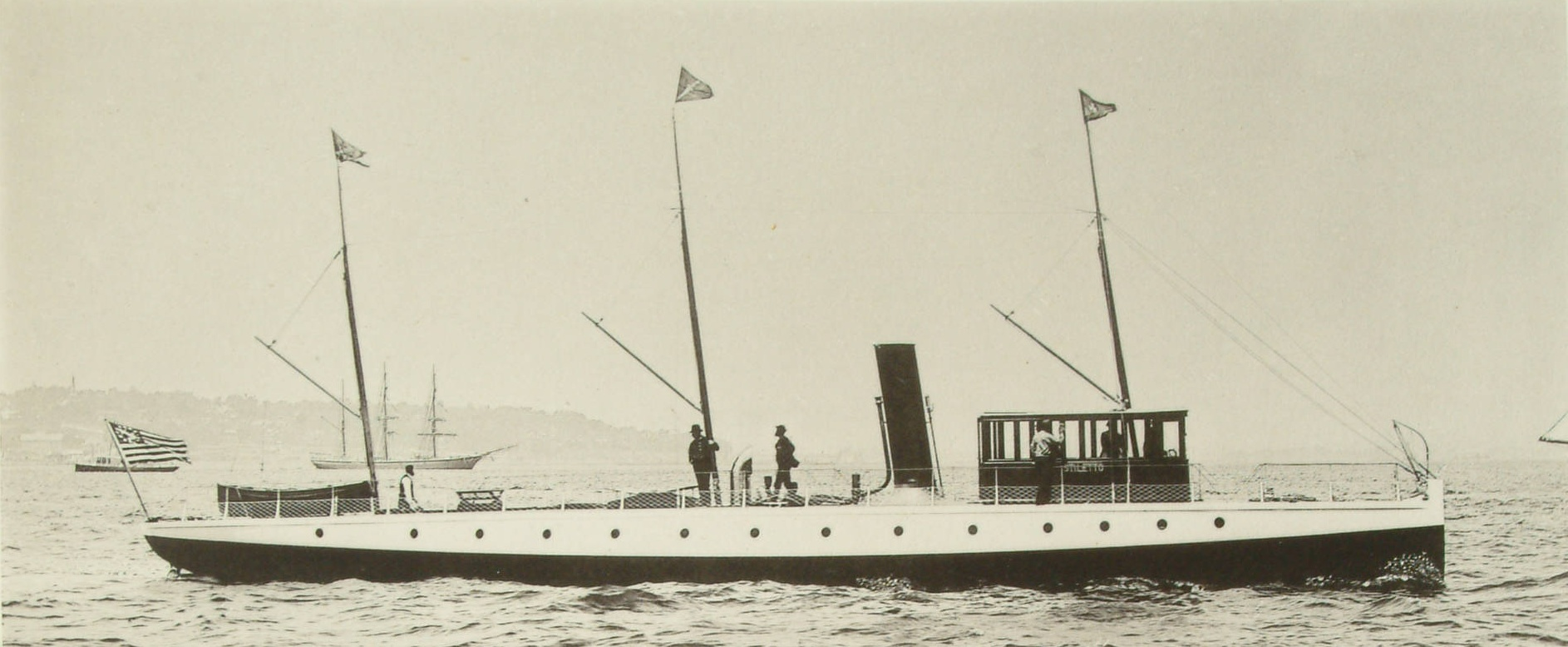
Stiletto in 1887
