= Ferdinand Schichau =

German mechanical engineer and businessman (1814–1896)

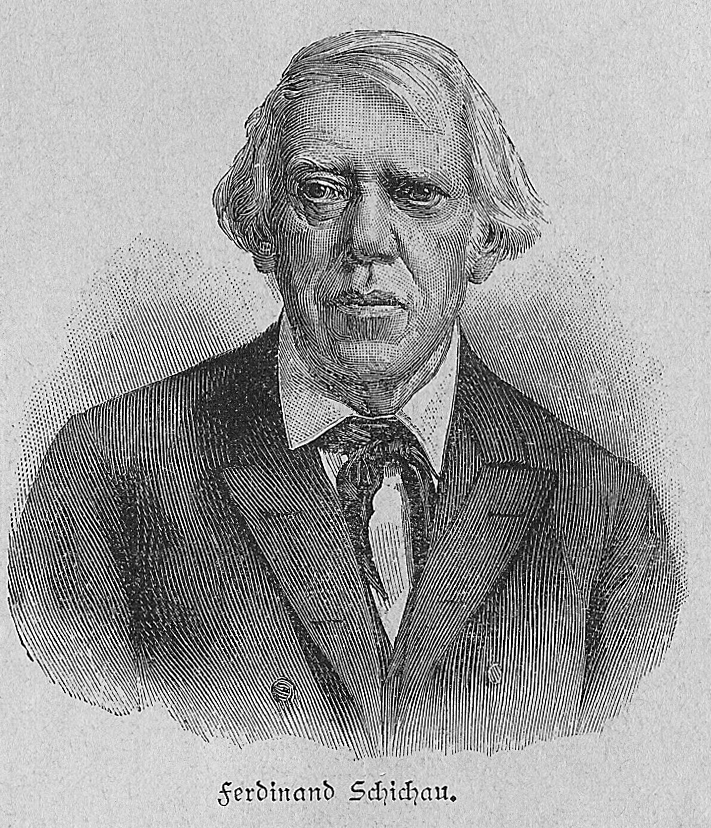
- Born: 30 January 1814; Elbing, Kingdom of Prussia
- Died: 23 January 1896 (aged 81); Elbing, German Empire
- Occupations: Engineer, industrialist

Ferdinand Gottlob Schichau (30 January 1814 – 23 January 1896) was a German mechanical engineer and businessman.

Schichau was born in Elbing, West Prussia (modern Elbląg, Poland) to a smith and iron worker. He studied engineering in Berlin and visited the Rhineland and England. In 1837 he started his own company in Elbing. He also built a shipyard in Pillau near Königsberg (East Prussia) (today Baltiysk, Kaliningrad Oblast).

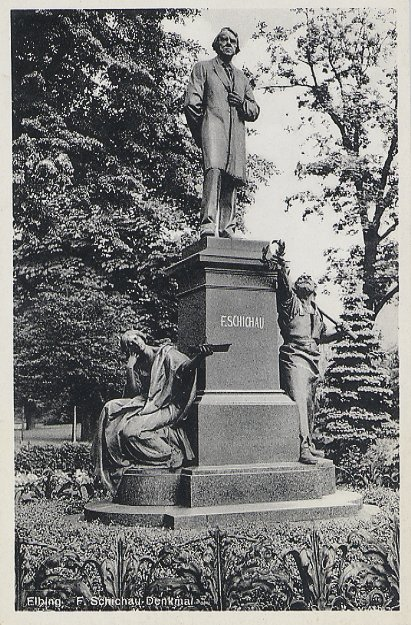
The Schichau Memorial in the park along Schichaustraße, Elbing. The city now belongs to Poland; the statue no longer exists, and the street has been renamed.

The Schichau-Werke became a large industrial complex, which employed several thousand people. Schichau made hydraulic presses, industrial machines and steam engines. For his workers he erected a large living quarter section in Elbing. The Borussia, constructed by him, was the first screw-vessel in Germany.

Schichau gained an associate when his daughter married around 1873 Carl H. Ziese (1848 -1917) the constructor in 1874 of the first compound steam engine to be integrated in a German gunship.

The company had so many orders that it became necessary to construct another large shipyard in nearby Danzig (Gdańsk) as well. In 1896 Schichau employed about 4,000 labourers his private assets were appraised at 30 million German gold mark. Schichau died in Elbing on 23 January 1896, his son in law (Ziese) continued to lead the company till his own death in 1917. Ziese's only daughter, Hildegard, married Swedish Engineer Carl Carlson.

After her husband's death, Hildegard Carlson ran the former firm of her father Carl and grand father Ferdinand building, mainly, railway engines till the thereafters of a company active till no less than 1945.

When Elbing and Danzig were transferred to Poland after World War II, Schichau's memory all but disappeared. The street in Elbing named after him (Schichaustraße) was renamed ul. Stoczniowa, and his statue was destroyed. His contributions only recently became known in Poland at the end of the Cold War.

Schichau's name remains in the Schichau Seebeck Shipyard at Bremerhaven.
