= Tōgō Heihachirō =

Japanese Marshal Admiral

Junior First Rank Marshal-Admiral Marquess Tōgō Heihachirō
- 東郷 平八郎
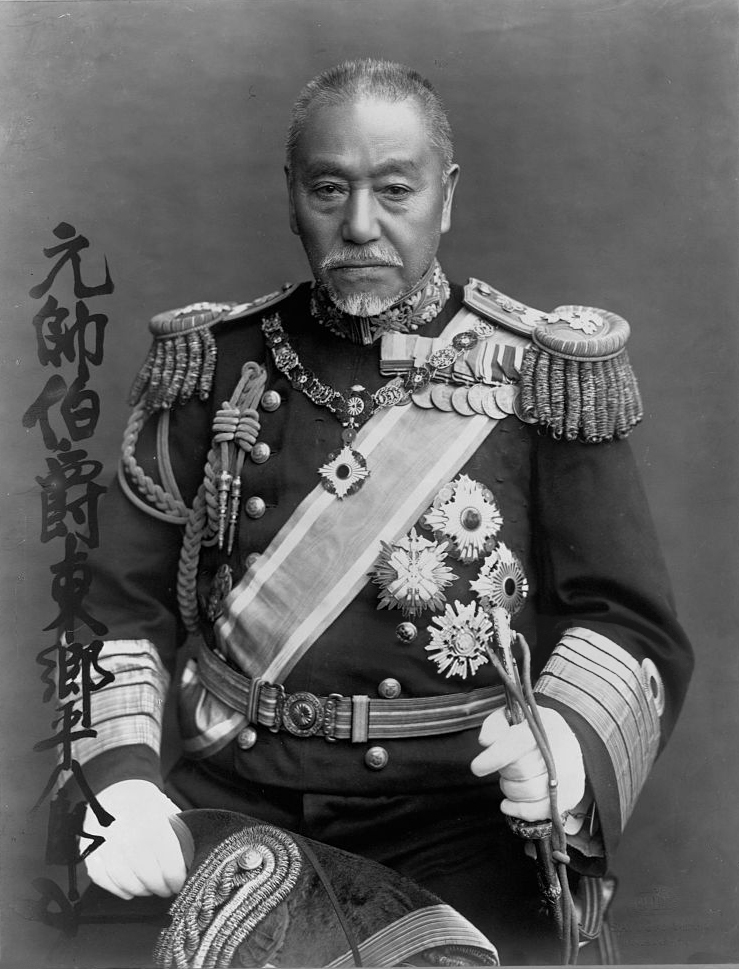
- Born: 27 January 1848; Kagoshima, Satsuma Domain
- Died: 30 May 1934 (aged 86); Tokyo, Empire of Japan
- Military career
- Allegiance: Empire of Japan
- Branch: Imperial Japanese Navy
- Service years: 1863–1913
- Rank: Marshal Admiral
- Nickname: "The Nelson of the East"
- Commands: Commander-in-Chief of the Combined Fleet
- Conflicts: Anglo-Satsuma War; Boshin War; Battle of Awa; Battle of Hakodate; Battle of Miyako Bay; Sino-French War (observing); First Sino-Japanese War; Battle of Pungdo; Battle of the Yalu River; Battle of Weihaiwei; Boxer Rebellion; Russo-Japanese War; Battle of Port Arthur; Battle of the Yellow Sea; Battle of Tsushima
- Awards: Collar of the Supreme Order of the Chrysanthemum; Order of the Golden Kite (First Class); Grand Cordon of the Order of the Rising Sun; Grand Cordon of the Order of the Sacred Treasure; Order of Merit; Honorary Knight Grand Cross of the Royal Victorian Order; Grand Cordon in the Order of Leopold (Belgium)
- Other work: Tutor to Crown Prince Hirohito

Tōgō Heihachirō (東郷 平八郎; 27 January 1848 – 30 May 1934) was a Japanese naval officer who served as a gensui or admiral of the fleet in the Imperial Japanese Navy and became one of Japan's greatest naval heroes. As Commander-in-Chief of the Combined Fleet during the Russo-Japanese War of 1904–1905, he successfully confined the Russian Pacific naval forces to Port Arthur before winning a decisive victory over a relieving fleet at Tsushima in May 1905. Western journalists called Tōgō "the Nelson of the East". He remains deeply revered as a national hero in Japan, with shrines and streets named in his honour.

== Early life ==
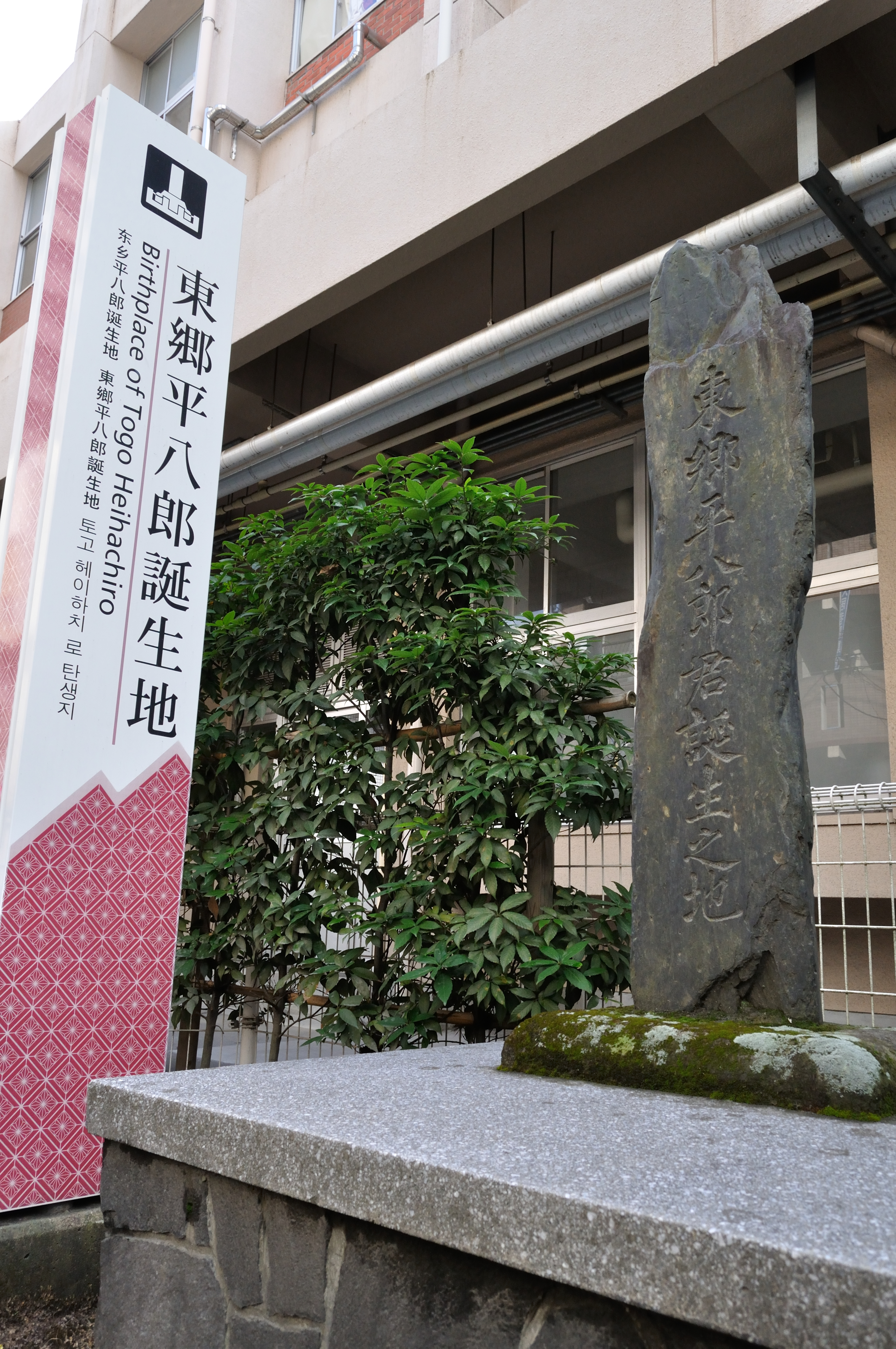
Monument recording site of birthplace in Kagoshima

Tōgō was born as Tōgō Nakagorō (仲五郎) on 27 January 1848 in the Kajiya-chō (加治屋町) district of the city of Kagoshima in Satsuma domain (modern-day Kagoshima Prefecture), the third of four sons of Togo Kichizaemon, a samurai serving the Shimazu daimyō as controller of the revenue, master of the wardrobe, and district governor, and Hori Masuko (1812–1901), a noblewoman from the same clan as her husband.

Kajiya-chō was one of Kagoshima's samurai housing-districts, in which many other influential figures of the Meiji period were born, such as Saigō Takamori and Ōkubo Toshimichi. They rose to prominent positions under the Meiji Emperor partly because the Shimazu clan had been a decisive military and political factor in the Boshin War against the Tokugawa shogunate during the Meiji Restoration.

As a youth, Tōgō was educated to become a samurai warrior. He changed his name to Heihachirō (meaning "peaceful son") in a religious and patriotic ceremony held when he turned 13, in which samurai tradition called for youth to adopt a change in name (genpuku).

== Tokugawa conflicts (1863–1869) ==
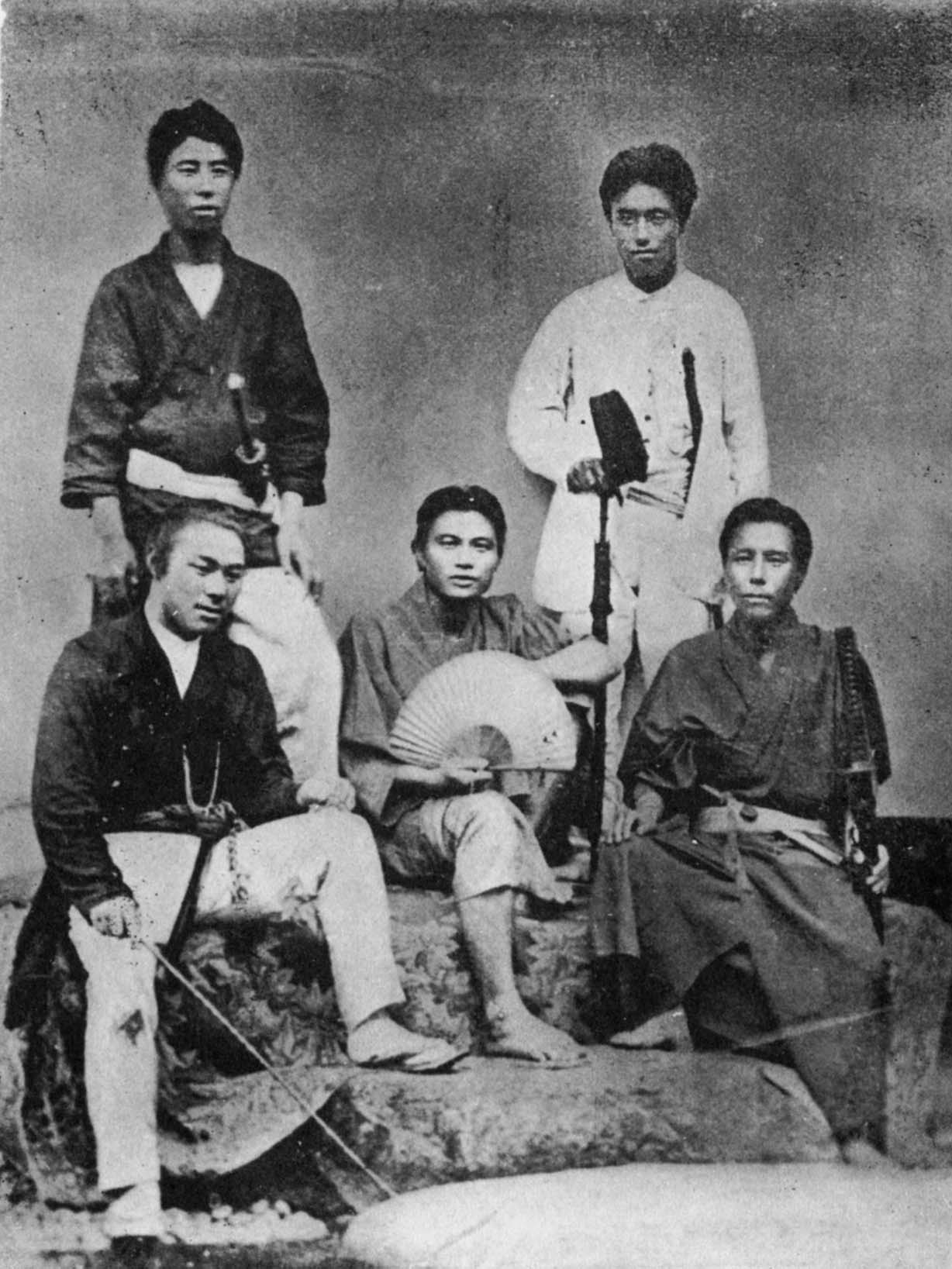
Officers of the Japanese warship Kasuga in August 1869. Third-class officer Tōgō is dressed in white, top right.

Tōgō's first experience at war was during the Bombardment of Kagoshima in August 1863, in which Kagoshima was shelled by the Royal Navy to punish the Satsuma daimyō for the death of Charles Lennox Richardson on the Tōkaidō highway the previous year (the Namamugi Incident), and the Japanese refusal to pay an indemnity in compensation. Tōgō, who was aged 15 at the time, was part of a gun crew manning one of the cannons defending the port.

The following year, Satsuma established a navy, in which Tōgō enlisted in 1866 at age 17. Two of his brothers also enlisted. In January 1868, during the Boshin War, Tōgō was assigned to the paddle-wheel steam warship Kasuga, which participated in the Battle of Awa, near Osaka, against the navy of the Tokugawa Bakufu, the first Japanese naval battle between two modern fleets.

As the conflict spread to northern Japan, Tōgō participated as a third-class officer aboard the Kasuga in the last battles against the remnants of the Bakufu forces, the Battle of Miyako Bay and the Battle of Hakodate in 1869.

After the civil war ended in the autumn 1869, Tōgō, on the instructions of the Satsuma clan, first travelled to the treaty port of Yokohama to study English. He resided in Yokohama with Daisuke Shibata, a government official reputedly proficient in English and received additional pronunciation coaching from Charles Wagman, Japan correspondent of The Illustrated London News. Tōgō made rapid progress in his studies and in 1870 secured a place at the newly established Imperial Japanese Navy Training School at Tsukiji, Tokyo. On 11 December 1870 he was formally appointed a cadet on the Japanese ironclad flagship Ryūjō, then at anchor in Yokohama harbour.

== Studies in Britain (1871–1878) ==
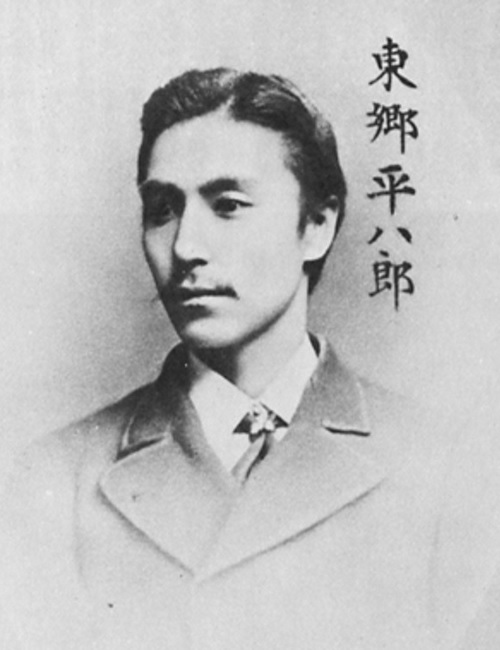
Tōgō during his studies in Europe, in 1877

In February 1871, Tōgō and eleven other Japanese officer cadets were selected to travel to Britain to further their naval studies. Between extensive practical sea training and an extended voyage to Australia, Tōgō lived and studied in Britain for a period of seven years. Arriving at the port of Southampton in April 1871 after a journey of 80 days, Tōgō first traveled to London, at that time the most populous city in the world. According to contemporary accounts of the cadet's first days in England, many things were strange to Japanese eyes at that time; the domed buildings made out of stone, the "number and massiveness of the buildings", "the furnishings of a commonplace European room", and "the displays in the butchers' shop windows: it took them several days to become accustomed to such an abundance of meat."

The Japanese group was separated and sent to English boarding houses for individual instruction in English language, customs and manners. Tōgō was initially sent for some weeks to a boarding house in the major naval port of Plymouth, to gain some understanding of the British Royal Navy. Subsequently, he studied history, mathematics and engineering at a naval preparatory school in Portsmouth under the direction of a tutor and local clergyman in order to prepare for admission to the training establishment Britannia at Dartmouth, Devon.

After the British Admiralty decided in 1872 that no places were to be made available at Dartmouth for the Japanese cadets, Tōgō was able to gain admission as a cadet on HMS Worcester, the training ship of the Thames Nautical Training College, moored at Greenhithe. Tōgō found his cadet rations "inadequate": "I swallowed my small rations in a moment. I formed the habit of dipping my bread in my tea and eating a great deal of it, to the surprise of my English comrades." Tōgō's comrades called him "Johnny Chinaman", being unfamiliar with the "Orient" and not knowing the difference between Asiatic peoples. "The young samurai did not like that, and on more than one occasion he would threaten to put an end to it by blows." Gunnery training for the college was held aboard HMS Victory, at the time moored in Portsmouth harbour. Tōgō is recorded to have attended Trafalgar Day observances on the deck of the ship in 1873. After two years of training, Tōgō was to graduate second in his class.

During 1875, Tōgō circumnavigated the world as an ordinary seaman on the British training ship Hampshire, leaving in February and staying seventy days at sea without a port call until reaching Melbourne. Tōgō "observed the strange animals on the Southern continent". Rounding Cape Horn on his return voyage, Tōgō had sailed thirty thousand miles before returning to England in September 1875. During the autumn and winter of 1875–1876, Tōgō spent five months in Cambridge studying mathematics and English under the direction of the Rev. Arthur Douglas Capel. The Rev. Capel was at the time of Tōgō's visit, both a mathematics tutor and curate at the Anglican church of Little St Mary's, Cambridge. Tōgō is recorded to have attended services at the church during his stay.

In 1875 Tōgō suffered a bout of illness which severely threatened his eyesight: "the patient asked his medical advisers to 'try everything', and some of their experiments were extremely painful." Capel commented later, "If I had not seen with my own eyes what a Japanese can suffer without complaint, I should often have been disinclined to believe ... But, having observed Tōgō, I believe all of them." Harley Street ophthalmologists were able to save his eyesight. Upon recovery Tōgō travelled to Portsmouth to continue his training before being assigned the role of inspector for the construction of Fusō, one of three new warships ordered by the Imperial Japanese Navy. Residing in proximity to the Royal Naval College, Greenwich, Tōgō made use of the opportunity to apply his training, observing the construction of the ship at the Samuda Brothers shipyard on the Isle of Dogs.

Tōgō was absent from Japan during the Satsuma Rebellion of 1877. His three brothers all fought in the rebellion: two were killed in battle, and the third died shortly after the rebellion's end. Later, Tōgō would often express regret for the fate of his benefactor, Saigō Takamori, who was also killed in that rebellion.

== Return to Japan ==
Tōgō, newly promoted to lieutenant, finally returned to Japan on 22 May 1878 aboard one of the newly purchased British-built ships, Hiei. That same year, he was promoted to the rank of first lieutenant of the Japanese built paddle-steamer warship Jingei, later to be transferred to the corvette Amagi. In 1882, Tōgō led his ship's company in landing troops at Seoul in the wake of the Imo Incident.

In 1883, Tōgō was given command of his first ship, and interacted with the British, American, and German fleets during this time.

== Sino-French War (1884–1885) ==
On his return to Japan Tōgō received several commands, first as captain of Daini Teibō, and then Amagi. During the Sino-French War (1884–1885), Tōgō, onboard Amagi, closely followed the actions of the French fleet under Admiral Courbet.

Tōgō also observed the ground combat of the French forces against the Chinese in Formosa (Taiwan), under the guidance of Joseph Joffre, future Commander-in-Chief of French forces during World War I.

Although first promoted to the rank of captain in 1886, Tōgō suffered from a bout of acute rheumatism during the late 1880s that confined him to bed rest for nearly three years. He used this period of enforced absence from front line naval duties to study aspects of international and maritime law.

== Sino-Japanese War (1894–1895) ==
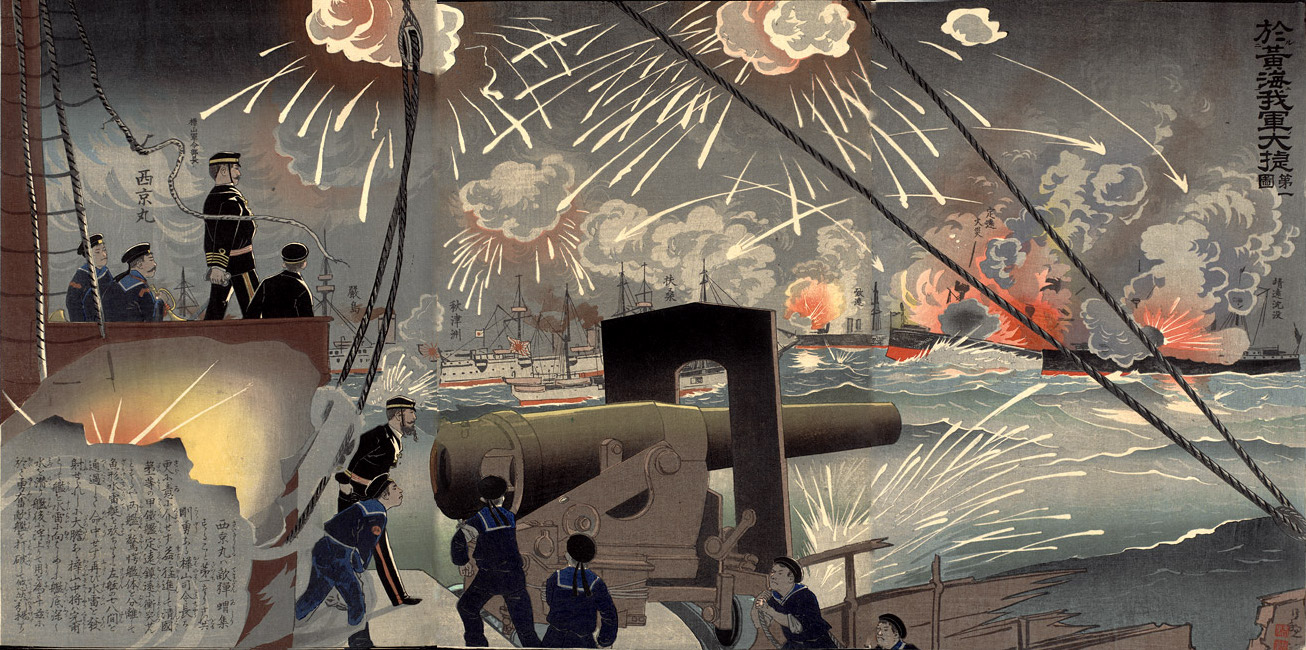
Battle of the Yalu River by Korechika

In 1891, Tōgō's health had sufficiently recovered that he was appointed to the command of the cruiser Naniwa. In 1894, at the beginning of the First Sino-Japanese War, Tōgō, as a captain of Naniwa, sank the transport ship, Kowshing, which was chartered by the Chinese Beiyang Fleet to convey troops, during the Battle of Pungdo. A report of the incident was sent by Suematsu Kenchō to Mutsu Munemitsu. The ship, which was under the command of captain T.R. Galsworthy, who incidentally had been one of Tōgō's instructors as a young cadet on HMS Worcester, had been ferrying more than a thousand Chinese soldiers towards Korea, and these soldiers had refused to be taken prisoner or interned on the appearance and under threat from the Japanese warships.

A contemporary account from a German survivor, Major von Hannecken, stated that the Chinese survivors had been fired upon, sinking two lifeboats. "...By this time only the Kowshing's masts were visible. The water was however covered with Chinese, and there were two lifeboats from the Kowshing crowded with soldiers. The Japanese officer informed me that he had been ordered by signal from the Naniwa to sink these boats. I remonstrated, but he fired two volleys from the cutter, turned back, and steamed for the Naniwa. No attempt was made to rescue the Chinese. The Naniwa steamed about until eight o'clock in the evening, but did not pick up any other Europeans ..."

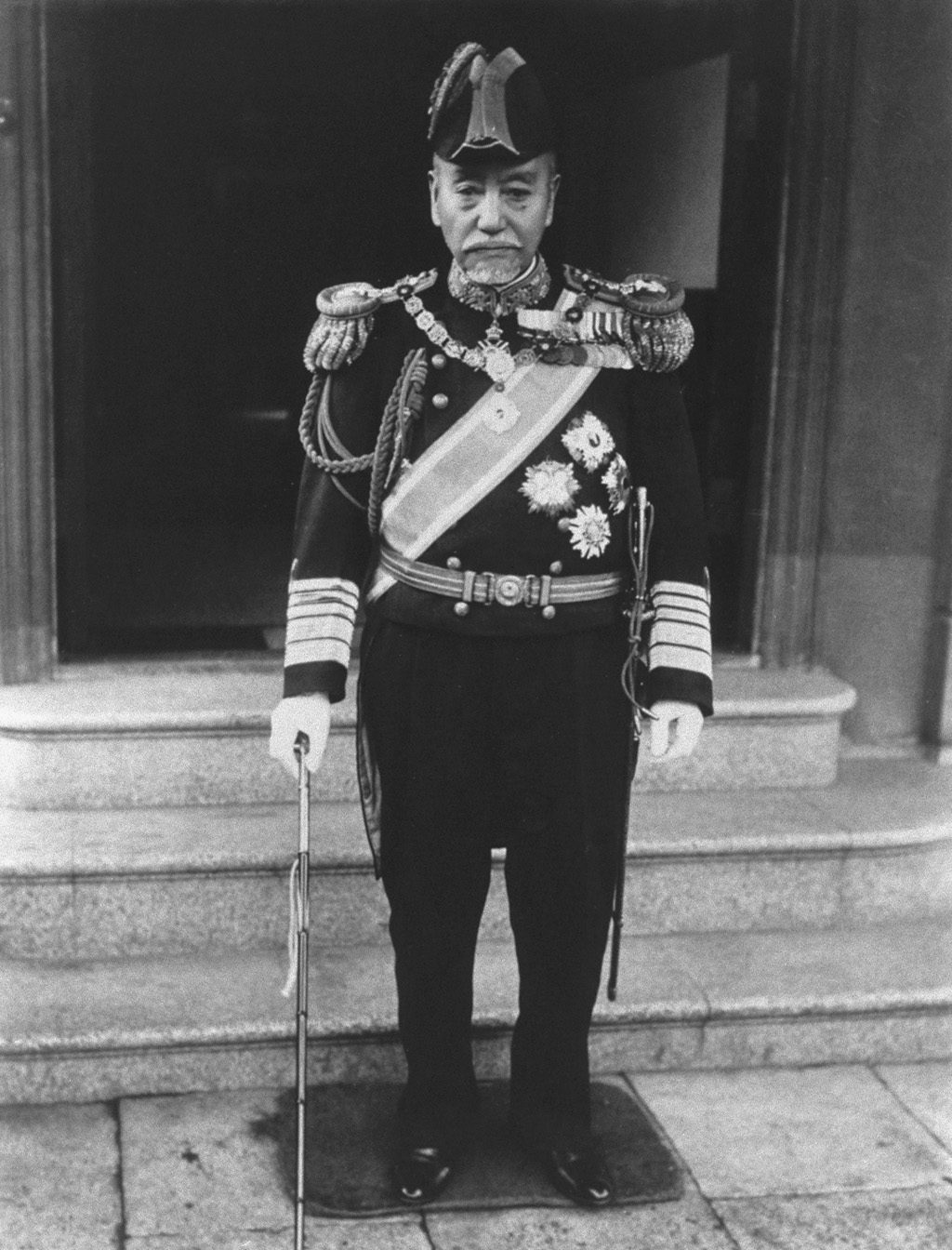
Tōgō in full uniform

Tōgō later took part in the Battle of the Yalu River on 17 September 1894, with Naniwa as the last ship in the line of battle under the overall command of Admiral Tsuboi Kōzō. Naniwa assisted in sinking the Chinese cruisers Jingyuan and Zhiyuan.

Tōgō was promoted to rear admiral at the end of the war, in 1895.

== Subsequent commands ==
In May 1896, Tōgō was appointed commandant of the Naval War College in Tokyo. He reformed the curriculum, and was promoted to vice admiral during this time. In 1899, he was appointed commander of the Sasebo Naval College, and he also served as Commander of the Standing Fleet.

With the advent of the Boxer Rebellion in China in 1899, Tōgō was appointed Admiral of the Fleet and recalled to active sea duty on 20 May 1900. During the rebellion, he was responsible for patrolling the Chinese coast. As the Boxer Rebellion was crushed in 1902, Tōgō was relieved of his command, and was decorated for his service to the Emperor. He was subsequently posted to supervise the construction of and become the first commander of the naval base at Maizuru.

== Russo-Japanese War (1904–1905) ==
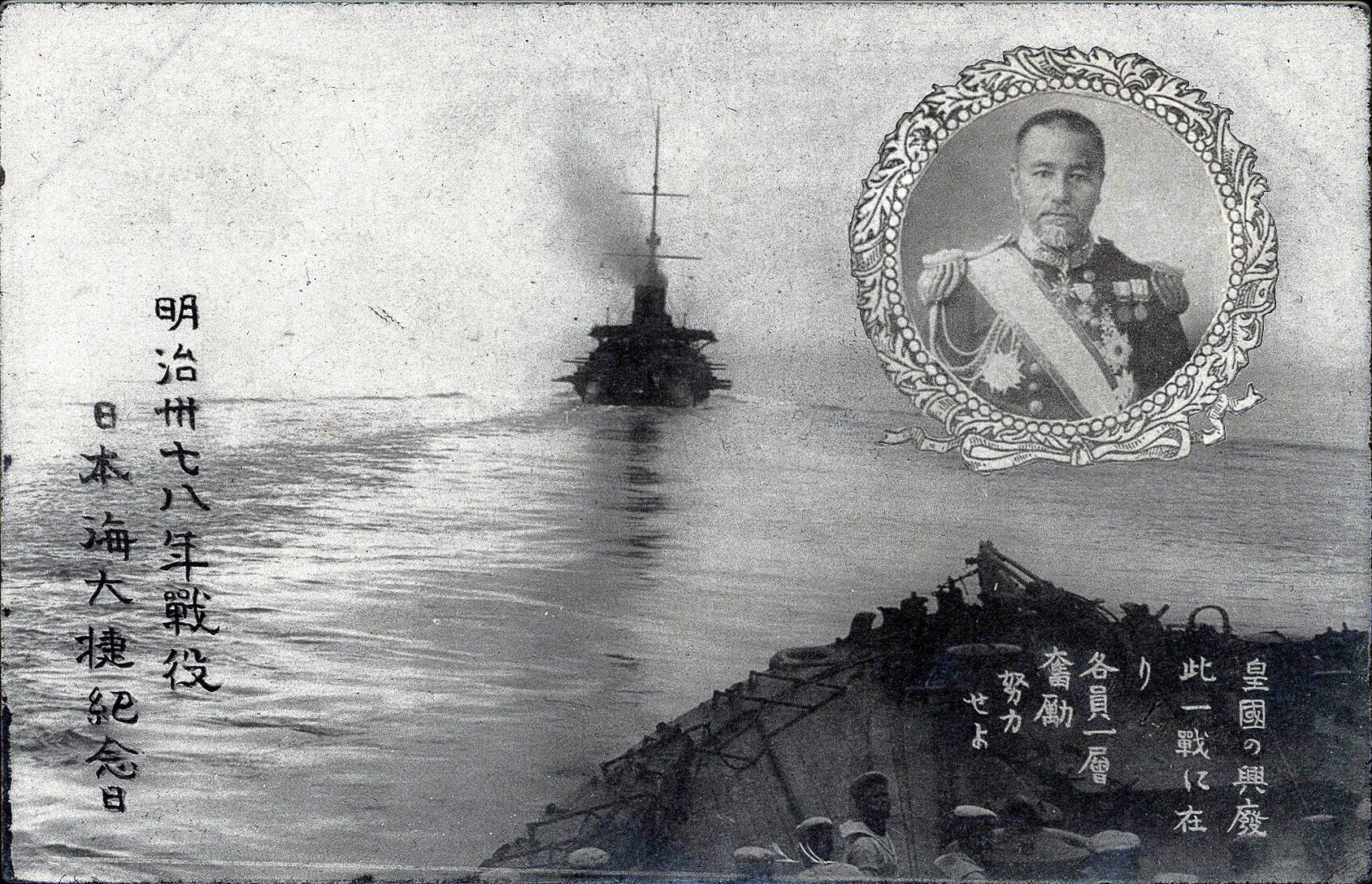
Inset photo of Tōgō, c. 1905, over a photograph of his flagship, Mikasa, leading the Japanese Navy battle line into action against the Russian Navy.

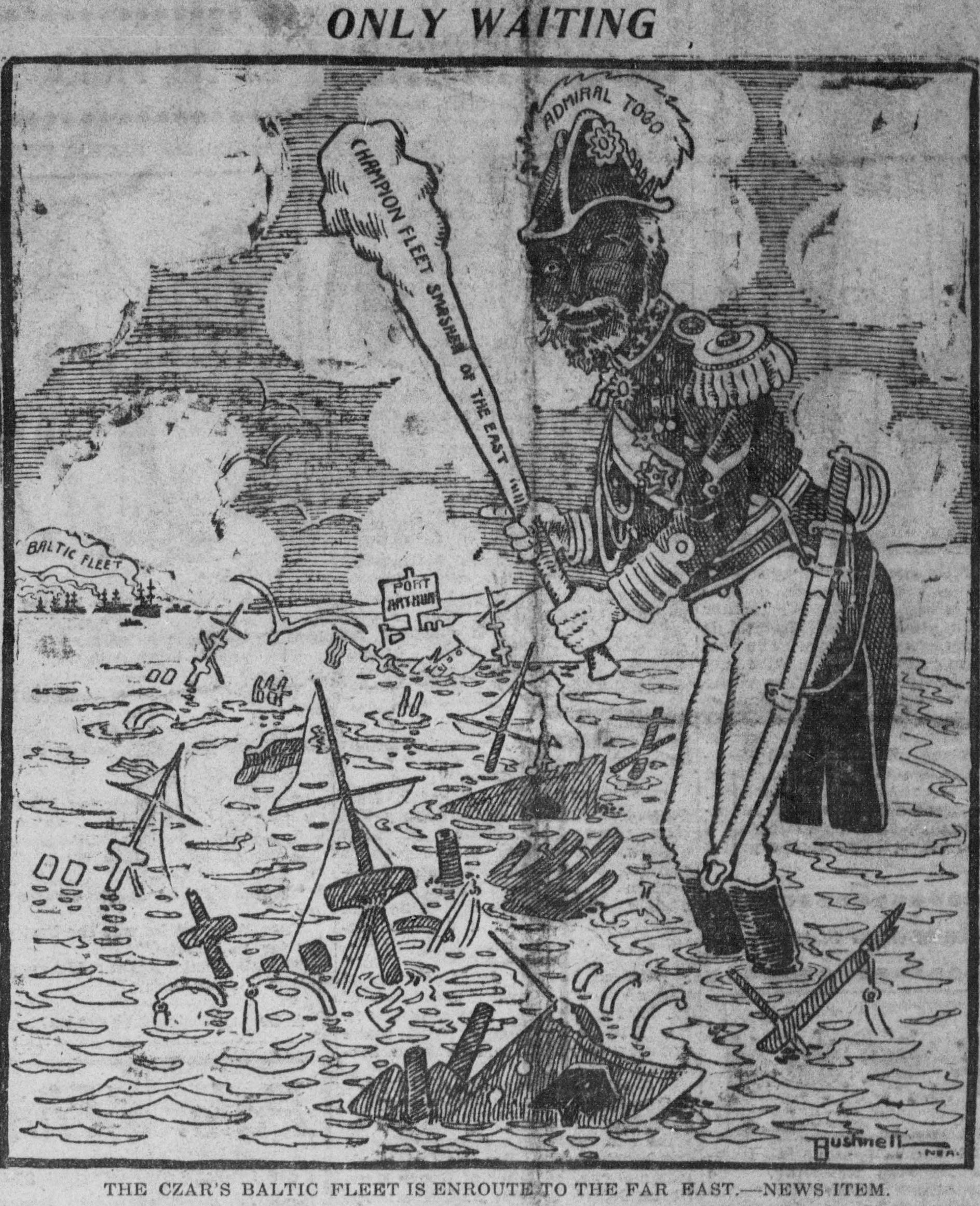
Tōgō (personifying the Imperial Japanese Navy) stands at Port Arthur among the wreckage of the Pacific Fleet, wielding his club; off in the distance, the Baltic Fleet approaches.

In 1903, the Navy Minister Yamamoto Gonnohyōe appointed Tōgō Commander-in-Chief of the Combined Fleet of the Imperial Japanese Navy. This astonished many people, including Emperor Meiji, who asked Yamamoto why Tōgō was appointed. Yamamoto replied to the emperor, "Because Tōgō is a man of good fortune".

During the Russo-Japanese War, Tōgō engaged the Russian navy at Port Arthur and the Yellow Sea in 1904, and to widespread international acclaim commanded the Japanese naval forces at the destruction of the Imperial Russian Navy's Baltic Fleet at the Battle of Tsushima in May 1905.

As the Japanese fleet closed with the Russians on 27 May 1905, Tōgō ordered the Z flag hoisted alone from Mikasa's masthead. By prearrangement among his officers, the signal, flown without any accompanying flags, conveyed the message "The fate of the Empire rests on the outcome of this battle. Let each man do his utmost." Contemporary and later accounts have compared it to Nelson's signal before Trafalgar. Tōgō then executed a sweeping turn that placed his ships across the head of the Russian line, a maneuver later remembered in Japan as the Tōgō Turn and known more generally as crossing the T. It allowed the full broadside armament of each Japanese ship to bear on the lead Russian vessels while the Russian fleet, still in column, could reply with only its forward guns; the Japanese fleet went on to destroy or capture the great majority of the 35 Russian warships engaged, and the maneuver was subsequently studied and adopted by other navies, including those of Britain and France.

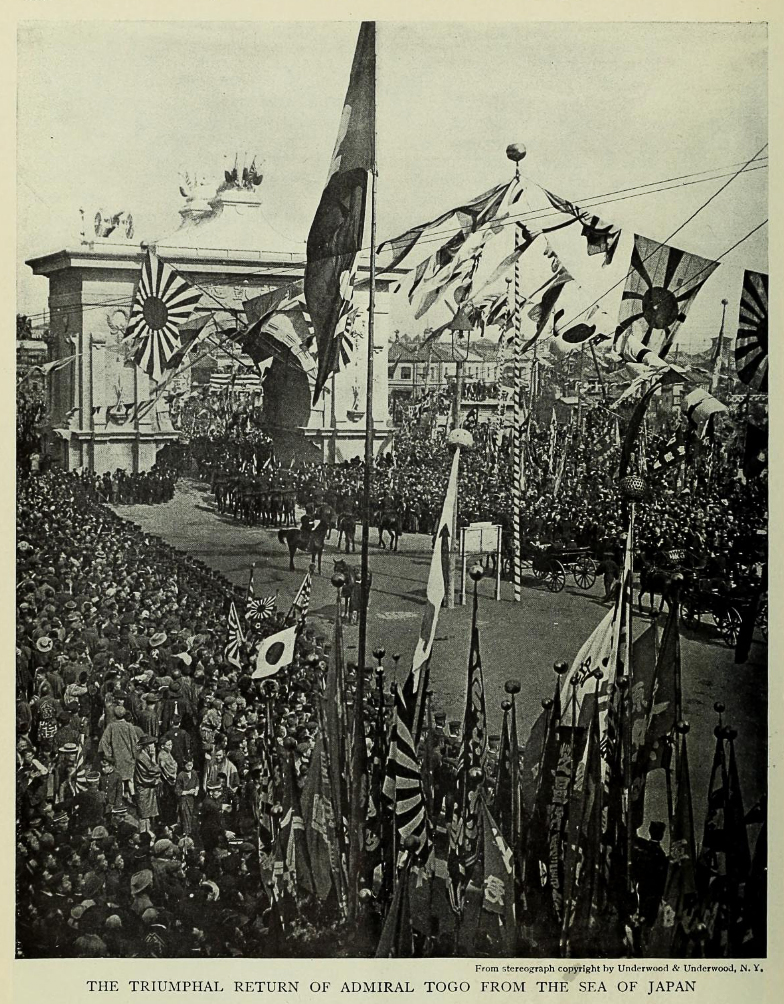
The triumphal return of Tōgō from the Sea of Japan. Tokyo, 1907

The Battle of Tsushima was considered a daring naval victory pitting a small but rapidly militarising emerging Asian nation against a major European adversary. Russia was at the time the world's third-largest naval power. While the Japanese fleet at Tsushima lost only three torpedo boats under Tōgō's command, of the 36 Russian warships that went into action, 22 were sunk (including seven battleships), six were captured, six were interned in neutral ports and only three escaped to the safety of Vladivostok.

Tsushima broke Russian naval dominance in East Asia, and is said to have been a contributing factor in subsequent uprisings in the Russian Navy (1905 uprisings in Vladivostok and the battleship Potemkin uprising), contributing to the Russian Revolution of 1905. Post-war investigations were held into Russian naval leaders during those battles in which Tōgō had prevailed, seeking the reasons behind their utter defeat. The Russian commander of the destroyed Baltic fleet, Admiral Zinovy Rozhestvensky (who was badly wounded in the battle) attempted to take full responsibility for the disaster, and the authorities (and rulers of Russia) acquitted him at his trial. However, they made Admiral Nikolai Nebogatov, who had tried to blame the Russian government, a scapegoat. Nebogatov was found guilty and sentenced to ten years' imprisonment in a fortress, but was released by the tsar after serving only two years.

== Later life ==
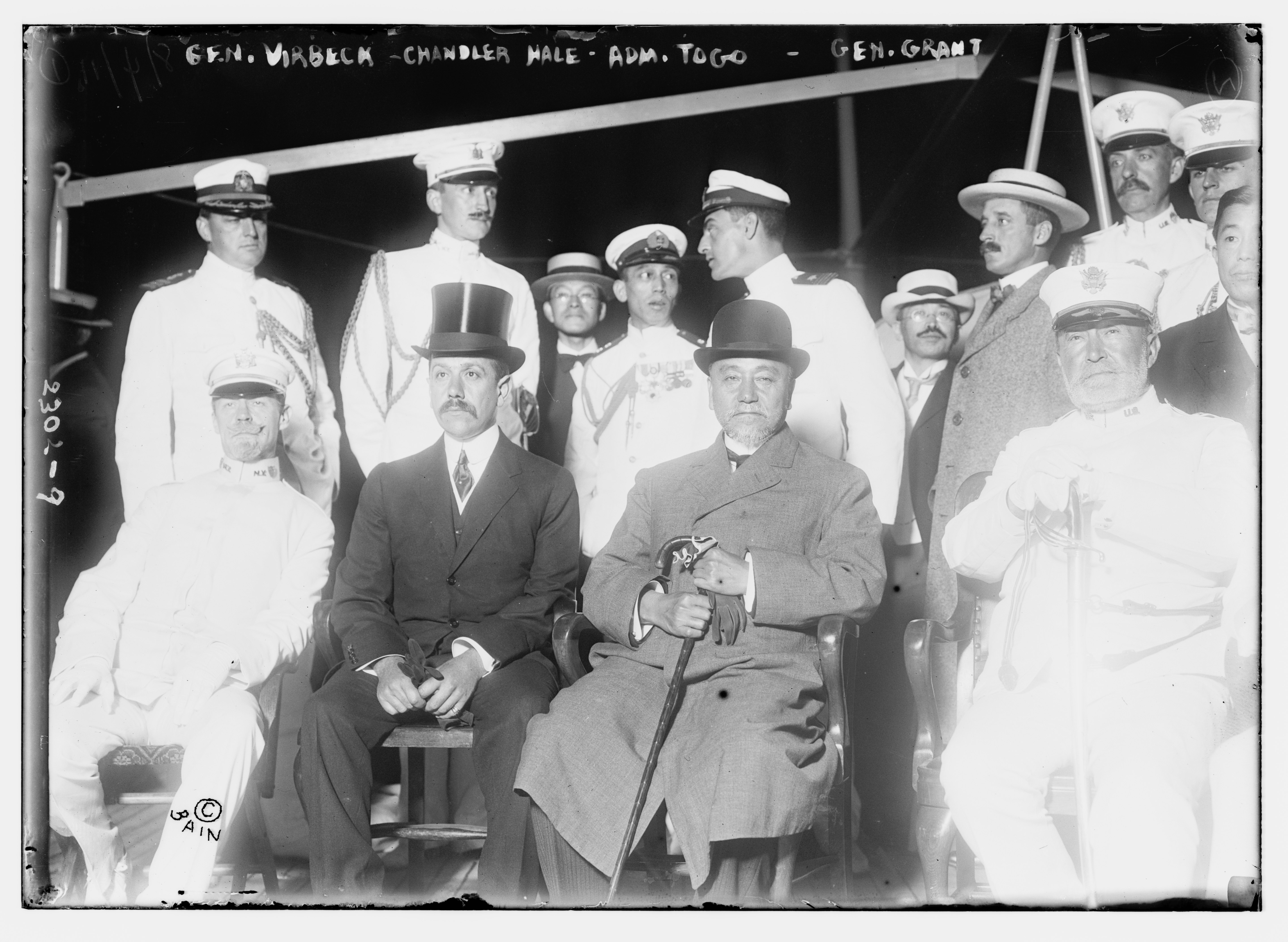
Tōgō with William Verbeck, Assistant secretary of state Chandler Hale, and Major General Frederick D. Grant on board RMS Lusitania

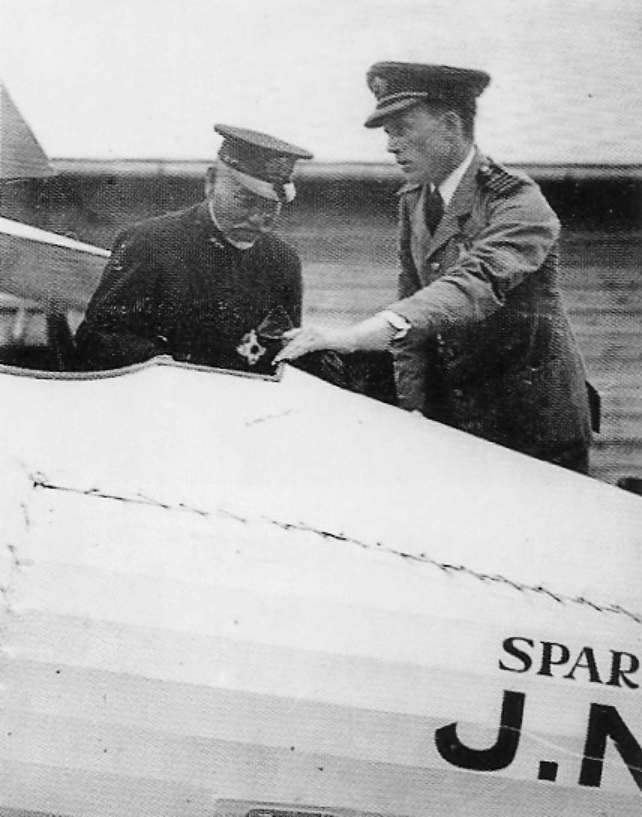
Captain William Forbes-Sempill showing a Sparrowhawk to Gensui Count Tōgō (as he was at the time) in 1921.

Tōgō kept his journals in English, and wrote, "I am firmly convinced that I am the re-incarnation of Horatio Nelson." In 1906, he was made a Member of the British Order of Merit by King Edward VII.

Tōgō was Chief of the Naval General Staff and was given the title of hakushaku (Count) under the kazoku peerage system. He also served as a member of the Supreme War Council. In 1911, Tōgō returned to England for the first time in over 30 years to attend the coronation of King George V, the Coronation Fleet Review at Portsmouth, and naval alumni dinners and to visit dockyards on the Clyde and in Newcastle. He presented the original Z flag from Tsushima to Britain's Marine Society during this visit; it has remained in the Society's keeping in Worcester since. (Note: This detail is sourced to a photo caption rather than a dedicated historical account and would benefit from a stronger source, such as a statement from the Marine Society or Tōgō Shrine, before being treated as fully settled.)

In 1913, Admiral Tōgō received the honorific title of Marshal-Admiral, which is roughly equivalent to the rank of Grand Admiral or Admiral of the Fleet in other navies. From 1914 to 1924, Gensui Tōgō was put in charge of the education of Crown Prince Hirohito, the future Shōwa Emperor, succeeding General Nogi Maresuke in that role after Nogi's ritual suicide on the day of Emperor Meiji's funeral in 1912. As head of the Tōgū-gogakumonsho, the Office for the Crown Prince's Studies, Tōgō set the course of study and oversaw a staff of seventeen instructors, and became a regular travelling companion to the young prince; by some accounts Hirohito never grew quite as close to Tōgō as he had been to Nogi.

Tōgō publicly expressed a dislike and lack of interest for involvement in politics; however, he did make strong statements against the London Naval Treaty.

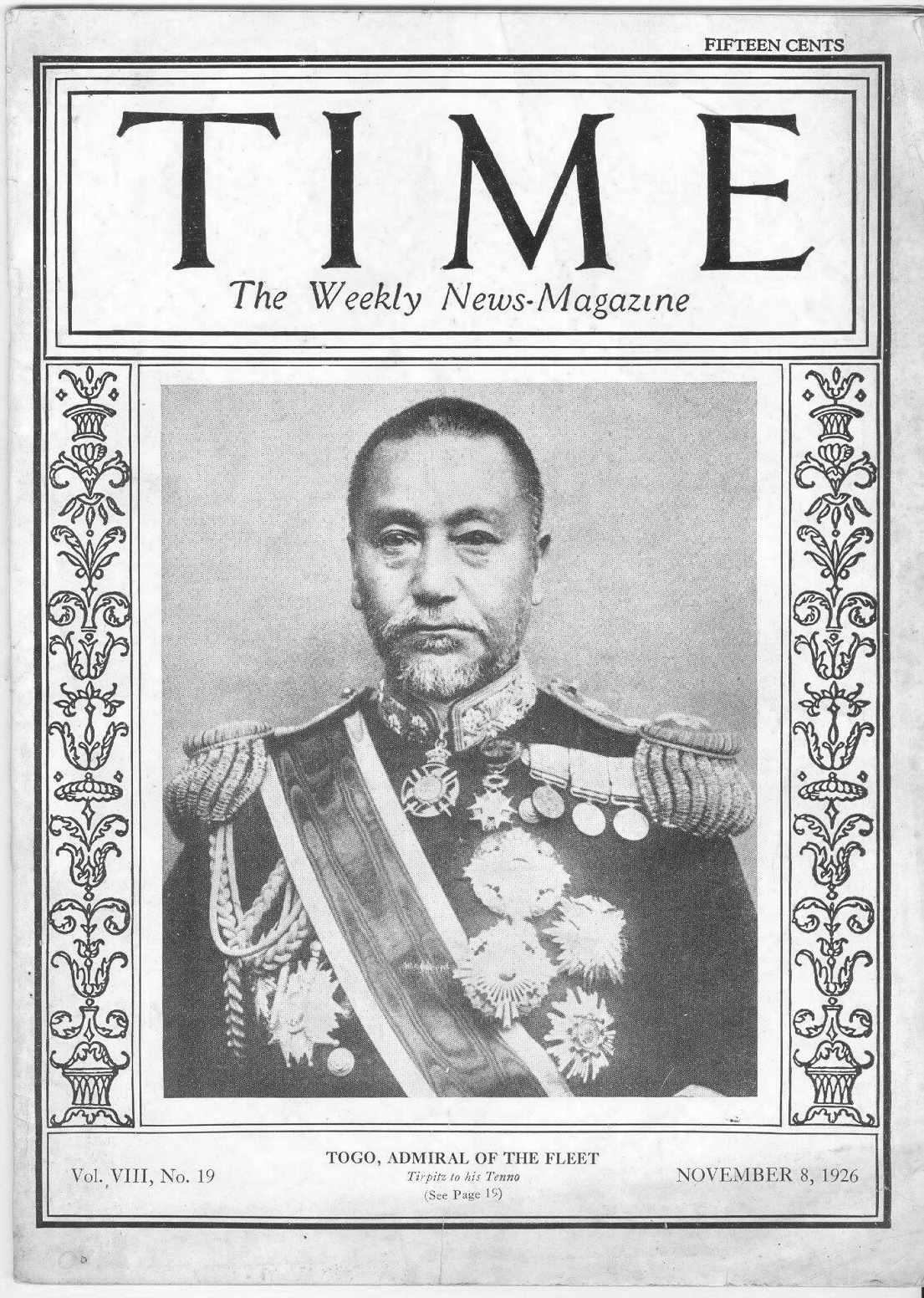
Tōgō on Time magazine cover, 1926

Tōgō was awarded the Collar of the Supreme Order of the Chrysanthemum in 1926, an honour that was held only by Emperor Hirohito and Prince Kan'in Kotohito at the time; the award made him Japan's most decorated naval officer ever. He added the award to his existing Order of the Golden Kite (1st class) and already existing Order of the Chrysanthemum. His peerage was raised to that of kōshaku (marquis) in 1934, a day before his death.

Admiral Tōgō died at 6:35 am on 30 May 1934, of throat cancer at the age of 86. He was accorded a state funeral. The navies of the United Kingdom, United States, Netherlands, France, Italy and China all sent representatives and ships to a naval parade in his honour in Tokyo Bay.

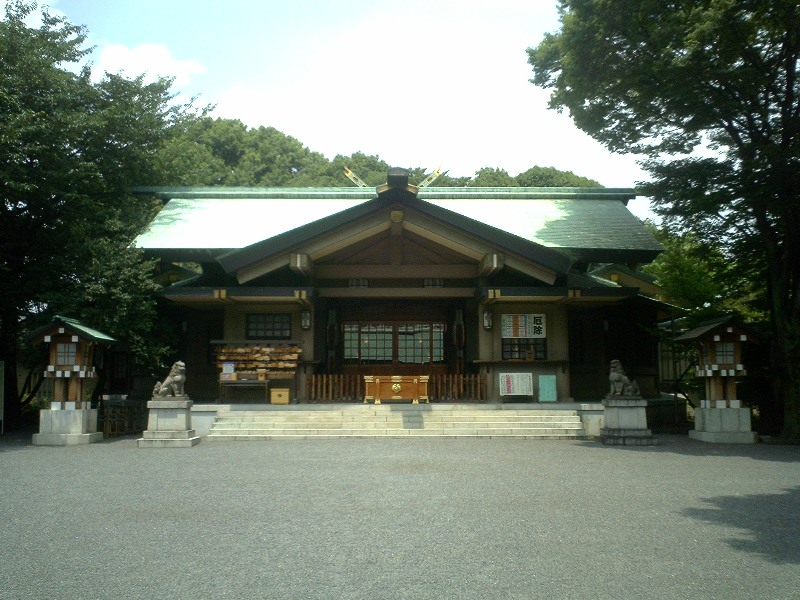
The Tōgō Shrine, Harajuku, Tokyo

In 1940, Tōgō Jinja was built in Harajuku, Tokyo, as the naval rival to the Nogi Shrine erected in the honour of Imperial Japanese Army General Nogi Maresuke. The idea of elevating him to a Shinto kami had been discussed before his death, and he had been vehemently opposed to the idea. There is another Tōgō shrine at Tsuyazaki, Fukuoka. The statues to him in Japan include one at Ontaku Shrine, in Agano, Saitama and one in front of the memorial battleship Mikasa in Yokosuka.

Tōgō's son and grandson also served in the Imperial Japanese Navy. His grandson died in combat during the Pacific War on the heavy cruiser Maya at the Battle of Leyte Gulf.

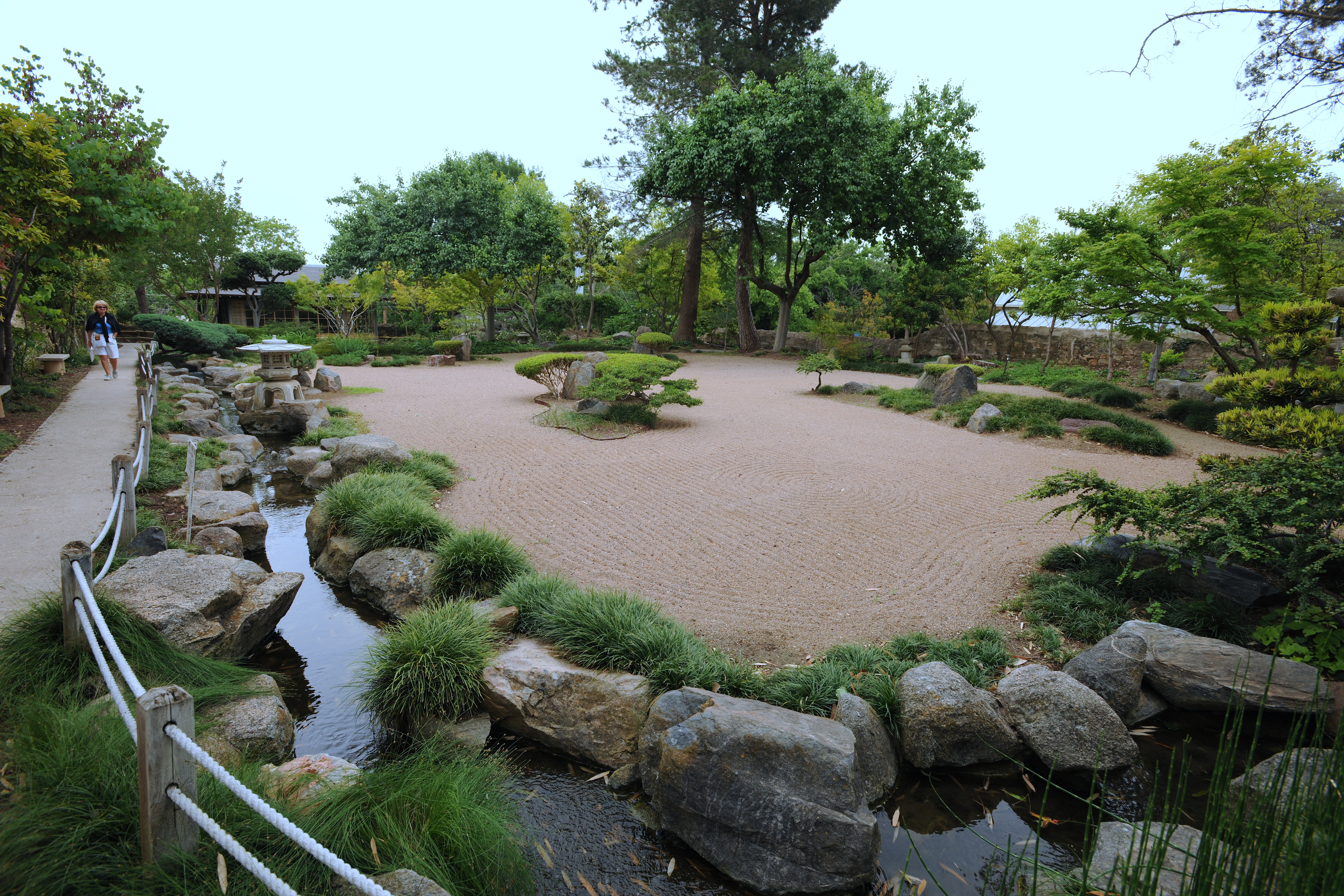
The "Garden of Peace"

In 1958, Fleet Admiral Chester Nimitz, an admirer of Tōgō, helped to finance the restoration of the Mikasa, Admiral Tōgō's flagship during the Russo-Japanese war. In exchange, Japanese craftsmen created the Japanese Garden of Peace, a replica of Marshal-Admiral Tōgō's garden, at the National Museum of the Pacific War (formerly known as The Nimitz Museum) in Fredericksburg, Texas.

== Honours ==
Incorporates information from the corresponding Japanese Wikipedia article

=== Tōgō's career promotions ===
Ranks

- Midshipman: 11 December 1870
- Ensign: 1 August 1871
- Sublieutenant: 3 July 1878
- Lieutenant: 27 December 1878
- Lieutenant Commander: 27 December 1879
- Commander: 20 June 1885
- Captain: 10 July 1886
- Rear Admiral: 16 February 1895
- Vice Admiral: 14 May 1898
- Admiral: 6 June 1904
- Grand Admiral: 21 April 1913

Titles

- Count: 21 September 1907
- Marquess: 29 May 1934

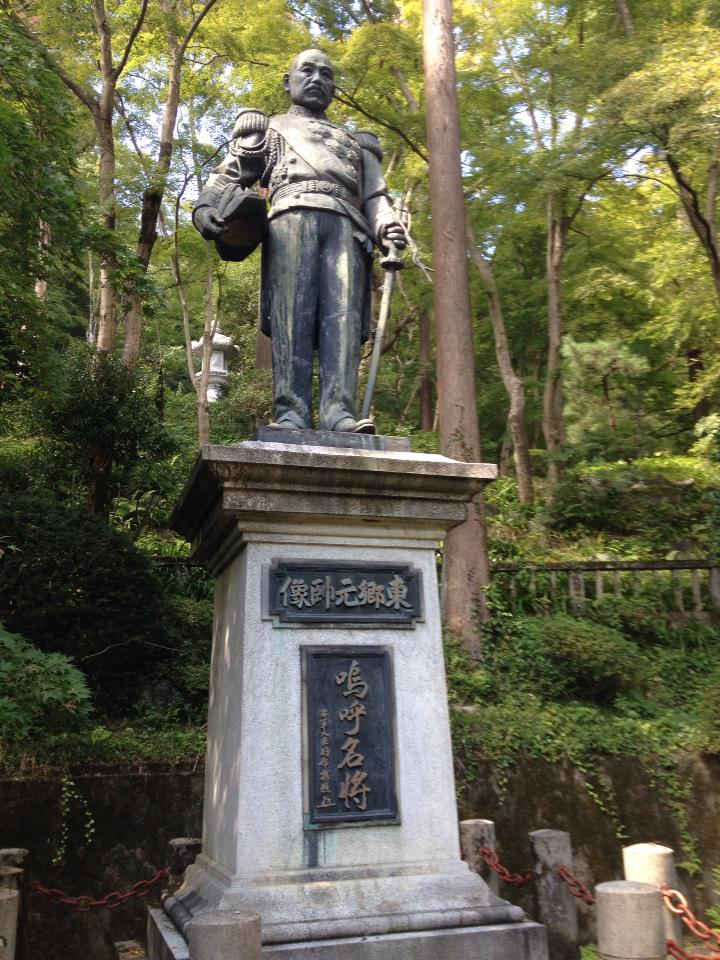
Statue of Tōgō Heihachirō (Chichibu Ontake Shrine)

=== Japanese ===
==== Peerages ====
- Count (21 September 1907)
- Marquess (29 May 1934)

==== Decorations ====
- Grand Cordon of the Order of the Sacred Treasure (likely before 1901)
  - Third Class of the Order of the Sacred Treasure (9 May 1899)
  - Fifth Class of the Order of the Sacred Treasure (26 May 1893)
  - Sixth Class of the Order of the Sacred Treasure (22 November 1889)
- Grand Cordon of the Order of the Rising Sun (19 July 1901)
  - Fourth Class of the Order of the Rising Sun (20 August 1895)
- Grand Cordon of the Order of the Golden Kite (1 April 1906)
  - Fourth Class of the Order of the Golden Kite (20 August 1895)
- Collar of the Order of the Chrysanthemum (11 November 1926)
  - Grand Cordon of the Order of the Chrysanthemum (1 April 1906)

==== Court order of precedence ====
- Junior First Rank (30 May 1934; posthumously; Senior second rank: 20 November 1918; Second rank: 30 October 1911; Senior third rank: 1906; Third rank: 30 September 1903; Fourth rank: 10 June 1898; Senior fifth rank: 28 March 1895; Fifth rank: 1 November 1890; Senior sixth rank: 16 September 1885)

=== Foreign ===
- Belgium: Grand Cordon in the Order of Leopold (1907)
- Empire of Korea: Grand Collar of the Order of the Golden Ruler (the then highest decoration) (1906)
- United Kingdom: Member of the Order of Merit (OM) (21 February 1906)
- United Kingdom: Honorary Knight Grand Cross of the Royal Victorian Order (GCVO)
- Kingdom of Italy: Knight Grand Cross of the Order of Saints Maurice and Lazarus
- France: Grand Officer of the Legion of Honour
- Poland: Grand Cross of the Order of Polonia Restituta
- Russian Empire: Order of St. Anna, 1st Class
- Spain: Grand Cross of the Order of Naval Merit (1925)

The village of Togo, Saskatchewan, Canada was named in his honor. Until 1992, Pyynikin Brewery in Tampere, Finland produced the Amiraali beer brand, which is popular with the local population and is still available in Japan with a label with the image of Tōgō Heihachirō.

== Family ==
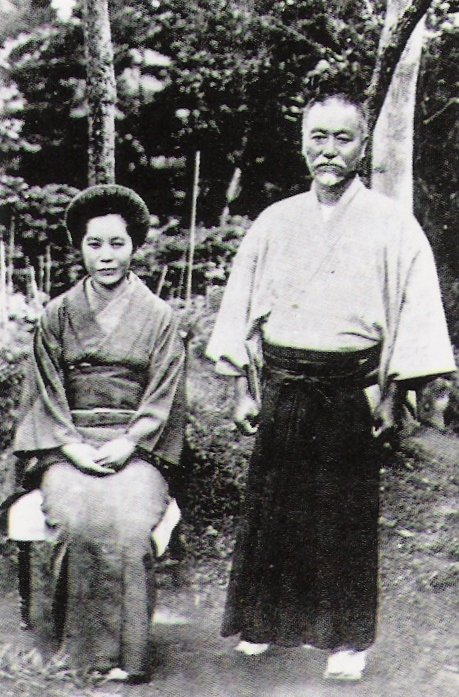
Tōgō with his wife Tetsu, in 1913

Tōgō's wife was Kaieda Tetsu (1861–1934). The couple had two sons; the elder son, Hyō (1885–1969), succeeded his father as the second Marquis Tōgō in 1934 and held the title until the kazoku was abolished in 1947. The younger, Rear-Admiral Tōgō Minoru (1890–1962) followed his father into the navy, rising to the rank of rear-admiral and ending his career in 1943 as commander of the naval district in Fukuoka. His elder son Ryōichi, who became a naval lieutenant, was killed in action during the Second World War aboard the heavy cruiser Maya. Neither Tōgō Minoru nor Tōgō Ryōichi had the same naval 'inclinations' as their famous ancestor; Tōgō Minoru placed 142nd out of 144 cadets in the Naval Academy's 40th Class, while Tōgō Ryōichi graduated dead-last (625th out of 625 cadets) in the Naval Academy's 72nd Class.

Tōgō Hyō married Ohara Haruko (1899–1985); the couple had one son, Kazuo (1919–1991) and two daughters, Ryōko (1917–1972) and Momoko (1925–). Kazuo married Amano Tamiko and had three daughters, Kikuko (1948–), Shoko (1952–) and Muneko (1956–). As Kazuo and his wife never had sons, to perpetuate the Tōgō name they adopted their son-in-law, Maruyama Yoshio (1942–), the husband of Kikuko. Kikuko and Yoshio have two sons; the elder, Yoshihisa (1971–), married Niimi Miyuki and has two sons, Ryūta (1991–) and Masahei (1993–).

Minoru married Akazaki Yae, and had three sons and a daughter, Ryōichi, Chūzō, Kenzō and Hisako. Kenzō's son, Hiroshige Tōgō is a retired captain (一等海佐) of JMSDF.

Japanese voice actress Kaede Hondo is a descendant of the Admiral himself, having acknowledged her connection in a radio talk show in 2019.

== In popular culture ==
Tōgō's success in the Russo-Japanese War was seen as a source of inspiration for some Turks. Halide Edip Adıvar, a Turkish journalist and nationalist who was among the founders of modern Turkey, named one of her children Togo.

Tōgō was portrayed by Toshiro Mifune in the 1969 Japanese film The Battle of the Japan Sea (日本海大海戦), directed by Seiji Maruyama.

In the miniseries Reilly, Ace of Spies, Tōgō is portrayed by Robert Ya Fu Lee.

In the game Civilization VI Togo Heihachiro is portrayed as a great admiral that can be earned and used in naval warfare.

In the game Supremacy:1914 Tōgō Heihachirō can be earned and used as a special "Hero" unit. He is portrayed as a special Battleship unit with extra abilities

== See also ==
- Anglo-Japanese relations
- Japanese battleship Mikasa – Tōgō's flagship at the Battle of Tsushima
- Japanese Garden of Peace – has a house similar to one owned by Admiral Marquis Togo Heihachiro
- List of people on the cover of Time magazine (1920s) – 8 November 1926
- Togo – Siberian Husky sled dog named after Japanese admiral Tōgō
- Togo, Saskatchewan

Russo-Japanese War

== Notes ==
Military offices
| Preceded by Tsuboi Kōzō | Naval War College; Headmaster; 23 March 1896 – 5 November 1896 | Succeeded by Samejima Kazunori |
| Preceded by Samejima Kazunori | Naval War College; Headmaster; 1 February 1898 – 19 January 1899 | Succeeded by Shibayama Yahachi |
| Preceded by Aiura Norimichi | Sasebo Naval District; Commander-in-chief; 19 January 1899 – 20 May 1900 | Succeeded by Samejima Kazunori |
| Preceded by Samejima Kazunori | Standing Fleet; Commander-in-chief; 20 May 1900 – 1 October 1901 | Succeeded by Tsunoda Hidematsu |
| Post Created | Maizuru Naval District; Commander-in-chief; 1 October 1901 – 19 October 1903 | Succeeded by Hidaka Sōnojō |
| Preceded by Hidaka Sōnojō | Standing Fleet; Commander-in-chief; 19 October 1903 – 28 December 1903 | Fleet Dissolved |
| Combined Fleet; Fleet recreated; post last held by Arichi Shinanojō | Combined Fleet & 1st Fleet; Commander-in-chief; 28 December 1903 – 20 December 1905 | Combined Fleet; Fleet dissolved; post next held by Ijūin Gorō |
| 1st Fleet; Fleet Created | Combined Fleet & 1st Fleet; Commander-in-chief; 28 December 1903 – 20 December 1905 | 1st Fleet; Kataoka Shichirō |
| Preceded by Itō Sukeyuki | Navy General Staff; Chairman; 20 December 1905 – 1 December 1909 | Succeeded by Ijūin Gorō |
