= Hidaka Sōnojō =

Baron Hidaka Sōnojō
- 日高 壮之丞
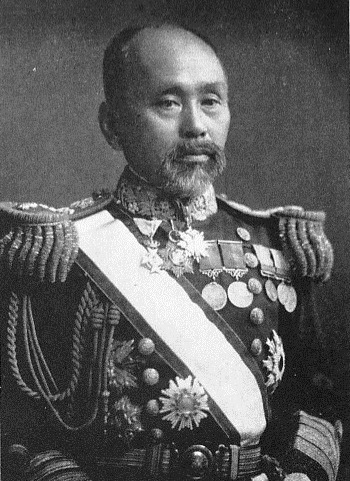
- Born: April 26, 1848; Kagoshima, Satsuma Domain, Japan
- Died: July 24, 1932 (aged 84); Tokyo, Japan
- Military career
- Allegiance: Empire of Japan
- Branch: Imperial Japanese Navy
- Service years: 1870–1909
- Rank: Admiral
- Conflicts: First Sino-Japanese War; Russo-Japanese War

Baron Hidaka Sōnojō (日高 壮之丞; 26 April 1848 – 24 July 1932) was an admiral of the early modern Imperial Japanese Navy, known primarily for his role in the First Sino-Japanese War.

== Biography ==
Hidaka was the second son of a samurai in the service of the Shimazu clan of Satsuma Domain, and was born in Kagoshima.

In 1870, he enrolled in the 2nd class of the Imperial Japanese Naval Academy and as a cadet was part of the team which brought the corvette Tsukuba from its shipyards in England back to Japan in 1871. Over the next 20 years, he rose steadily through the ranks, serving on the paddle steamer warship Kasuga (1876), corvette Nisshin (1876), Fusō (1878),Kenko (1879), Ryūjō (1880), and Asama (1881). In 1882, he was assigned to the Shipbuilding Bureau of the Imperial Japanese Navy General Staff, but continued to simultaneously serve on Fusō (1884) and Amagi (1884) and Seiki (1885).

Hidaka returned to the Navy General Staff in 1886, and was sent to Europe in 1887–1888. He returned to sea as captain of the corvette Kongō, his first command, in 1890. He was captain of Musashi in 1891 and Fusō in 1892. After a year as commandant of the Naval Artillery School from 1893 to 1894, he was appointed captain of the cruiser Hashidate during the First Sino-Japanese War, participating in the Battle of the Yalu. He was then assigned to command Matsushima in 1895, a post he held simultaneously with that of commandant of the Imperial Japanese Naval Academy, since Matsushima was under repairs for damages suffered during the war for most of this time.

Hidaka was promoted to rear admiral in 1896 and became commander in chief of the Readiness Fleet in 1898. He was promoted to vice admiral in 1900, and became commander of the Takeshiki Guard District. He returned to command the Readiness Fleet again from 1902 to 1903, and was then appointed commander of the Maizuru Naval District.

With the start of the Russo-Japanese War, Hidaka was in line for promotion to command the Combined Fleet against the Imperial Russian Navy. However, Minister of the Navy Yamamoto Gonnohyōe selected Tōgō Heihachirō instead. When questioned about his decision by Emperor Meiji, Yamamoto replied that it was because "Togo was lucky".

Hidaka was ennobled with the title of baron (danshaku) under the kazoku peerage system in 1907, and was promoted to full admiral in 1908. He retired from active service in 1909, and from the reserves in 1918. He died in 1932.

Hidaka's grandson Moriyasu followed him into the Navy, graduating with the Naval Academy's 66th Class in 1938, ranking 76th of 219 cadets. He became a fighter pilot and operated from various aircraft carriers throughout the Pacific War, eventually achieving the rank of Lieutenant Commander. Later, he joined the Japan Air Self-Defense Force and retired from that branch as a Colonel. He died on 15 July 2010.

== In popular culture ==
In the semi-historical television adaption of Ryōtarō Shiba's Saka no ue no kumo role of Hidaka was played by veteran actor Akira Nakao

== Notes ==
Military offices
Preceded by Tōgō Heihachirō	Maizuru Naval District; Commander-in-chief; 19 October 1903 - 28 August 1908	Succeeded by Kataoka Shichirō
