= Samejima =

Samejima (written: 鮫島 lit. "Shark Island") is a Japanese surname. Notable people with the surname include:

- Kazunori Samejima (鮫島員規) (1845–1910), Imperial Japanese Navy admiral
- Tomoshige Samejima (鮫島具重) (1889–1966), Imperial Japanese Navy admiral

Notable fictional characters with the surname include:

- Mamimi Samejima (サメジマ マミ実), character from the anime series FLCL
