= Standing Fleet =

Japanese naval fleet (1889–1903)

- 常備艦隊
- Active: 24 July 1889 – 10 March 1903
- Country: Empire of Japan
- Branch: Imperial Japanese Navy

Commanders
- Notable commanders: Ito Sukeyuki; Heihachiro Togo

The Standing Fleet (also known as the Readiness Fleet) (常備艦隊, Jōbi Kantai) was a fleet of the Imperial Japanese Navy. It was the main combat fleet of the Japanese Navy and formed the core of a wartime Combined Fleet organization. It was created from the Standing Small-Fleet in 1889. It was split into the 1st Fleet and the 2nd Fleet in 1903.

== History ==
On 24 July 1889 the Fleet Ordinance (Edict No. 100) was enacted as the first independent fleet-related decree of the Japanese Navy, and the fleet was to be composed of three or more warships. On 29 July 1889 the Standing Small-Fleet was reorganized into the Standing Fleet (commander-in-chief: Rear Admiral Inoue Yoshika).

On 19 June 1894, in response to the deterioration of Japan-China relations, all fleet regulations were revised (Edict No. 71), and torpedo boats and transport vessels were attached to the fleet as specified by the Edict. The edict also stipulated that the staff should be enhanced and that ships could be dispatched outside the patrol areas. On 13 July a Guard Fleet consisting of nine outdated ships and small ships with a flagship Katsuragi was formed, and on 19 July it was renamed the Western Sea Fleet. On the same day a Combined Fleet was formed by the Standing Fleet and the Western Sea Fleet. The commander-in-chief of the Combined Fleet was also the commander-in-chief of the Standing Fleet, Vice Admiral Ito Sukeyuki, and the staff of the Combined Fleet was also the staff of the Standing Fleet.

After the end of the First Sino-Japanese War the Combined Fleet and the Western Sea Fleet were disbanded on 15 November 1895. On 14 October 1897 the Fleet Ordinance was amended (Edict No. 356) to allow the fleet to consist of two or more warships, including a torpedo boat division, mine laying division, and transport vessels. A chief of staff position was also created at this time.

On 10 March 1903, during the 4th Great Navy Exercise, the 1st and 2nd Fleets were temporarily formed, and on 10 April 1903 after the exercise, a fleet review ceremony was held off the coast of Kobe. On 28 December 1903 the Standing Fleet was disbanded and permanently divided into the 1st Fleet and the 2nd Fleet. The last commander-in-chief of the Standing Fleet was Heihachiro Togo.

== Organization ==
29 July 1889, organization at the time of creation

- Cruisers Naniwa (Flagship), Takachiho, Takao, ironclad Fusō, corvettes Katsuragi, Yamato

19 July 1894, organization as part of the Combined Fleet

- Cruisers Matsushima (Flagship), Naniwa, Yoshino, Chiyoda, Itsukushima, Hashidate, Takachiho, Akitsushima, ironclads Hiei, Fusō
  - Aviso: Yaeyama
  - Attached warships: Tsukushi, Banjō, Atago, Maya, Chōkai, Amagi
  - Attached transports: Yamashiro Maru, Omi Maru
  - Fleet torpedo boats: Kotaka, 7, 12, 13, 22, 23
  - Torpedo boat tender: Chikushi

31 March 1896, organization after the Sino-Japanese War

- Hashidate (Flagship), Itsukushima, Chiyoda, Izumi, Takao, Atago, Tenryū, Maya, Yamato, Chokai, Kaimon, Sōkō

Organization after special inspection on 22 April 1902

- Battleships Hatsuse, Fuji, Asahi
- Cruisers Tokiwa, Yakumo, Chihaya, Chitose, Akashi, Miyako
- Asama, Takasago, Akagi, Chikushi, Izumi, Atago, Ōshima, Takao

== Commanders-in-Chief ==
- Rear Admiral Yoshika Inoue: July 29, 1889-
- Rear Admiral Arichi Shinanojo: June 17, 1891-
- Rear Admiral Norimichi Aiura: December 12, 1892-
- Vice Admiral Ito Sukeyuki: May 20, 1893-* (July 19, 1894-, concurrently serving as Commander-in-Chief of the Combined Fleet)
- Vice Admiral Arichi Shinanojo: May 11, 1895-* (concurrently serving as Commander-in-Chief of the Combined Fleet)
- Vice Admiral Inoue Yoshika: November 16, 1895-
- Vice Admiral Kozo Tsuboi: February 26, 1896-
- Vice Admiral Norimichi Aiura: April 9, 1897-
- Vice Admiral Shibayama Yahachi: October 8, 1897-
- Vice Admiral Samejima Kazunori: January 19, 1899-
- Vice Admiral Heihachiro Togo: May 20, 1900-
- Vice Admiral Hide Matsuda: October 1, 1901-
- Vice Admiral Hidaka Sōnojō: July 26, 1902-
- Vice Admiral Heihachiro Togo: October 19, 1903-December 28, fleet disbanded

== Chiefs of Staff ==
- Captain Samejima Kazunori: June 19, 1894-* (July 19, 1894-, concurrently serving as Chief of Staff of the Combined Fleet)
- Captain Dewa Shigetō: December 17, 1894-* Concurrently serving as Chief of Staff of the Combined Fleet
- Captain Kamimura Hikonojō: July 25, 1895-* (November 16, 1895, concurrently serving as Chief of Staff of the Combined Fleet)
- Captain Katsumi Miyoshi: December 27, 1897-
- Captain Kataoka Shichirō: November 2, 1898-
- Captain Kitaro Endo: February 1, 1899-
- Captain Shigetarō Yoshimatsu: May 21, 1900-
- Captain Hayao Shimamura: July 4, 1900-
- Captain Hikojiro Ichi: December 6, 1900-
- Captain Katō Tomosaburō: June 11, 1902-
- Captain Hayao Shimamura: October 27, 1903-December 28, fleet disbanded
