= Japanese Garden of Peace =

Coordinates: 30°16′21″N 98°52′00″W

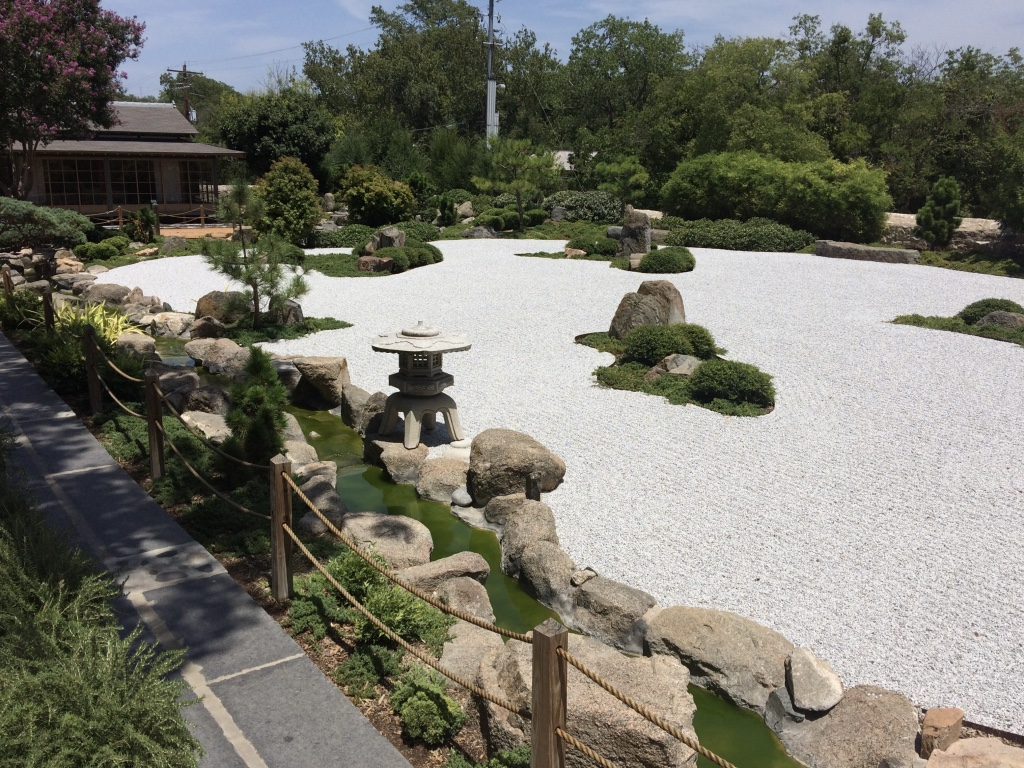
Japanese Garden of Peace in Fredericksburg, Texas

The Japanese Garden of Peace is a peace garden installed at the National Museum of the Pacific War in Fredericksburg, Texas.

== Background ==
The Japanese Garden of Peace was designed by Taketora Saita of Tokyo and constructed during 1976 at Fleet Admiral Chester W. Nimitz's boyhood home. The Nimitz home is part of the museum complex which includes the National Museum of the Pacific War. The traditional garden is a gift from the people of Japan to the people of America, part of the reconciliation between the United States and Japan and to honor the friendship between Admiral Nimitz and Admiral Heihachiro Togo.

After construction funds were raised in Japan, Japanese craftsmen traveled to Texas to build the garden. The finished, $400,000 renovation was opened and dedicated on the 130th founding of Fredericksburg, May 8, 1976. The Admiral Nimitz Foundation is a member of the North American Japanese Garden Association and employs a full-time, properly trained gardener who maintains the facility.

== Design and purpose ==
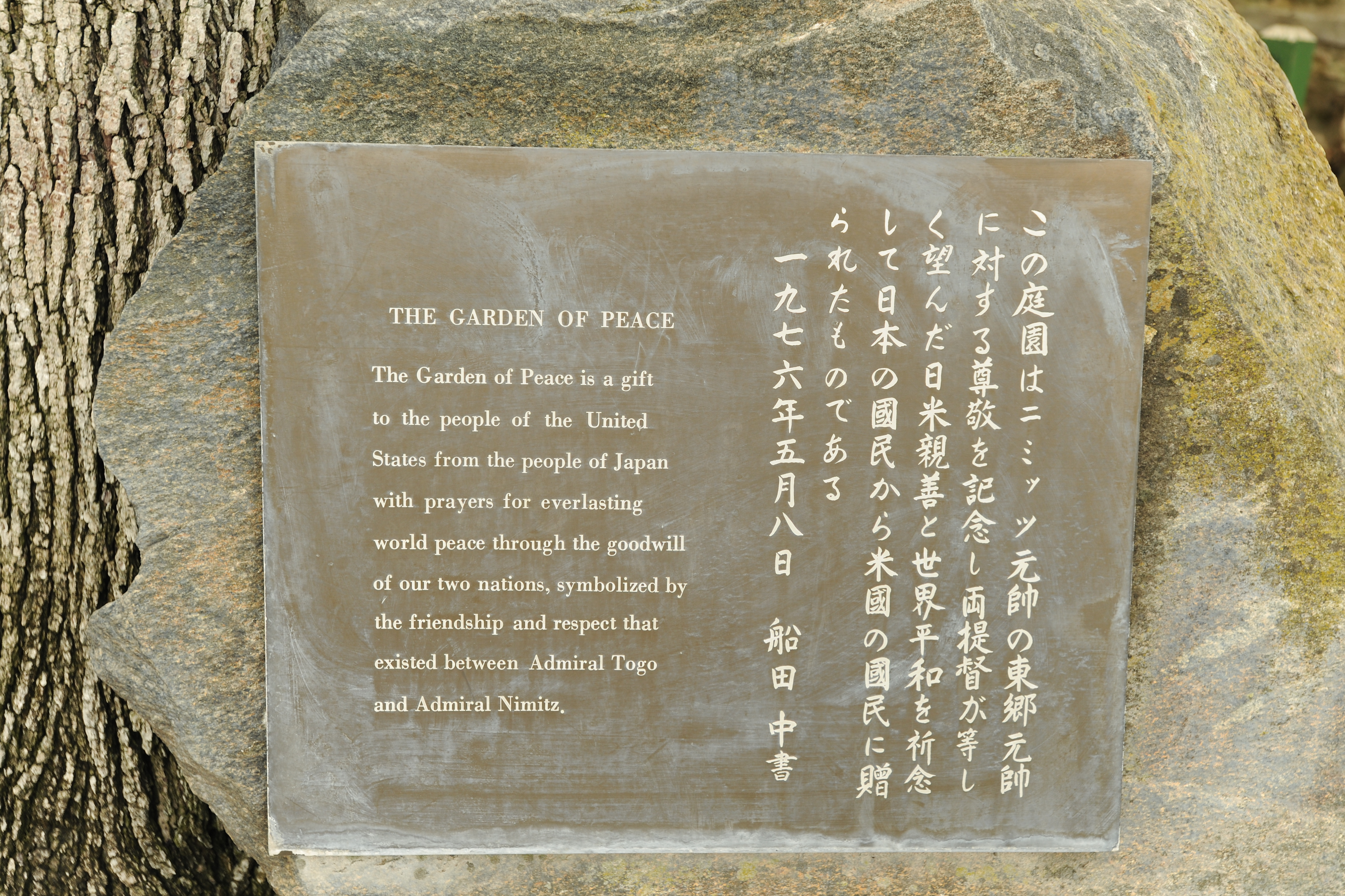
Japanese Peace Garden

The National Museum of the Pacific War's evocative character of war's destruction and death purposefully stands in juxtaposition of the garden's quiet setting. Taketora remarked, "It is my hope that as the Admiral Nimitz Park is visited by people from all parts of the world, it will be praised as a small oasis of cool, green beauty in Texas. The prayers of many people, those who gave money as well as those who had a part in building the garden, are directed to this objective."

There are many elements in the garden which contain symbolic meaning. Water features represent such notions as loyalty, purifying actions, and one heart. These representations are achieved through the arrangement and shapes of the various elements. An example of this technique is Taketora’s use of field stones he found in Fredericksburg: he mingled them with various plantings on a furrowed expanse of white pebbles. The furrowed pebbles are to remind one of Pacific Ocean waves and to represent the Pacific Ocean’s joining of Japan and the United States. Pacific islands are symbolized with the field stones.

The locally sourced field stones are also evidence of Taketora’s desire to not overwhelm the garden with Japanese influences. He muted that influence in various ways, including planting a mix of American grown trees which were given by Fredericksburg residents.

A lone, square meditation structure with the qualities of an early 1900s Taisho Era house sits at one end of the park. It is similar to one in the city of Maizuru, Japan. It includes traditional shoji screens and joinery methods done without nails. At one time, the original structure in Maizuru was owned by Admiral Marquis Togo Heihachiro of the Imperial Japanese Navy.
