= Shibayama Yahachi =

Baron Shibayama Yahachi
- 柴山 矢八
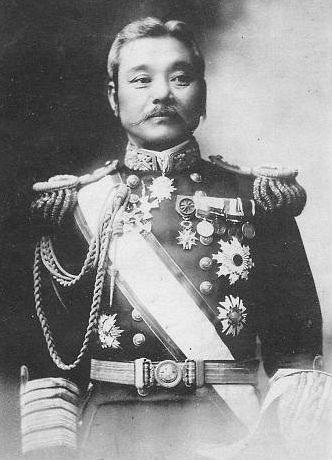
- Born: July 13, 1850; Kagoshima, Satsuma domain, Japan
- Died: January 1, 1927 (aged 76); Tokyo, Japan
- Military career
- Allegiance: Empire of Japan
- Branch: Imperial Japanese Navy
- Service years: 1874–1920
- Rank: Admiral
- Commands: Tsukuba, Kaimon, Takachiho, Yokosuka Naval District, Imperial Japanese Naval Academy, Sasebo Naval District, Readiness Fleet, Kure Naval District, Ryojun Naval District
- Conflicts: Anglo-Satsuma War; Satsuma Rebellion; First Sino-Japanese War; Russo-Japanese War

Baron Shibayama Yahachi (柴山 矢八; 13 July 1850 – 1 January 1927) was an admiral in the early Imperial Japanese Navy.

== Biography ==
Born in Kagoshima, Satsuma domain, (present day Kagoshima prefecture), Shibayama participated as a Satsuma samurai in the Anglo-Satsuma War in his youth. Although a close friend of Togo Heihachiro, he declined to join the military and did not participate in the Boshin War to overthrow the Tokugawa Shogunate. However, after the Meiji Restoration, and the establishment of the new Meiji government in Tokyo he enrolled in the government's development and colonization program, and was sent to the United States for two years from 1872.

On Shibayama's return to Japan, he entered the fledgling Imperial Japanese Navy as a naval artillery specialist. He fought in the Satsuma Rebellion in an artillery battalion, and served briefly as a crewman on the Asama and Tsukuba. He was in charge of torpedo development from 1879–1883, and is called the “father of the Japanese torpedo”.

Promoted to captain in 1885, Shibayama went to the United States and Europe in 1886 together with Saigō Tsugumichi, and on his return was promoted to acting director of the Armaments Department within the Ministry of the Navy of Japan, much to the outrage and opposition of Admiral Yamamoto Gonnohyōe. Perhaps for this reason, he was given command of the corvette Tsukuba on 15 May 1889 and sent to sea for two years. Afterwards, he was assigned command of Kaimon, the cruiser Takachiho, Yokosuka Naval District, and the Imperial Japanese Naval Academy before being appointed commander-in-chief of the Sasebo Naval District.

Shibayama was promoted to rear admiral on 30 July 1894 in time for the First Sino-Japanese War. He became vice admiral and commander-in-chief of the Readiness Fleet on 10 August 1897.

He was commander-in-chief of the Kure Naval District from 20 May 1900, through the end of the Russo-Japanese War.

After the war, on 7 January 1905, he became commander-in-chief of the new Ryojun Naval District. It was here that his abilities as an administrator and as an engineer found their perfect match. Shibayama was instrumental in raising the sunken Russian Pacific Fleet from the bottom of Port Arthur harbor, salvaging the badly damaged warships, and placing them into service with the Imperial Japanese Navy. Shibayama was promoted to full admiral on 13 November 1905 and elevated to the rank of danshaku (baron) under the kazoku peerage system on 21 September 1907.

Shibayama went into the reserves in 1915 and retired completely in 1920. His grave is at the Tama Cemetery in Tokyo.

== Notes ==
Military offices
Preceded by Aiura Norimichi	Sasebo Naval District; Commander-in-chief; 13 July 1894 - 8 October 1897	Succeeded by Aiura Norimichi
Preceded by Tōgō Heihachirō	Naval War College; Headmaster; 19 January 1899 - 20 May 1900	Succeeded by Sakamoto Toshiatsu
Preceded by Inoue Yoshika	Kure Naval District; Commander-in-chief; 20 May 1900 - 6 February 1905	Succeeded by Arima Shinichi
Command created	Ryōjun Port Naval District; Commander-in-chief; 6 February 1905 - 2 February 1906	Succeeded by Misu Sōtarō
