= Samejima Kazunori =

Japanese admiral (1845–1910)

Baron Samejima Kazunori
- 鮫島 員規
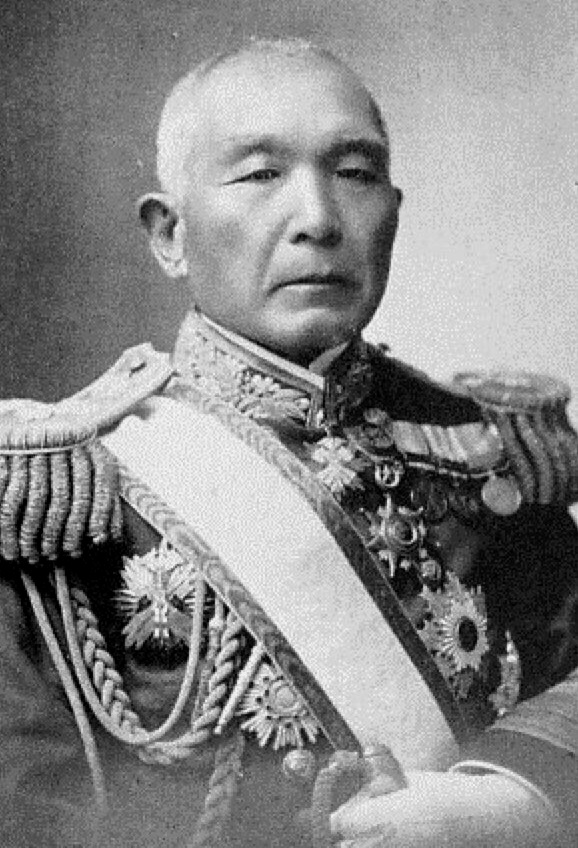
- Born: 14 June 1845; Satsuma Domain, Japan
- Died: 14 October 1910 (aged 65)
- Military career
- Allegiance: Empire of Japan
- Branch: Imperial Japanese Navy
- Service years: 1871–1907
- Rank: Admiral
- Conflicts: Boshin War; Saga Rebellion; Satsuma Rebellion; First Sino-Japanese War; Russo-Japanese War

Baron Samejima Kazunori (鮫島 員規; 14 June 1845 – 14 October 1910) was an admiral in the early Imperial Japanese Navy.

== Biography ==
Samejima was born to a samurai family of Satsuma Domain (present-day Kagoshima Prefecture) and served as a Satsuma samurai in the Boshin War of the Meiji restoration. He entered the fledgling Imperial Japanese Navy in 1871, serving on the corvette Ryūjō and fought against his fellow ex-samurai in the suppression of the Saga Rebellion and the Satsuma Rebellion. Samejima was promoted to lieutenant in 1877, lieutenant commander in 1882, commander in 1886, and captain later that year. He served as executive officer on the corvette Hiei from 1878 through 1884.

Samejima later served as captain of the corvettes Kongō in 1889 and Fusō in 1890. Sent to France in 1891, he oversaw the completion of the cruiser Matsushima and its maiden voyage from France to Japan and remained her captain until 1893.

In May 1893, Samejima was chief-of-staff of Yokosuka Naval District and from June 1894 was chief-of-staff of the Readiness Fleet and of the Combined Fleet from July 1894. During the First Sino-Japanese War, he fought in the Battle of the Yellow Sea. In December 1894, he was promoted to rear admiral.

He subsequently served as Commandant of the Naval Staff College from November 1896, and was promoted to vice admiral in 1897. In February 1898, he became commander-in-chief of the Yokosuka Naval District, and in January 1899 was commander of the Readiness Fleet.

In May 1900 Samejima became commander of the Sasebo Naval District, a post he held throughout the Russo-Japanese War. In 1901, he was awarded the Order of the Rising Sun, 1st class.

Samejima was promoted to admiral in November 1905 and in 1906 was awarded the Order of the Golden Kite, 2nd class. Furthermore, in early 1907, he was ennobled with the title of baron (danshaku) in the kazoku peerage system. He entered the reserves later that year.

His son, Tomoshige Samejima was an admiral in the Imperial Japanese Navy in World War II, and his daughter married admiral Isamu Takeshita.

Military offices
Fleet Created	Combined Fleet; Chief-of-staff; 19 July 1894 - 17 December 1894	Succeeded by Dewa Shigetō
Preceded by Tōgō Heihachirō	Naval War College; Headmaster; 5 November 1896 - 1 February 1898	Succeeded by Tōgō Heihachirō
Preceded by Tsuboi Kōzō	Yokosuka Naval District; Commander-in-chief; 1 February 1898 - 19 January 1899	Succeeded by Aiura Norimichi
Preceded by Tōgō Heihachirō	Sasebo Naval District; Commander-in-chief; 20 May 1900 - 2 February 1906	Succeeded by Arima Shinichi
