= Japanese gunboat Banjō =

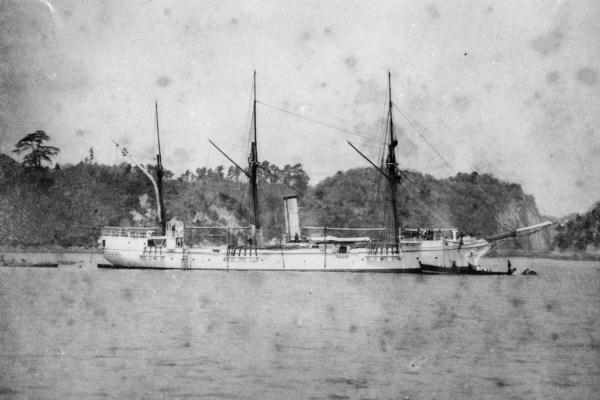
- Japanese gunboat Banjō in 1889

History

Empire of Japan
- Name: Banjō
- Ordered: 1877
- Builder: Yokosuka Naval Arsenal
- Laid down: 1 February 1877
- Launched: 16 July 1878
- Commissioned: 5 July 1880
- Decommissioned: 12 July 1907
- Stricken: 23 May 1911

General characteristics
- Type: Gunboat
- Displacement: 656 long tons (667 t)
- Length: 47.7 m (156 ft)
- Beam: 7.7 m (25 ft 3 in)
- Draught: 3.7 m (12 ft 2 in)
- Propulsion: reciprocating steam engine; 1 shaft, 4 boilers, 659 hp (491 kW)
- Speed: 10.0 knots (11.5 mph; 18.5 km/h)
- Range: 107 tons coal
- Complement: 112
- Armament: 1 × 170 mm (7 in) Krupp breech-loading gun; 1 × 120 mm (4.7 in) Krupp breech-loading gun; 2 × 12-pdr guns; 3 × 25 mm (0.98 in) quadruple Nordenfelt guns

Banjō (磐城, Cliff Castle) was a steam gunboat, serving in the early Imperial Japanese Navy. The ship was named after a mountain in Shizuoka prefecture.

== Background ==
Banjō was a three-masted wooden-hulled gunboat with a double-expansion reciprocating steam engine with four rectangular boilers driving one screw. Her design was based on the basic outlines of the foreign-designed Amagi, but Banjō built in Japan at the Yokosuka Naval Arsenal and was the fourth vessel to be completed at that shipyard. Her first captain was Lieutenant Commander Tsuboi Kōzō.

== Operational history ==
Banjō saw combat service in the First Sino-Japanese War of 1894–1895, patrolling between Korea, Dairen and Weihaiwei in a reserve capacity in the IJN 2nd Fleet.

On 21 March 1898, Banjō was re-designated as a second-class gunboat, and was used for coastal survey and patrol duties as well as a fisheries protection vessel.

During the Russo-Japanese War, Banjō assisted in maintaining the Japanese blockade during the Siege of Port Arthur. She was also present as the Battle of Tsushima in a reserve role.

Banjō was removed from the active list on 12 July 1907 and was struck from the navy list on 25 May 1911. She was demilitarized and sold on 23 April 1912 to the Niigata Prefectural Commercial High School in Niigata for use as a training vessel. Her eventual fate is unknown.
