= Tsuboi Kōzō =

Japanese admiral

Baron Tsuboi Kōzō
- 坪井 航三
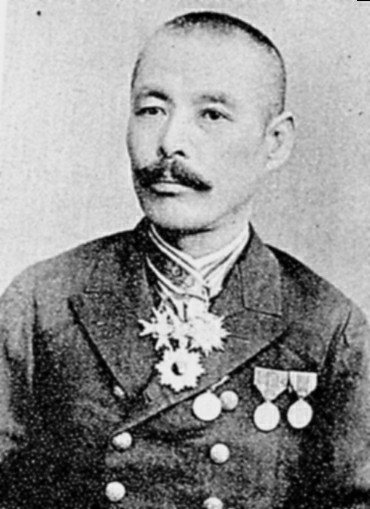
- Born: March 7, 1843; Chōshū domain Japan
- Died: February 1, 1898 (aged 54); Tokyo, Japan
- Military career
- Allegiance: Empire of Japan
- Branch: Imperial Japanese Navy
- Service years: 1871–1898
- Rank: Vice Admiral
- Conflicts: Shimonoseki campaign; Boshin War; First Sino-Japanese War; Battle of Pungdo; Battle of Yalu River (1894)

Baron Tsuboi Kōzō (坪井 航三; 7 March 1843 – 1 February 1898) was an admiral of the early modern Imperial Japanese Navy, known primarily for his role in the First Sino-Japanese War.

== Biography ==
Tsuboi Kōzō was born as Hara Kōzō, the second son of a doctor in what is now part of Hōfu, Yamaguchi, and was adopted into the Tsuboi family as a child. As a Chōshū Domain samurai he took part in the defense of the city during the bombardment of Shimonoseki by European warships from September 5 to 8, 1864. Witnessing firsthand the firepower and devastation caused by a relatively few Western warships, Tsuboi became convinced Japan must also obtain this weaponry to survive. He enlisted in the Chōshū domain navy later that year and served aboard the Kigai-maru, while studying English and navigation at the Chōshū Naval School.

Serving on five Chōshū domain ships between 1866 and 1868, Tsuboi assisted in transporting imperial soldiers on the Inland Sea during the Boshin War against the Tokugawa shogunate, and was later officially commissioned a lieutenant in the newly established Imperial Japanese Navy in 1870, and assigned to the screw sloop Hōshō. He became executive officer of the ironclad warship Kōtetsu in 1871. That same year he received training on board the flagship USS Colorado of the American Asiatic Squadron and was sponsored by Admiral John Rodgers to attend Columbia University from April 1872 until July 1874.

Returning to Japan in 1874, Tsuboi was promoted to lieutenant commander. His first command was as captain of the Dai Ichi Teibō from August 3, 1874. From 1875 through 1879, he surprised warship construction at the Yokosuka Naval Arsenal; however, he was injured in an accident in August 1878 which required two months hospitalization. On his return to active status in February 1879, he served as commander of various ships, including the paddle corvette Jingei, gunboat Banjō, corvette Nisshin and corvette Kaimon, and various shore posts until 1889 (including Deputy Director of the Imperial Japanese Navy Technical Department. He returned to sea as captain the cruiser Takachiho from April 1889 to September 1890, serving simultaneously as chief-of-staff of the Readiness Fleet.

Promoted to rear admiral from September 1890, Tsuboi was commander of the Sasebo Naval District to December 1892, commandant of the Imperial Japanese Naval Academy from 1892 to 1893, and commandant of the Naval Staff College from 1893 to 1894.

In command of the Readiness Fleet during the First Sino-Japanese War, Tsuboi was at the Battle of Pungdo in command of the Yoshino, and later won distinction at the Battle of the Yalu on September 17, 1894, where (as commander of the Flying Squadron), he displayed innovative tactics and aggressive maneuvers against the Chinese Beiyang Fleet.

A national hero following the war, Tsuboi was ennobled with the title of danshaku (baron) under the kazoku peerage system on August 20, 1895, and promoted to vice admiral the following year. In 1896 he was made Commander in Chief of the Readiness Fleet, and in 1897, Commander of the Yokosuka Naval District. He died of cancer in 1898. His grave is at the temple of Zuisho-ji, in Shirogane-dai, Tokyo.
