= Tomoshige Samejima =

Imperial Japanese Navy vice admiral (1889–1966)

Baron Tomoshige Samejima
- 鮫島 具重
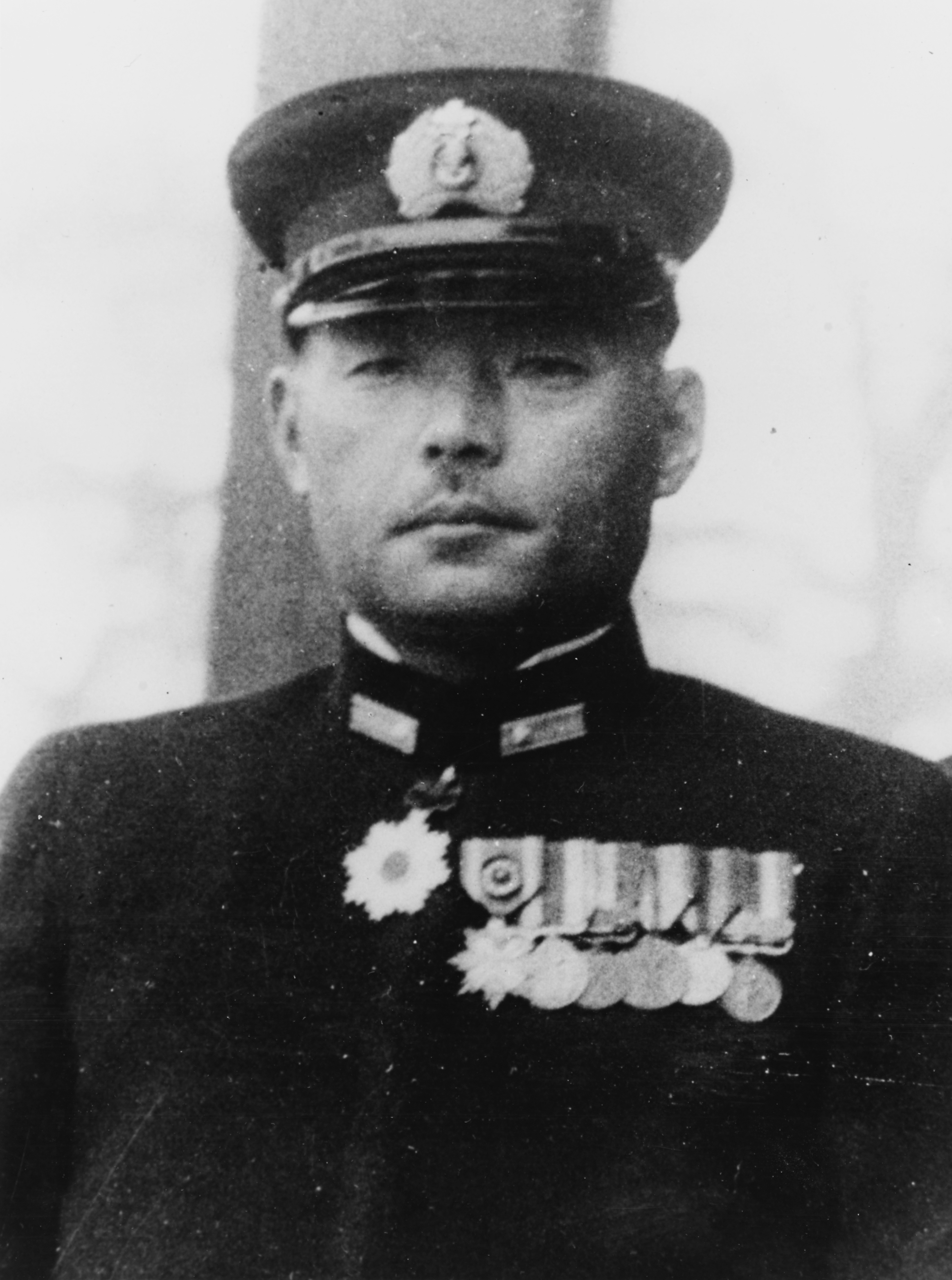
- Born: April 8, 1889; Tokyo, Japan
- Died: September 13, 1966 (aged 77)
- Education: Imperial Japanese Navy Academy; Navy Staff College
- Family: Iwakura Tomomi (grandfather); Samejima Kazunori (adoptive father)
- Military career
- Allegiance: Empire of Japan
- Branch: Imperial Japanese Navy
- Service years: 1909–1946
- Rank: Vice admiral
- Units: Soya, Sagami, Katori, Aso, Hashidate, Kashima, Kawachi, Kaba, Azuma, Kongō, Mutsu, Yura, Haguro, 1st Expeditionary Fleet
- Commands: Seito, Kitakami, Mogami, Haguro, Nagato, 4th Carrier Division, 13th Squadron, 2nd Carrier Division, 4th Fleet, 8th Fleet
- Conflicts: World War II; Pacific War; New Guinea campaign; Solomon Islands campaign
- Other work: Aide-de-camp

Baron Tomoshige Samejima (鮫島 具重, Samejima Tomoshige; April 8, 1889 – September 13, 1966) was a vice admiral in the Imperial Japanese Navy during World War II.

== Biography ==
Samejima was the grandson of Iwakura Tomomi, and adopted by Admiral Samejima Kazunori, a native of Satsuma Domain and noted figure in the Meiji restoration. Samejima graduated from the 37th class of the Imperial Japanese Navy Academy, ranking 51st out of 179 cadets in 1909. He served his midshipman duty on the cruiser Soya and battleships Sagami and Katori and as a sub-lieutenant on the cruisers Aso, and Hashidate. After graduating from naval artillery and torpedo classes, he was assigned to the battleships Kashima and Kawachi followed by the destroyer Kaba. He was promoted to lieutenant in 1915. He subsequently served on the cruiser Azuma and battleship Kongō, and after a two-year tour as an instructor at the Naval Gunnery School from 1918–1920, he was reassigned to the battleship Mutsu. In 1921, he served as aide-de-camp to Prince Higashifushimi Yorihito and was promoted to lieutenant commander.

From 1921-1923, he attended the Navy Staff College, and on graduation, served two years on the light cruiser Yura. From 1925-1927, he traveled to England, where he studied at his own expense. On his return to Japan, he was promoted to commander and assigned as aide-de-camp to Prince Takamatsu Nobuhito.

Samejima returned to sea as executive officer of the Haguro from November 1929 to November 1930. His first command was in 1931 as captain of the transport Seito.

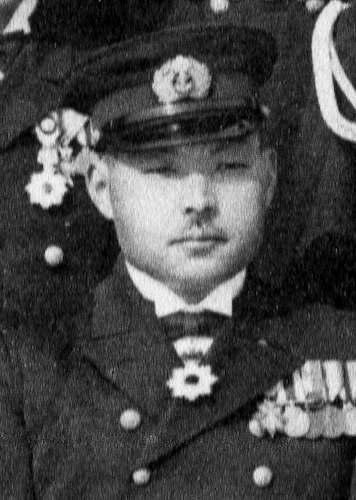
Samejima in 1937

In 1931, with the First Shanghai Incident, Samejima served on the staff of the Japanese 1st Expeditionary Fleet and was promoted to captain. He was given command of the cruisers Kitakami from 1932 to 1934, Mogami from 1934 to 1935, Haguro from 1935–1936 and the battleship Nagato from 1936 to 1937.

As rear admiral from December 1937, Samejima commanded 4th Carrier Division from 1937–1938, Cruiser Division 13 from August–September 1938, and 2nd Carrier Division from September 1938 to October 1939.

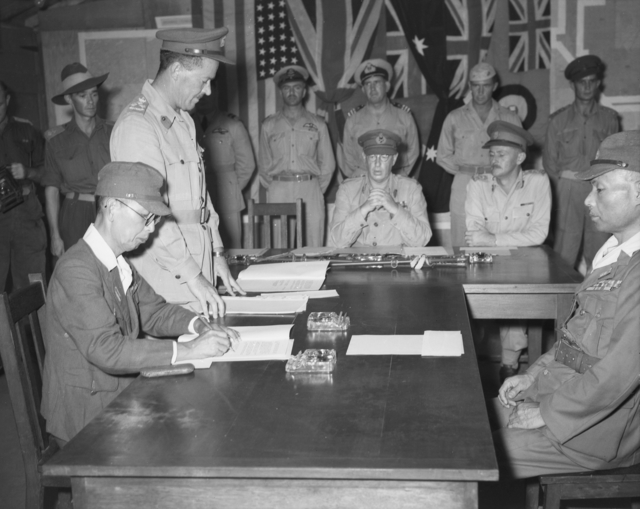
Samejima (seated right) during the Japanese surrender of the Solomon Islands on September 8, 1945.

From November 1939 to October 1942, Samejima served as aide-de-camp to the Emperor of Japan, and was in this position at the time of the attack on Pearl Harbor. He was promoted to vice admiral in October 1941. From October 1942, Samejima returned to sea as commander of the IJN 4th Fleet, which was responsible for defending the South Seas Mandate against counter-attacks by the Allied forces. From April 1943 to the surrender of Japan, Samejima served as commander of the IJN 8th Fleet.

He retired from active service in 1946 and died in 1966.

Military offices
| Preceded by Inoue Shigeyoshi | Commander-in-chief of the 4th Fleet; 26 October 1942 - 1 April 1943 | Succeeded by Kobayashi Masami |
| Preceded by Mikawa Gunichi | Commander-in-chief of the 8th Fleet; 1 April 1943 – 3 September 1945 | Succeeded by Fleet Dissolved |
