= Japanese ironclad Ryūjō =

British built Japanese ironclad

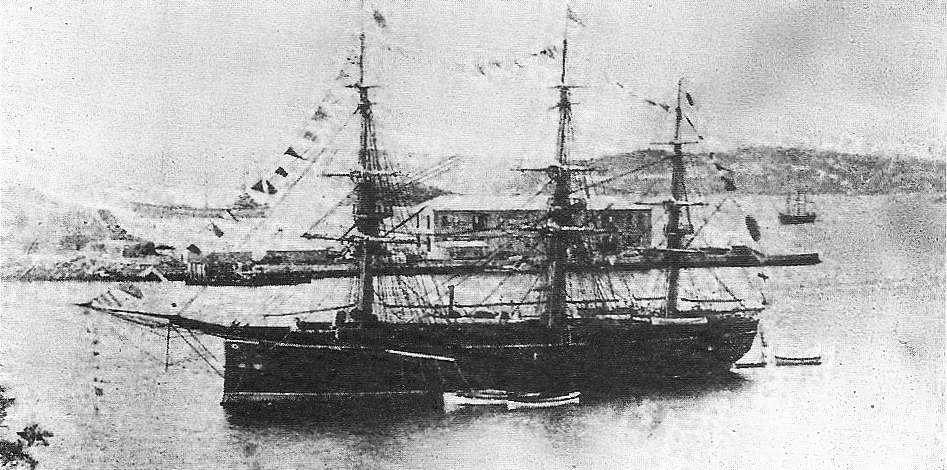
- Ryūjō at anchor c. 1871–1872

History

Empire of Japan
- Name: Ryūjō
- Builder: Alexander Hall, Aberdeen
- Launched: 27 March 1869
- Completed: 26 July 1869
- Commissioned: 6 June 1870
- Decommissioned: 2 December 1893
- Out of service: September 1906
- Renamed: Known by the builder as Jho Sho Maru; Ryusho on 12 April 1870; Ryūjō unknown date
- Fate: Sold for scrap, 1908

General characteristics (as built)
- Type: Ironclad corvette
- Displacement: 2,530 long tons (2,571 t)
- Length: 210 ft (64 m) (p/p)
- Beam: 38 ft (11.6 m)
- Draught: 18 ft 6 in (5.6 m)
- Installed power: 4 rectangular boilers; 800 ihp (600 kW)
- Propulsion: 1 shaft; 2 direct-acting steam engines
- Sail plan: Ship rigged
- Speed: 9 knots (17 km/h; 10 mph)
- Complement: 275 (October 1873)
- Armament: 2 × 100-pdr smoothbore muzzle-loading guns; 8 × 64-pdr smoothbore muzzle-loading guns
- Armour: Waterline belt: 4.5 in (114 mm)

Ryūjō (龍驤, Prancing Dragon), was a British-built ironclad corvette of the Imperial Japanese Navy (IJN). She was purchased on behalf of a Japanese daimyo or clan lord in 1870 who donated the ship to the fledgling IJN shortly after receiving the ship. As the largest ship in the IJN Ryūjō was frequently visited by the Emperor Meiji and was used to escort a diplomatic mission to Imperial China. She played minor roles in suppressing several of the rebellions that plagued Japan in the 1870s.

The ship ran aground in 1877 and was not refloated for almost six months. Ryūjō became a training ship after repairs were completed in 1880 and made several long training cruises throughout the Pacific Basin during the 1880s. Her second cruise in 1882–1883 was interrupted when nearly half the crew developed beriberi. A Japanese naval physician, Takaki Kanehiro, had developed a theory that the disease was caused by a dietary deficiency and was able to persuade the government to repeat the voyage with a different ship using a more nutritious diet. The only cases of beriberi that developed on that cruise were by sailors who did not eat the new diet, confirming the theory.

Ryūjō was converted into a stationary training ship when her propulsion machinery was removed in 1887–1888 and was assigned to the naval gunnery school in 1890. She remained in that role through 1906 even after the ship was decommissioned in 1893. Ryūjō was sold for scrap in 1908.

== Background and description ==
A wooden-hulled ironclad corvette was ordered by a British merchant for the private navy of the fief of Kumamoto. (Note: The speculation by naval historian A. J. Watts that the ship was built with the possible idea of selling her to the Confederate States Navy can be rejected as he quoted an 1864 launch date that is contradicted by the builder's records of an 1869 date.) Known by the builder as Jho Sho Maru, she was 210 feet (64 m) long between perpendiculars with a beam of 38 feet (11.6 m) and a draught of 18 feet 6 inches (5.6 m) at deep load. (Note: Published data for the ship's specifications vary considerably, but the shipbuilder's records can be assumed to be the most accurate and have been used here.) Using the Moorsom System in use at the time of her construction for estimating cargo space, the ship had a gross register tonnage of 992 tons if the propulsion machinery spaces is excluded. The corvette displaced 2,530 long tons (2,570 t) and was fitted with a naval ram at her bow. Her crew numbered 275 in October 1873.

Ryūjō was fitted with a pair of horizontal direct-acting steam engines (Note: Lengerer states that this was actually a single two-cylinder engine.) that drove a single propeller shaft using steam that was provided by four rectangular boilers at a working pressure of 1.4 atm (142 kPa; 21 psi). The engines were rated at a total of 280 nominal horsepower (800 indicated horsepower (600 kW)) and gave the ship a speed of 9 knots (17 km/h; 10 mph). She carried a maximum of 450 long tons (460 t) of coal, but her endurance is unknown. The corvette was ship rigged with three masts.

Ryūjō was initially armed with a pair of 100-pounder (6.5-inch (165 mm)) guns on pivot mounts as chase guns and her broadside armament consisted of eight 64-pounder 5.5-inch (140 mm) guns, all of which were smoothbore muzzle-loading guns made by Josiah Vavasseur's London Ordnance Works. After her delivery to the Japanese in 1870, her armament was augmented with a pair of 6-pounder (2.2-inch (57 mm)) Armstrong guns and two Parrott rifled muzzle-loading guns of unknown size. By 1872 the Parrott rifles had been replaced by another pair of 64 pounders By 1887 her armament reportedly consisted of two 17 cm RK L/25 Krupp rifled breech-loading guns (actually 17.26-centimetre (6.8 in)) and six 70-pounder Vavasseur guns. When the ship was converted into a gunnery training ship in 1894, she was armed with one Krupp 17 cm gun and five 6.3-inch (160 mm) rifled muzzle-loaders.

The ship's waterline was protected by an armoured belt that weighed 130 long tons (132 t). It consisted of two rows of wrought-iron plates with a total height of 5 feet (1.5 m) and was 4.5 inches (114 mm) thick. The guns may have been covered by 4 inches (102 mm) of armour. (Note: Lengerer believes that the belt was only 4 inches thick, did not cover the bow or the stern, and that the guns were unprotected.)

== Construction and career ==
Thomas Blake Glover, a British merchant with extensive commercial interests in Japan, ordered an armoured corvette from the Aberdeen, Scotland, shipyard of Alexander Hall for the price of £42,032. The ship was launched on 27 March 1869 and was completed on 24 July. She departed for Japan on 11 August and arrived at Nagasaki in January 1870 where Glover sold it to the Kumamoto Domain for the price of 270,000 gold Ryō on 12 April. They renamed it Ryōshō (龍驤, りょうしょう) (she was later renamed Ryūjō (龍驤, りゅうじょう) at an unknown date).

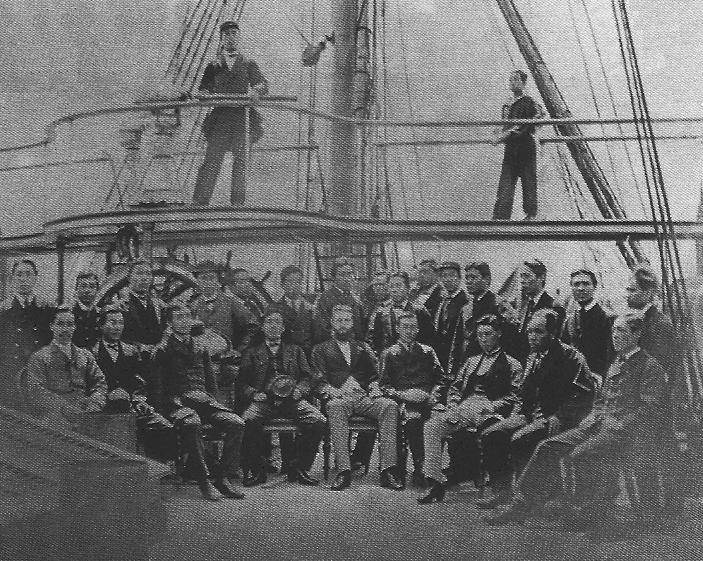
Naval gunnery trainees on the Ryūjō gathered around their English instructor, Lieutenant Horse (ホース中尉), in early 1871

The corvette was transferred to the new Imperial Japanese Navy on 6 June and was the flagship (and the most powerful ship) of the navy until the completion of the ironclad Fusō in 1878. Ryūjō sailed to Yokohama with a British captain shortly afterwards. Ryūjō was inspected by Emperor Meiji during a visit to Yokosuka Naval Arsenal on 21 November 1871 and he was hosted aboard the ship during a tour on 23 May 1872. The Emperor reviewed the fleet during its manoeuvres on 26 October. The ship participated in exercises off the island of Sarushima in Tokyo Bay on 19 January 1873 and escorted Foreign Minister Soejima Taneomi on his mission to Imperial China later in the year to demand recompense for the murders of Japanese sailors by Taiwanese aborigines in 1871. During the Saga Rebellion, the ship played a small role by ferrying the government's commander-in-chief and his staff to nearby Nagasaki in March 1874. Later that year she hosted the Home Minister Ōkubo Toshimichi.

On 5 March 1875 the Emperor visited Ryūjō while in Yokosuka Naval Arsenal to attend the launching of the unprotected corvette Seiki. From 13 April 1876 to 27 July, the ship visited Vladivostok, Russia, and various ports in Korea. She was in Kobe when the Satsuma Rebellion began in February 1877 and Ryūjō played a minor role in putting down the rebellion. The ship ran aground on a rock in Kagoshima Bay during a storm on 26 October and was not refloated until 15 May 1878. Towed by the sloop-of-war Nisshin to Yokosuka on 24–29 July, repairs were not completed until 1880. On 30 October she became a training ship of the Imperial Naval Academy.

Her first training cruise was a voyage to Australia in 1881 and she was transferred to the Tōkai Naval Station in Yokohama on 7 April 1882. The ship made a second long-distance navigational training voyage from 19 December to 15 October 1883 that visited Wellington, New Zealand, Valparaíso, Chile, Callao, Peru, and Honolulu, Kingdom of Hawai'i. The ship had to stop in Honolulu because 169 crewmen (of a crew of 376) had developed beriberi and were unfit to continue, of which 23 died. Takaki Kanehiro, a naval physician, had been investigating the possible causes of beriberi over the previous several years and had developed a theory that it was the result of some sort of dietary deficiency, possibly protein. Trained in epidemiological methods during his medical training in London, Takaki was able to persuade the navy to experiment with a new, higher-protein diet and send the training ship Tsukuba following an identical itinerary to minimise the variables. That ship departed Japan on 3 February 1884 and return on 16 November, with her crew only developing 14 cases of beriberi among the 333 crewmen. Further investigation revealed that the crew members who had not followed the new diet were the only ones who developed beriberi. The IJN adopted the new diet across the board and eliminated the disease in a few years.

Ryūjō steamed from Shinagawa on 26 December 1884 for a cruise off the coast of Korea. From 1 February 1887 to 11 September, she made a third long-distance navigational training voyage to Australia and Hawaii. When the ship returned, her machinery was removed over the next year. On 23 December 1890 she was rerated as a 3rd type ship and became a training ship at the gunnery school; Ryūjō was further reduced to a 5th type ship (decommissioned) on 2 December 1893, and was no longer permanently manned. During the First Sino-Japanese War, she was used a floating battery at the entrance to Yokosuka Harbour with a crew of 137 men from 12 September 1894 to 17 February 1895 when she reverted to her earlier role. She continued to be used as a gunnery training ship until a new shore-based facility was completed in September 1906. On 31 July 1908 the government ordered that her bow ornamentation and name board should be sent to Kumamoto Castle for preservation before Ryūjō was sold for scrap later that year. (Note: Lengerer states that the ship was reclassified as a "vessel for various purposes" (hulked) on 1 April 1896 and was used for minor functions until she was sold for scrap in 1908.)
