= Japanese corvette Amagi =

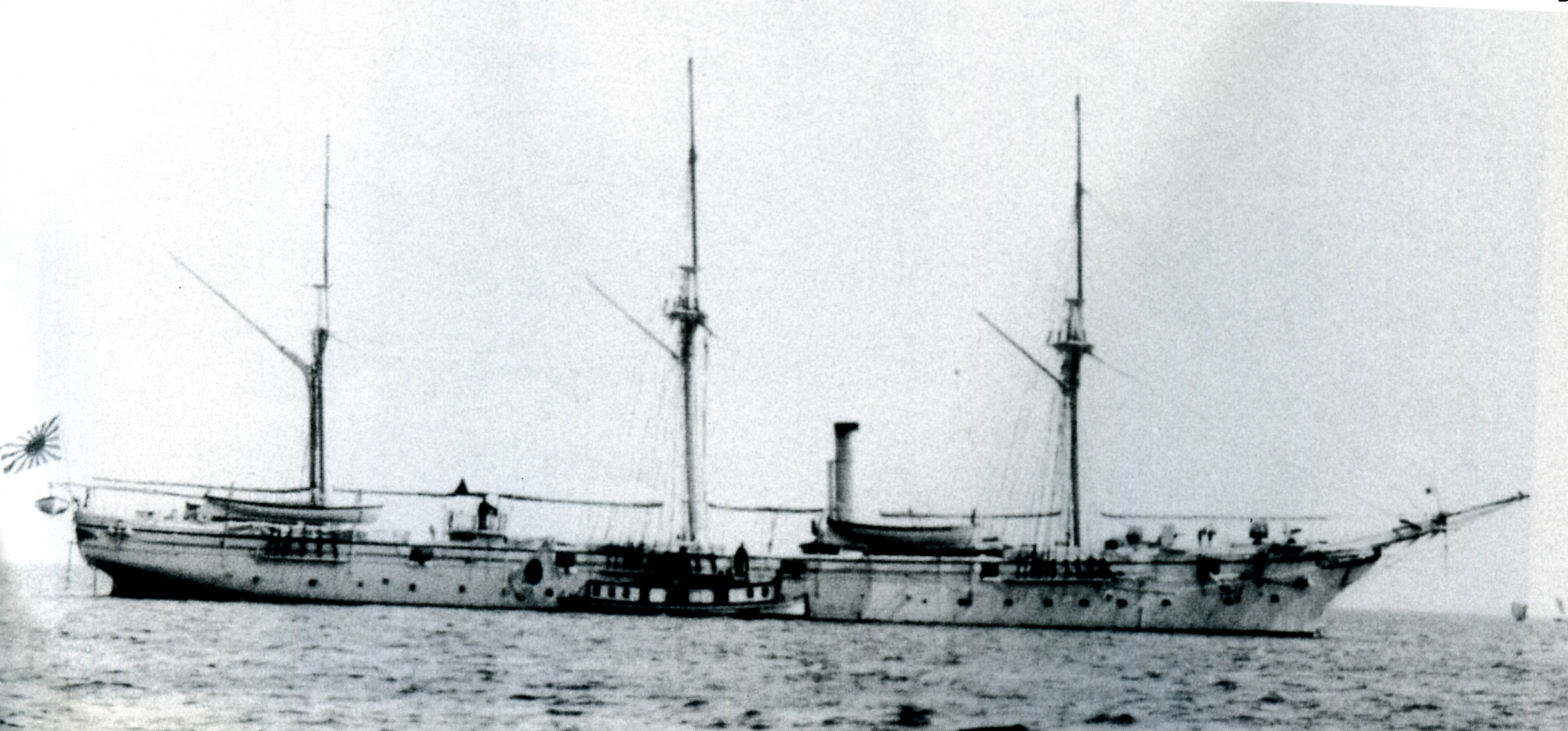
- Amagi in 1897

History

Empire of Japan
- Name: Amagi
- Ordered: 1875 Fiscal Year
- Builder: Yokosuka Naval Arsenal, Japan
- Laid down: 9 September 1875
- Launched: 13 March 1877
- Commissioned: 4 April 1878
- Stricken: 14 June 1905
- Fate: Sold 24 November 1908

General characteristics
- Type: Sloop
- Displacement: 926 long tons (941 t)
- Length: 62.17 m (204 ft 0 in)
- Beam: 10.89 m (35 ft 9 in)
- Draft: 4.63 m (15 ft 2 in)
- Propulsion: horizontally-mounted reciprocating steam engine 720 hp (540 kW); 2 boilers, 1 shaft
- Sail plan: bark-rigged sloop
- Speed: 11.5 knots (13.2 mph; 21.3 km/h)
- Range: 150 tons coal
- Complement: 159
- Armament: 1 × 6.7 in (170 mm) Krupp breech-loading gun; 4 × 4.7 in (120 mm) breech-loading guns; 3 × 3.1 in (79 mm) breech-loading guns; 1 × 3 in (76 mm) triple Nordenfelt gun

Amagi (天城, Heavenly Castle) was a screw sloop in the early Imperial Japanese Navy, and was the third vessel built by the Yokosuka Naval Arsenal after its acquisition by the Meiji government. When built, Amagi was the largest warship yet produced domestically in Japan. Amagi was named after the Mount Amagi, in Shizuoka Prefecture, Japan.

== Background ==
Amagi was designed as a wooden-hulled three-masted bark-rigged sloop with a coal-fired triple expansion reciprocating steam engine driving a single screw. Made mostly of pine wood, the wooden beams and metal fittings came from the mountains of central Izu Peninsula, which also provided the ship with its name. She was laid down at Yokosuka Naval Arsenal on 9 September 1875 under the direction of Léonce Verny, a French naval engineer initially hired by the Tokugawa shogunate, who stayed on as a foreign advisor to the early Meiji government as chief administrator and constructor of the Yokosuka Naval Arsenal. She was launched on 13 March 1877 and commissioned into the Imperial Japanese Navy on 4 April 1878. Her design was a scaled-up version of the corvette Seiki, also built at the same shipyards.

== Operational history ==
With heightened tensions with Joseon dynasty Korea after the assassination of several members of the Japanese embassy in the Imo Incident, Amagi was assigned to patrols off the Korean coast as a show of force in the summer of 1882, with Lieutenant Tōgō Heihachirō as executive officer.

Tōgō later was captain of Amagi in 1884, when it became the first Japanese warship to ascend the Yangzi River in China, making a port call at the treaty port at Wuhan. He also observed French naval operations off Taiwan during the Sino-French War of 1884-1885.

Amagi saw combat service in the First Sino-Japanese War of 1894-1895 under the command of Lieutenant Commander Nashiba Tokioki, at the Battle of Lushunkou, Battle of Weihaiwei and the Battle of Yalu River. After the war, Amagi was re-designated as a second-class gunboat, and was used for coastal patrol duties. At that time, she underwent refit in Kobe. During the Russo-Japanese War, Amagi was assigned to be a guard ship at Yokohama port, however, before the end of the war she was declared obsolete and was struck from the navy list on 14 June 1905.

On 24 November 1908, the demilitarized hulk was sold to the Toba Shosen Gakkō, the predecessor of the Toba National College of Maritime Technology, where she was used as a training vessel. Her eventual fate is unknown.
