= Japanese ironclad Fusō =

Imperial Japanese Navy's ironclad

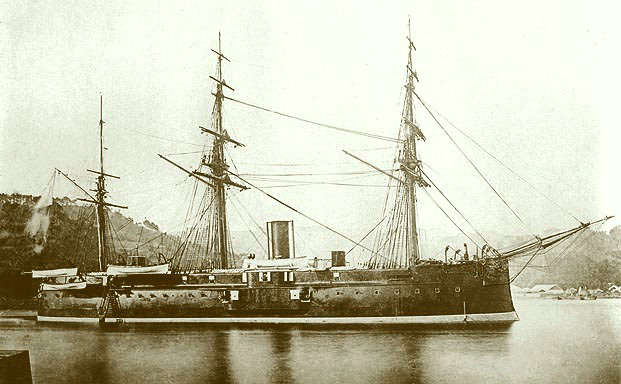
- Fusō as completed

History

Japan
- Name: Fusō (Japanese: 扶桑)
- Namesake: Classical name for Japan
- Ordered: 24 September 1875
- Builder: Samuda Brothers
- Laid down: 24 September 1875?
- Launched: 17 April 1877
- Completed: January 1878
- Reclassified: Coast defense ship, December 1905
- Stricken: 1 April 1908
- Fate: Sold for scrap, 1909

General characteristics (as built)
- Type: Central-battery ironclad
- Displacement: 3,717 long tons (3,777 t)
- Length: 220 ft (67.1 m)
- Beam: 48 ft (14.6 m)
- Draft: 18 ft 5 in (5.6 m)
- Installed power: 3,500 ihp (2,600 kW); 8 cylindrical boilers
- Propulsion: 2 shafts, 2 trunk steam engines
- Sail plan: Barque rigged
- Speed: 13 knots (24 km/h; 15 mph)
- Range: 4,500 nmi (8,300 km; 5,200 mi) at 10 knots (19 km/h; 12 mph)
- Complement: 295
- Armament: 4 × 24 cm RK L/22 (9.3 in) Krupp guns; 2 × 17 cm RK L/25 (6.8 in) Krupp guns; 4 × long 75 mm (3.0 in) guns; 2 × short 75 mm (3.0 in) guns
- Armor: Belt: 6.4–9 in (163–229 mm); Battery: 9 in (229 mm); Bulkheads: 8 in (203 mm)

Fusō (扶桑) was a central-battery ironclad built for the Imperial Japanese Navy (IJN) in the 1870s. She was built in the United Kingdom because such ships could not yet be constructed in Japan. The ship participated in the First Sino-Japanese War of 1894–95 where she was damaged during the Battle of the Yalu River in 1894 and participated in the Battle of Weihaiwei in early 1895. She collided with two Japanese ships during a storm and sank in 1897. She was refloated the following year and repaired. Fusō played a minor role in the Russo-Japanese War of 1904–1905 and was reclassified as a coast defense ship after the war. She was struck from the Navy List in 1908 and sold for scrap the following year.

== Background ==
Tensions between Japan and China heightened after the former launched its punitive expedition against Taiwan in May 1874 in retaliation of the murder of 54 Ryukyuan shipwrecked sailors by the Paiwan aborigines near the southwestern tip of Taiwan in December 1871. China inquired into the possibility of buying ironclad warships from Great Britain and Japan was already negotiating with the Brazilian government about the purchase of the ironclad Independencia then under construction in Britain. The Japanese terminated the negotiations with the Brazilians in October after the ship was badly damaged upon launching and the expeditionary force was about to withdraw from Taiwan. The crisis illustrated the need to reinforce the IJN and a budget request was submitted that same month by Acting Navy Minister Kawamura Sumiyoshi for ¥3.9–4.2 million to purchase three warships from abroad. This was rejected as too expensive and a revised request of ¥2.3 million was approved later that month. No Japanese shipyard was able to build ships of this size so they were ordered from Great Britain. Nothing was done until March 1875 when Kawamura proposed to buy one ironclad for half of the money authorized and use the rest for shipbuilding and gun production at the Yokosuka Shipyard. No response was made by the Prime Minister's office before the proposal was revised to use all of the allocated money to buy three ships, one iron-hulled armored warship and two armored corvettes of composite construction to be designed by the prominent British naval architect Sir Edward Reed, formerly the Chief Constructor of the Royal Navy. Reed would also supervise the construction of the ships for an honorarium of five percent of the construction cost. The Prime Minister's office approved the revised proposal on 2 May and notified the Japanese consul, Ueno Kagenori, that navy officers would be visiting to negotiate the contract with Reed.

Commander Matsumura Junzō arrived in London on 21 July and gave Reed the specifications for the ships. Reed responded on 3 September with a proposal that exceeded the amount allocated in the budget. Ueno signed the contracts for all three ships on 24 September despite this issue because Reed was scheduled to depart for a trip to Russia and the matter had to be concluded before his departure. Ueno had informed the Navy Ministry about the costs before signing, but Kawamura's response to postpone the order for the armored frigate did not arrive until 8 October. The totals for all three contracts came to £433,850 or ¥2,231,563 and did not include the armament. These were ordered from Krupp with a 50 percent down payment of £24,978. The government struggled to provide the necessary money even though the additional expenses had been approved by the Prime Minister's office on 5 June 1876, especially as more money was necessary to fully equip the ships for sea and to provision them for the delivery voyage to Japan.

== Description ==
The design of Fusō was based on a scaled-down version of HMS Iron Duke, an Audacious-class central-battery ironclad, familiar to the Japanese as the flagship of the Royal Navy China Station from 1871 to 1875. The ship was 220 feet (67.1 m) long between perpendiculars and had a beam of 48 feet (14.6 m). She had a forward draft of 17 feet 9 inches (5.4 m) and drew 18 feet 5 inches (5.6 m) aft. She displaced 2,248 long tons (2,284 t) and had a crew of 26 officers and 269 enlisted men.

=== Propulsion ===
Fusō had a pair of two-cylinder, double-expansion trunk steam engines made by John Penn and Sons, each driving a two-bladed 15-foot-6-inch (4.7 m) propeller. Eight cylindrical boilers provided steam to the engine at a working pressure of 4.09 bar (409 kPa; 59 psi). The engines were designed to produce 3,500 indicated horsepower (2,600 kW) to give the ships a speed of 13 knots (24 km/h; 15 mph). During her sea trials on 3 January 1878, she reached a maximum speed of 13.16 knots (24.37 km/h; 15.14 mph) from 3,824 ihp (2,852 kW). The ship carried a maximum of 350 long tons (360 t) of coal, enough to steam 4,500 nautical miles (8,300 km; 5,200 mi) at 10 knots (19 km/h; 12 mph). The three-masted ironclad was barque-rigged and had a sail area of 17,000 square feet (1,579 m^{2}). To reduce wind resistance while under sail alone, the funnel was semi-retractable.

The ship was modernized at Yokosuka Naval Arsenal beginning in 1891. Her masts were removed and the fore- and mizzenmasts were replaced by two military masts also fitted with fighting tops. Her funnel was fixed in height and she received four new cylindrical boilers. To offset the reduced number of boilers, the new ones were fitted with forced draught which increased their working pressure to 6.13 bar (613 kPa; 89 psi). The space made available by removal of the boilers was used to increase her coal storage by 36 long tons (37 t).

=== Armament and armor ===
Fusō was fitted with four Krupp 24 cm RK L/22 rifled breech-loading (RBL) guns with had an actual caliber of 235.4-millimeter (9.3 in). These were 22 calibers (L/22) long and weighed 15.5-metric-ton (15.3 LT). There were also two Krupp 17 cm RK L/25 RBLs. These had an actual caliber of 172.6-millimeter (6.8 in), were 25 calibers (L/25) long and weighed 5.6-metric-ton (5.5 LT). The 24 cm guns were mounted at the corners of the armored citadel on the main deck at an angle of 65 degrees to the centerline of the ship. Each gun could traverse 35 degrees to the left and right. Only the 60-degree arc at the bow and stern could not be fired upon. The two pivot-mounted 17-centimeter guns were positioned on the sides of the upper deck, each with three gun ports that allowed them to act as chase guns, firing fore and aft, as well as on the broadside. The ship also carried four long and two short 75-millimeter (3.0 in) guns, the latter intended for use ashore or mounted on the ship's boats.

The armor-piercing shell of the 24-centimeter gun weighed 352.7 pounds (160 kg). It had a muzzle velocity of 1,560 ft/s (475 m/s) and was credited with the ability to penetrate 15.5 inches (393 mm) of wrought iron armor at the muzzle. The 132.3-pound (60 kg) 17-centimeter shell had a muzzle velocity of 1,510–1,600 ft/s (460–487 m/s) and could penetrate 10.3–11.4 inches (262–290 mm) of armor. The only data available for the 75-millimeter guns is their muzzle velocities of 1,550 ft/s (473 m/s) and 960 ft/s (292 m/s) for the long and short-barreled guns respectively.

During the 1880s the armament of Fusō was augmented several times. In June 1883 seven quadruple-barreled 25.4-millimeter (1.0 in) Nordenfelt machine guns were added for defense against torpedo boats. Five were positioned on the upper deck and one each in the fighting tops. Three years later two quintuple-barreled 11-millimeter (0.4 in) Nordenfeldt machine guns were mounted in the fighting tops. Slightly earlier, Fusō became the first ship in the IJN to mount 356-millimeter (14.0 in) torpedo tubes for Schwartzkopff torpedoes when two above-water, traversable tubes, one on each broadside, were added in late 1885. She first fired these weapons on 14 January 1886 although further testing revealed that the torpedoes were often damaged by the impact with the water. Upon the recommendation of the prominent French naval architect Louis-Émile Bertin, a "spoon" was added to the ends of the tubes to make the torpedoes strike the water horizontally which better distributed the shock of impact. The modifications were made and successful tests were conducted before the end of the year.

When the ship was being refitted from 1891 to 1894, her anti-torpedo boat armament was reinforced by the replacement of three 25.4-millimeter Nordenfelt guns by a pair of 2.5-pounder Hotchkiss guns and a single 3-pounder Hotchkiss gun. Two additional 11-millimeter Nordenfelt guns in the fighting tops were also added at that time. After the Sino-Japanese War, a small poop deck was added in 1896 and a quick-firing (QF) 12-centimetre (4.7 in) gun was mounted there as the stern chase gun. Another such gun was mounted on the forecastle as the forward chase gun and the two 17-centimeter guns were replaced by another pair of 12-centimeter quick-firers. In addition twelve 3-pounder Hotchkiss guns were added and the 11-millimeter guns were replaced by 25.4-millimeter Nordenfelts. In March 1900 the 12-centimeter chase guns were superseded by two QF 15-centimetre (5.9 in) guns and the former chase guns were shifted to make room for them. The final change to Fusō's armament was made in July 1906 when her obsolete 24-centimeter guns were replaced by two QF 15-centimeter guns and two more 3-pounders were added.

Fusō had a wrought-iron waterline armor belt 9 inches (229 mm) thick amidships that tapered to 6.4 inches (162 mm) at the ends of the ship. The sides of the central battery were 9 inches thick and the transverse bulkheads were 8 inches (203 mm) thick. (Note: A number of sources say that the armor of the ship's battery was 8 inches thick and that of the transverse bulkheads was 7 inches (178 mm) thick and even Lengerer himself quotes both sets of figures in different places.)

== Construction and career ==
Given a classical name for Japan, Fusō was built at the Samuda Brothers shipyard in Cubitt Town, London. Japanese sources universally give the date for Fusō's keel-laying as 24 September 1875—the same as that for the awarding of the contract—but historian Hans Langerer describes this as improbable, arguing that no shipyard would order enough material to begin construction without cash in hand. Fusō was launched on 14 April 1877 when Ueno Ikuko, wife of the Japanese consul, cut the retaining rope with a hammer and chisel. Completed in January 1878, the ship sailed for Japan before 22 March under the command of a British captain and with a British crew because the IJN was not yet ready for such a long voyage. While transiting the Suez Canal, she was lightly damaged when she ran aground. She received temporary repairs at a local dockyard and arrived in Yokohama on 11 June. She was classified as a second-class warship while still in transit. She was transferred to Yokosuka Naval Arsenal on 17 June for permanent repairs. On 10 July a formal ceremony was held in Yokohama for the receipt of the ship that was attended by the Meiji Emperor and many senior government officials. The ship was then opened for tours by the nobility, their families and invited guests for three days after the ceremony. Beginning on 14 July, the general public was allowed to tour the ship for a week.

Fusō was assigned to the Tokai Naval District and the Standing Fleet in 1880. That same year she transported the Naval Lord, Enomoto Takeaki, on a tour of Hokkaido. On 10 August 1881 she departed with Emperor Meiji on a tour of Aomori Prefecture and Otaru, Hokkaido that lasted until 30 September. The ship was transferred to the Medium Fleet in 1882 and made port visits in Kyushu and Pusan, Korea the following year. Fusō visited Hong Kong and Shanghai, China in 1884. She hosted Empress Shōken for the launching ceremony of the corvette Musashi on 30 March 1886 and was transferred to the Small Standing Fleet in 1887. The ship made a lengthy cruise in the Western Pacific in 1888 and visited ports in Korea, Russia and China the following year. Fusō participated in the fleet maneuvers on 25 March 1880 and then hosted Emperor Meiji for his visits to Kure, Sasebo, and Etajima. From November 1891 to July 1894, Fusō was extensively refitted and partially modernized at Yokosuka Naval Arsenal.

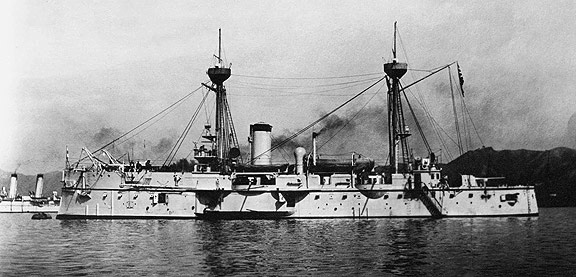
Fusō at anchor after her reconstruction

During the Battle of the Yalu River on 17 September 1894, Fusō was assigned to the rear of the Japanese main body and was heavily engaged by the Chinese ships. Although hit many times by 6-inch (152 mm) shells, not one penetrated her armor; of her crew only five were killed and nine wounded. During the battle her crew fired twenty-nine 24 cm, thirty-two 17 cm, one hundred thirty-six 75 mm, one hundred sixty-four 2.5- and 3-pounder shells and over fifteen hundred shells from her machine guns. The ship was present during the Battle of Weihaiwei in January–February 1895, although she did not see any significant combat. On 29 October 1897, Fusō's anchor chain broke during a strong gale off Nagahama, Ehime and she collided with the ram of the protected cruiser Matsushima at 16:30. She then struck Matsushima's sister ship, Itsukushima, and sank at 16:57. Re-classed as a second-class battleship on 21 March 1898 and refloated on 7 July, Fusō was repaired at Kure Naval Arsenal and ran her trials on 8 April 1900.

Fusō served as the flagship of Rear Admiral Sukeuji Hosoya, Seventh Division, Third Squadron, during the Russo-Japanese War and was held in reserve south of Tsushima Island during the Battle of Tsushima in case the battle drifted her way. On 7 September 1904, her 15-centimeter guns were dismounted for use in the siege of Port Arthur. They were replaced by guns transferred from the damaged Akashi at Maizuru Naval Arsenal on 28 December. She was reclassified as a coast defense ship in December 1905, and stricken on 1 April 1908. Relegated to the status of a "miscellaneous service craft", she was assigned to the Yokosuka Harbor Master until she was ordered to be sold on 15 February 1909. Yokosuka reported her sale on 30 November, but provided no information on the date of sale or the name of the winning bidder.
