= List of ship launches in 1877 =

The list of ship launches in 1877 includes a chronological list of some ships launched in 1877.

Date	Ship	Class / type	Builder	Location	Country	Notes
1 January	County of Inverness	Full-rigged ship	Messrs. Barclay, Curle & Co.	Whiteinch	United Kingdom	For Messrs. R. & J. Craig.
4 January	Falcon	Condor-class gunvessel	Messrs. Laird Bros.	Birkenhead	United Kingdom	For Royal Navy.
6 January	Ocean	Fishing smack	Messrs. Raylton, Dixon & Co.	Middlesbrough	United Kingdom	For private owner.
13 January	Sheffield	Steamship	John Elder & Co.	Govan	United Kingdom	For Manchester, Sheffield & Lincolnshire Railway.
15 January	Morglay	Steamship	Messrs. M. Pearse & Co.	Stockton-on-Tees	United Kingdom	For private owner.
16 January	Czarina	Yacht	Messrs. Camper & Nicholson	Gosport	United Kingdom	For Baroness Rothschild.
17 January	Evelyn	Merchantman	Messrs. Hugh Williams & Co.	Portmadoc	United Kingdom	For Hugh Roberts and others.
18 January	Wanganui	Full-rigged ship	Messrs. Alexander Stephen & Sons	Linthouse	United Kingdom	For New Zealand Shipping Company.
20 January	Fitzjames	Steamship	Messrs. Blackwood & Gordon	Port Glasgow	United Kingdom	For Messrs. Burrell & Sons.
20 January	Renown	Smack	Messrs. Capps & Crisp	Lowestoft	United Kingdom	For R. Saunders.
25 January	Crystal	Mersey Flat		Voryd	United Kingdom	For private owner.
27 January	Sheila	Barque	Messrs. Charles Connell & Co.	Scotstoun	United Kingdom	For Messrs. Sandbach, Tinne & Co.
29 January	Forward	Forester-class gunboat	Barrow Iron Shipbuilding Co.	Barrow-in-Furness	United Kingdom	For Royal Navy.
29 January	Foxhound	Forester-class gunboat	Barrow Iron Shipbuilding Co.	Barrow-in-Furness	United Kingdom	For Royal Navy.
29 January	Telesilla	Steamship	Messrs. Edward Withy & Co.	Middleton	United Kingdom	For Messrs Fawcett & Greenwell.
29 January	Yarkand	Full-rigged ship	Barrow Iron Shipbuilding Co.	Barrow-in-Furness	United Kingdom	For Messrs. E. Bates. & Sons.
31 January	County of Inverness	Clipper	Messrs. R. & J. Evans & Co.	Liverpool	United Kingdom	For Messrs. William Thomas & Co.
31 January	Euryalus	Bacchante-class corvette		Chatham Dockyard	United Kingdom	For Royal Navy.
31 January	Loch Ryan	full-rigged ship	Messrs. J. & G. Thomson	Dalmuir	United Kingdom	For Messrs. Aitken, Lilburn & Co.
31 January	Morning Star	Schooner	Messrs. John Jones & Co.	Aberystwyth	United Kingdom	For private owner.
31 January	Samson	Paddle tug	Messrs. Laird Bros	Birkenhead	United Kingdom	For Admiralty.
31 January	Walton	Steamship	Short Bros.	Sunderland	United Kingdom	For R. B. Avery.
January	Gleneagle	Chinaman	Iron Shipbuilding Company (Limited)	Govan	United Kingdom	For private owner.
January	Lindores Abbey	Barque	Messrs. Robert Duncan & Co.	Port Glasgow	United Kingdom	For John Renton.
January	Priscilla	Steamship		Cowes	United Kingdom	For private owner.
January	Rodell Bay	Full-rigged ship	Messrs Dobie & Co.	Govan	United Kingdom	For Messrs. Law & Co.
January	Strathtay	Steamship	Messrs. Gourlay Brothers & Co.	Dundee	United Kingdom	For W. Thomson.
January	Taranaki	Merchantman	Messrs. Robert Duncan & Co.	Port Glasgow	United Kingdom	For Messrs. P. Henderson & Co.
1 February	Beechdale	Merchantman	Messrs. W. H. Potter & Son	Liverpool	United Kingdom	For Edward Broomhall.
1 February	Memdouhiye	Ironclad	Thames Ironworks and Shipbuilding Company	Leamouth	United Kingdom	For Ottoman Navy. Purchased by Royal Navy in February 1878.
10 February	Slieve More	Clipper	Harland & Wolff	Belfast	United Kingdom	For W. P. Sinclair & Co.
12 February	Melrose	Steamship	Messrs. Steele & Co.	Greenock	United Kingdom	For Messrs. Donald Currie & Co.
13 February	Altona	Steamship	William Thompson	Dundee	United Kingdom	For Yorkshire Coal and Steamship Company.
13 February	Lady Kinnaird	Barque	Messrs. Brown & Simpson	Dundee	United Kingdom	For Mr. Weinberg and others.
13 February	Star of the Seas	Merchantman	Messrs. Richardson, Duck & Co.	Stockton-on-Tees	United Kingdom	For Messrs. Walsh Bros.
13 February	No. 6	Steam hopper barge	Messrs. Thomas Wingate & Co.	Whiteinch	United Kingdom	For Cork Harbour Commissioners.
14 February	Melita	Steamship	Messrs. William Gray & Co.	West Hartlepool	United Kingdom	For private owner.
15 February	Discoverer	Steamship	Messrs. Aitken & Mansel	Whiteinch	United Kingdom	For Messrs. Thomas & James Harrison.
15 February	Firm	Forester-class gunboat	Earle's Shipbuilding & Engineering Co.	Hull	United Kingdom	For Royal Navy.
15 February	Jessie Ann	Schooner	Messrs. Geddie	Banff	United Kingdom	For Mr. Wood.
17 February	Margaret Heald	Barque	Messrs. R. & J. Evans & Co.	Liverpool	United Kingdom	For J. B. Foote.
17 February	Mary	Schooner	Messrs. Barclay & Robertson	Ardrossan	United Kingdom	For private owner.
17 February	Star O' Cowrie	Steamship	J. T. Eltringham	South Shields	United Kingdom	For J. P. Rennoldson.
17 February	Tambora	Steamship	Messrs. Caird & Co.	Greenock	United Kingdom	For Nederlandse Indische Stoomvaart Maatschappij.
18 February	Cerlew	Steamship	Messrs. W. H. Potter & Co.	Liverpool	United Kingdom	For Messrs. C. T. Bowring & Co.
24 February	Lora	Steamship	Messrs. William Swan & Son	Maryhill	United Kingdom	For Messrs. J. & J. Macfarlane.
26 February	Tintern Abbey	Steamship	Messrs. Edward Withy & Co.	Middleton	United Kingdom	For Messrs. Pyman, Watson & Co.
27 February	Zeta	Barque	Messrs. David & William Henderson & Co.	Partick	United Kingdom	For Swansea Merchant Shipowners' Company.
28 February	Firth of Tay	Barque	Messrs. Dobie & Co.	Govan	United Kingdom	For Messrs. James Spencer & Co.
28 February	Gipsy Queen	Barquentine	J. E. Scott	Cartsdyke	United Kingdom	For Messrs Lewis Potter & Co.
28 February	Woodlands	Barque		Passage West	United Kingdom	For private owner.
February	Gem	Steamship	Messrs. M'Kellar & Co	Dumbarton	United Kingdom	For William Robertson.
February	Lurline	Barque	Messrs. Alexander Stephen & Sons	Linthouse	United Kingdom	For private owner.
February	Sciriol Wyn	Barque	Messrs. Russell & Co.	Port Glasgow	United Kingdom	For Mr. Pritchard.
February	Yarra Yarra	Full-rigged ship	Messrs. A. M'Millan & Sons	Dumbarton	United Kingdom	For Messrs. William Crackie & Co.
1 March	Ashmore	East Indiaman	Messrs. John Reid & Co.	Port Glasgow	United Kingdom	For D. Simpson and others.
1 March	Ladyland	Schooner	Messrs. Birrell, Stenhouse & Co.	Dumbarton	United Kingdom	For Messrs. Gillies & Reid.
1 March	Oimara	Lugger	Messrs. M'Queen & Mackay	Campbeltown	United Kingdom	For private owner.
1 March	Serapis	Steamship	Messrs. Raylton, Dixon & Co.	Middlesbrough	United Kingdom	For Messrs. Hutchinson & M'Intyre.
2 March	Bonnie Dundee	Steamship	Gourlay Bros. & Co.	Dundee	United Kingdom	For George & Bruce Nicoll.
2 March	Glasgow	Royal yacht	William Denny and Brothers	Dumbarton	United Kingdom	For the Sultan of Zanzibar.
13 March	Amagi	Sloop-of-war	Yokosuka Naval Arsenal	Yokosuka	Japan	For Imperial Japanese Navy.
13 March	Rishanglys	Steamship	Messrs. John Readhead & Co.	South Shields	United Kingdom	For Robert Harrowing.
15 March	Chanda	Steamship	Messrs. William Denny & Bros.	Dumbarton	United Kingdom	For British India Steam Navigation Company.
16 March	City of Rotterdam	Steamship	Messrs. Richardson, Duck & Co.	Stockton-on-Tees	United Kingdom	For Messrs. Palgrave, Murphy & Co.
17 March	Bellona	Barque	Messrs. Charles Connell & Co.	Scotstoun	United Kingdom	For Messrs. Barton & Co.
17 March	Britannia	Steamship	Messrs. Gourlay, Sons, & Co.	Aberdeen	United Kingdom	For Dundee, Perth & London Shipping Co.
17 March	Horden	Steamship	Messrs. W. Gray & Co.	West Hartlepool	United Kingdom	For Messrs. R. Ropner & Co.
17 March	Plover	Steamship	Messrs. W. H. Potter & Co.	Liverpool	United Kingdom	For Messrs. C. T. Bowring & Co.
17 March	Taymouth Castle	Steamship	Messrs. Barclay, Curle & Co.	Whiteinch	United Kingdom	For Messrs. Donald Currie & Co.
19 March	Mora	Steamship	Messrs. Schlesinger, Davis & Co.	Wallsend	United Kingdom	For private owner.
27 March	Brutus	Steamship	Messrs. Aleander Stephen & Sons	Linthouse	United Kingdom	For Gebr. Anderson.
28 March	Devonia	Steamship	Barrow Shipbuilding Co.	Barrow-in-Furness	United Kingdom	For Barrow Ocean Steamship Co.
28 March	Triomphante	La Galissonnière-class ironclad		Rochefort	France	For French Navy.
29 March	Captain Parry	Steamship	Messrs. Richardson, Duck & Co	South Stockton	United Kingdom	For private owner.
29 March	Ellen Wignall	Schooner	Messrs. W. Allsup & Son	Preston	United Kingdom	For Messrs. John Wignall & Co.
29 March	Lombard	Steamship	Tyne Iron Shipbuilding Company (Limited)	Newcastle upon Tyne	United Kingdom	For T. H. Davidson & partners.
29 March	Pemba	Steamship	Messrs. A. & J. Inglis	Glasgow	United Kingdom	For private owner.
31 March	Bull	Steamship	Messrs. Raylton, Dixon & Co.	Middlesbrough	United Kingdom	For Messrs. James Watson & Co.
31 March	Duguay-Trouin	Duguay-Trouin-class cruiser	Arsenal de Cherbourg	Cherbourg	France	For French Navy.
31 March	Lobo	Barque	Osbourne, Graham & Co.	Sunderland	United Kingdom	For Shallcross & Higham.
31 March	Slieve Bawn	Clipper	Harland & Wolff	Belfast	United Kingdom	For W. P. Sinclair & Co.
31 March	No. 1	Steamship	Messrs. M'Intyre & Co.	Paisley	United Kingdom	For Messrs. Pile & Co.
March	Alsatian	Steamship	Bowdler, Chaffer & Co.	Seacombe	United Kingdom	For Frederick R. Leyland.
March	Anne	Ketch	C. Burt & Sons	Falmouth	United Kingdom	For Charles Kelway.
March	Ben Macdhui	Merchantman	Messrs. Barclay, Curle & Co.	Whiteinch	United Kingdom	For Messrs. Watson Bros.
March	Dochra	Barque	Messrs. Scott & Co.	Greenock	United Kingdom	For Messrs. Scott & Co.
March	Earl Granville	Merchantman	Messrs. Robert Duncan & Co	Port Glasgow	United Kingdom	For Messrs. John M'Alister & Sons.
March	Earl of Zetland	Steamship	Messrs. Fullarton & Co.	Paisley	United Kingdom	For private owner.
March	Earnock	Full-rigged ship	Messrs. Birrell, Stenhouse & Co.	Dumbarton	United Kingdom	For Messrs. Potter, Wilson & Co.
March	Kilmeny	Barque	Messrs. David & William Henderson	Partick	United Kingdom	For Messrs. Kerr, Newton & Co.
3 April	Jane	Humber Keel	George Brown	Wilmington	United Kingdom	For Joseph Barraclough.
9 April	Elsie	Steamship	Joseph L. Thompson	Sunderland	United Kingdom	For F. Gordon & Stamp.
12 April	Iris	Iris-class despatch vessel		Pembroke Dockyard	United Kingdom	For Royal Navy.
14 April	America	Full-rigged ship	Messrs. Archibald M'Millan & Son	Dumbarton	United Kingdom	For private owner.
14 April	Bengullion	Schooner	Mr. Rogers	Carrickfergus	United Kingdom	For Messrs. J. A. Mitchell and others.
14 April	Dee	Medina-class gunboat	Messrs. Palmer & Co. (Limited)	Jarrow	United Kingdom	For Royal Navy.
14 April	Don	Medina-class gunboat	Messrs. Palmer & Co. (Limited)	Jarrow	United Kingdom	For Royal Navy.
14 April	Express	Twin-hulled paddle steamer	Messrs. A. Leslie & Co.	Hebburn-on-Tyne	United Kingdom	For English Channel Steamship Co.
14 April	Foo-so	Ironclad	Messrs. Samuda Bros.	Cubitt Town	United Kingdom	For Imperial Japanese Navy.
14 April	King Docemo	Steamship	Messrs. Blackwood & Gordon	Port Glasgow	United Kingdom	For Messrs. Walsh Bros.
14 April	Margaret	Steam yacht	Barrow Ship Building Co. Ltd.	Barrow-in-Furness	United Kingdom	For private owner.
14 April	Melrose Abbey	Steamship	Messrs. T. Turnbull & Sons	Whitby	United Kingdom	For Messrs. Pyman, Watson & Co.
14 April	Venezuela	Steamship	Messrs. Hanna, Donald & Wilson	Paisley	United Kingdom	For Venezuela Railway Company.
16 April	Sea King	Steam yacht	Messrs. R. Duncan & Co.	Port Glasgow	United Kingdom	For private owner.
17 April	Counsellor	Steamship	Messrs. Aitken & Mansel	Whiteinch	United Kingdom	For Messrs. Thomas & James Harrison.
17 April	Fusō	Ironclad	Samuda Brothers	Cubitt Town	United Kingdom	For Imperial Japanese Navy.
17 April	Kongō	Kongō-class ironclad	Earle's Shipbuilding & Engineering Co.	Kingston upon Hull	United Kingdom	For Imperial Japanese Navy.
17 April	No. 16	Steam hopper barg	Messrs. Murdoch & Murray	Port Glasgow	United Kingdom	For Clyde Trustees.
18 April	Tweedsdale	Barque	Messrs. Barclay, Curle & Co.	Whiteinch	United Kingdom	For Messrs. J. & A. Roxburgh.
18 April	Wakefield	Steamship	Messrs. John Fullarton & Co.	Paisley	United Kingdom	For Messrs. Ferguson & MacGowan.
19 April	Sheila	Paddle steamer	Messrs. Caird & Co.	Greenock	United Kingdom	For Wemyss Bay Steamboat Company.
21 April	Codseeker	Schooner	Thomas Coffin & Co.	Port Clyde	Canada	For Reube B. Stoddart.
25 April	Drumtochty	Steamship	Messrs. Black & Noble	Montrose	United Kingdom	For Montrose, Arbroath, London, and Newcastle Steamship Company (Limited).
26 April	Pelican	Osprey-class sloop		Devonport	United Kingdom	For Royal Navy.
28 April	Aberfoyle	Steamship	Robert Thompson Jr.	Sunderland	United Kingdom	For Adam & Co.
28 April	Dunmore	Steamship	Barrow Ship Building Co. Ltd.	Barrow-in-Furness	United Kingdom	For St. Andrews S.S. Co Ltd.
28 April	Elliot	Barque	Messrs. Alexander Hall & Co.	Footdee	United Kingdom	For James Muir.
28 April	No Name	Merchantman	William Newall	Ellesmere Port	United Kingdom	For private owner.
28 April	Vindolana	Steamship	Messrs. Raylton, Dixon & Co.	Middlesbrough-on-Tees	United Kingdom	For private owner.
30 April	Firebrand	Forester-class gunboat	Messrs. James & George Thomson	Dalmuir	United Kingdom	For Royal Navy.
30 April	Lochiel	Steamship	Messrs. A. & J. Inglis	Glasgow	United Kingdom	For Messrs. D. Hutcheson & Co.
30 April	Perim	Steamship	London and Glasgow Shipbuilding and Engineering Co.	Govan	United Kingdom	For Messrs. R. W. Cousins & Co.
April	Benares	Barque	Messrs. H. Murray & Co.	Port Glasgow	United Kingdom	For Messrs. Watson Bros.
April	Carradale	Barque	Messrs. Dobie & Co.	Govan	United Kingdom	For Messrs. Manford, Stewart & Co.
April	Countess of Derby	Barque	Messrs. Birrell, Stonehouse & Co.	Dumbarton	United Kingdom	For Messrs. James Allison & Sons.
April	Eglinton	Merchantman	Messrs. M'Intyre & Co.	Paisley	United Kingdom	For private owner.
April	Francis Brodoe	Merchantman		Saundersfoot	United Kingdom	For private owner.
April	Loch Nell	Merchantman	Messrs. M'Intyre & Co.	Paisley	United Kingdom	For private owner.
April	Nousretieh	Ironclad	Thames Ironworks and Shipbuilding Company	Blackwall	United Kingdom	For Ottoman Navy.
April	Salamanca	Full-rigged ship	Messrs. J. & G. Thomson	Dalmuir	United Kingdom	For Messrs. Russell & Neilson.
1 May	Dublin Castle	Steamship	Messrs. R. Napier & Son	Glasgow	United Kingdom	For Messrs. Donald Currie & Co.
1 May	Eirene	Full-rigged ship	Messrs. Robert Steele & Co.	Greenock	United Kingdom	For William Rankin.
1 May	Loch Sloy	Steam lighter	Abercorn Shipbuilding Co.	Paisley	United Kingdom	For John Macfarlane.
1 May	Phryne	Yawl	Messrs. Camper & Nicholson	Gosport	United Kingdom	For Mr. Dickenson.
3 May	Ayrshire	Steamship	Messrs. William Hamilton & Co.	Port Glasgow	United Kingdom	For Messrs. Turnbull, Martin & Co.
3 May	Gazelle	Schooner	W. J. Curtis	Ipswich	United Kingdom	For W. J. Curtis and A. Beaumont.
3 May	Psyché	Steamship	Messrs. Alexander Stephen & Sons	Govan	United Kingdom	For MM. A. C. Le Quellec.
5 May	Mücke	Wespe-class gunboat	AG Weser	Bremen	Germany	For Kaiserliche Marine.
7 May	Seal	Tug	Messrs. Robert Duncan & Co.	Port Glasgow	United Kingdom	For Port-Glasgow Towing Co.
12 May	Bonaire	Frigate		Rotterdam	Netherlands	For Royal Netherlands Navy.
12 May	Lord Cairns	Sailing ship	Harland & Wolff	Belfast	United Kingdom	For T. Doxon Hughes Ltd.
12 May	Siren	Yacht	Messrs. Cunliffe & Dunlop	Greenock	United Kingdom	For James Coats Jr.
14 May	Livingstone	Schooner	M. Simpson	Glasson Dock	United Kingdom	For E. Porter.
14 May	Queen of Scots	Merchantman	Messrs. Richardson, Duck & Co.	South Stockton	United Kingdom	For Donald Kennedy.
15 May	Dumfriesshire	Barque	Messrs. Russell & Co.	Port Glasgow	United Kingdom	For Messrs. J. & W. Goffey & Co.
15 May	Tilkhurst	Full-rigged ship	Messrs. A. M'Millan & Son	Dumbarton	United Kingdom	For W. R. Price.
15 May	Waverley	Steamship	H. M'Intyre & Co.	Paisley	United Kingdom	For Messrs. William M'Lachlan & Co.
16 May	Lily of the Valley	Fishing smack	Messrs. Frederickson & Fawcett	Barton-upon-Humber	United Kingdom	For John Cable.
16 May	Marie	Steamship	Messrs. John Fullarton & Co.	Paisley	United Kingdom	For Messrs. M'Kinney & Rafferty.
17 May	Eunice	Steam yacht	Messrs. John Reid & Co.	Port Glasgow	United Kingdom	For Robert Neil.
17 May	Finesse	Yacht	Messrs. Atkinson & Son	Ringsend	United Kingdom	For E. Kinsley.
19 May	Scorpion	Wespe-class gunboat	AG Weser	Bremen	Germany	For Kaiserliche Marine.
18 May	Zealous	Steamship	Messrs. Raylton, Dixon & Co.	Middlesbrough	United Kingdom	For Messrs. E. S. Jobson & Co.
22 May	Saratoga	Steamship		Chester, Pennsylvania	United States	For New York and Cuba Line. Ten people were killed in an accident during launching. Up to 30 were injured.
24 May	Drumlithie	Steamship	Messrs. Black & Noble	Montrose	United Kingdom	For James Duthie.
29 May	Rising Star	Barque	Messrs. Birrell, Stenhouse & Co.	Dumbarton	United Kingdom	For H. H. Melmore.
30 May	Lord of the Isles	Paddle steamer	Messrs. D. & W. Henderson	Partick	United Kingdom	For Glasgow and Inveraray Steamboat Company.
30 May	City of Amsterdam	Steamship	Messrs. Richardson, Duck & Co.	South Stockton	United Kingdom	For Messrs. Palgrave, Murphy & Co.
30 May	Lady of the Lake	Steamship	Messrs. Scott & Macgill	Bowling	United Kingdom	For Messrs. Kemp & Hume.
30 May	Llanedarne	Steamship	Messrs. Schlesinger, Davis & Co.	Wallsend	United Kingdom	For Charles E. Stallybrass.
31 May	Harold	Steamship	Messrs. William Gray & Co.	West Hartlepool	United Kingdom	For Messrs. George Pyman & Co.
31 May	Return	Schooner	Messrs. Scott & Macgill	Bowling	United Kingdom	For Donald M'Arthur.
31 May	Rose Dale	Steamship	W. B. Thompson	Dundee	United Kingdom	For private owner.
May	Aberavon	Steamship	Messrs. Cunliffe & Dunlop	Greenock	United Kingdom	For G. J. Mackay.
May	Afrika	Cruiser	John Roach & Sons	Chester, Pennsylvania	United States	For Imperial Russian Navy.
May	Black Watch	Full-rigged ship	Bennett Smith	Windsor	Canada	For Bennett Smith and others.
May	Greta	Steam yacht	Messrs. Scott & Co.	Greenock	United Kingdom	For Messrs. Scott & Co.
May	Kenley	Steamship	Blumer & Co.	Sunderland	United Kingdom	For Lambert Bros.
May	Lethe	Yacht	Ebenezer Robertson	Ipswich	United Kingdom	For private owner.
May	Margaret	Steam yacht	Barrow-in-Furness Yacht and Shipbuilding Co.	Barrow-in-Furness	United Kingdom	For Mr. Jameson.
May	Mary Ann	Steamship	Messrs. H. M'Intyre & Co.	Paisleyh	United Kingdom	For Messrs. William M'Lachlan & Co.
May	Norma	Steamship	J. E. Scott	Cartsdyke	United Kingdom	For Humber Steam Shipping Company (Limited).
5 June	Dresden	Steamship	William Thompson	Dundee	United Kingdom	For Yorkshire Coal and Steamship Company.
6 June	Cruiser	Schooner	Barrow Ship Building Co. Ltd.	Barrow-in-Furness	United Kingdom	For Earl of Eglinton & Winton.
11 June	Hiei	Kongō-class ironclad	Milford Haven Shipbuilding & Engineering Co.	Pembroke Dock	United Kingdom	For Imperial Japanese Navy.
12 June	Durban	Steamship	James Laing	Sunderland	United Kingdom	For Union Steamship Co.
12 June	Louise Jenny	Steamship	Messrs. Lobnitz, Coulborn & Co.	Renfrew	United Kingdom	For MM. F. Mallett & Co.
12 June	Nantglyn	Schooner	William Thomas	Amlwch	United Kingdom	For Thomas Jones and others.
14 June	Raven Hill	Steamship	Messrs. Turnbull & Son	Whitby	United Kingdom	For private owner.
14 June	William Griffiths	Steamship	Messrs. Schlesinger, Davis & Co.	Newcastle upon Tyne	United Kingdom	For Messrs. Hurley, Matthews & Co.
16 June	Balcarres	Steamship	Barrow Ship Building Co. Ltd.	Barrow-in-Furness	United Kingdom	For Wigan Coal & Iron Co.
16 June	Gertrude	Smack	John Hadfield	Grimsby	United Kingdom	For Messrs. Plaistow & Lawson.
16 June	Marco Polo	Smack	John Hadfield	Grimsby	United Kingdom	For Messrs. Plaistow & Lawson.
16 June	Toiler of the Seas	Smack	John Hadfield	Grimsby	United Kingdom	For Mr. Bean.
26 June	John Paterson	Barque	P. Hardcastle & Co.	Pallion	United Kingdom	For Thomas Clark.
26 June	Lady of the Lake	Steamboat	T. B. Seath & Co.	Rutherglen / Pooley Bridge	United Kingdom	For Ullswater Steam Navigation Company. Built at Rutherglen, dismantled and reassembled at Pooley Bridge.
26 June	Marlborough	Steamship	Messrs. Raylton, Dixon & Co.	Middlesbrough-on-Tees	United Kingdom	For E. Pembroke.
26 June	Mary and Agnes	Steamship	Messrs. H. M'Intyre & Co.	Paisley	United Kingdom	For John M'Pherson, or Joseph MacPherson.
26 June	Otter	Gunboat		Elbing	Germany	For Kaiserliche Marine.
26 June	No. 18	Hopper barge	Messrs. Murdoch & Murray	Port Glasgow	United Kingdom	For Clyde Navigation Trust.
27 June	German	Steamship	Messrs. Denny Bros.	Dumbarton	United Kingdom	For Union Steamship Co.
28 June	Firefly	Forester-class gunboat	Messrs. J. & G. Thompson	Glasgow	United Kingdom	For Royal Navy.
28 June	Glengarry	Full-rigged ship	Messrs. Alexander Stephen & Sons	Dundee	United Kingdom	For W. D. Taylor and others.
28 June	Leonidas	Full-rigged ship	Messrs. Archibald M'Millan & Son	Dumbarton	United Kingdom	For Messrs. John Patton Jr., & Co.
30 June	Garnet	Emerald-class corvette		Chatham Dockyard	United Kingdom	For Royal Navy.
30 June	River Lagan	Barque	Harland & Wolff	Belfast	United Kingdom	For Messrs. Neill.
30 June	Shark	Steam yacht	William Simons & Co.	Renfrew	United Kingdom	For J. G. Mackie.
June	Carfin	Steamship	London and Glasgow Shipbuilding Company	Glasgow	United Kingdom	For Messrs. William Dixon (Limited).
June	Cheetah	Steam Yacht	W. Allsup & Sons	Preston	United Kingdom	For private owner.
June	Jeannie Landles	Full-rigged ship	Messrs. H. Murray & Co.	Port Glasgow	United Kingdom	For David Law.
June	Loch Etive	Steamship	Messrs. William Swan & Son	Maryhill	United Kingdom	For Messrs. William Sim & Co.
June	North Eastern	Steamship	Messrs. A. & J. Inglis	Partick	United Kingdom	For Ardrossan Shipping Co.
June	Pinzon	Steamship	Messrs. Alexander Stephen & Sons	Linthouse	United Kingdom	For Messrs. Robert MacAndrew & Co.
June	Ranger	Steamship	Messrs. R. Napier & Sons	Govan	United Kingdom	For Messrs. H. Martini & Co.
2 July	Reindeer	Fishing boat	A. Forsyth	Aberdeen	United Kingdom	For John Allan.
9 July	Edgar	Steamship	Messrs. Lobnitz, Coulborn & Co.	Paisley	United Kingdom	For West African Company.
9 July	Superb	Mersey flat	W. Bracegirdle & Co.	Leftwich	United Kingdom	For W. & G. Alcock.
10 July	Christine	Cutter	Messrs. Camper & Nicholson	Gosport	United Kingdom	For private owner.
11 July	Grangemouth	Steamship	Messrs. Archibald M'Millan & Son	Dumbarton	United Kingdom	For Messrs. Rankine & Son.
11 July	Lassa	East Indiaman	Messrs. Barclay, Curle & Co.	Whiteinch	United Kingdom	For Samuel Potter and Messrs. Thomson, Aikman & Co.
11 July	Medway	Steamship	Messrs. John Elder & Co.	Govan	United Kingdom	For Royal Mail Steam Packet Company.
11 July	Pericles	Merchantman	W. Hood & Co.	Aberdeen	United Kingdom	For Aberdeen Line.
12 July	Helmstedt	Steamship	Messrs. Edward Withy & Co.	Middleton	United Kingdom	For Messrs. R. Ropner & Co.
12 July	Marathon	Clipper	Pembroke Shipbuilding Company	Pembroke Dock	United Kingdom	For Messrs. Ogilby & Moore.
13 July	Rathlin	Steamship	Messrs. Blackwood & Gordon	Port Glasgow	United Kingdom	For Clyde Shipping Company.
14 July	Æthelred	Merchantman	Messrs. R. and J. Evans & Co.	Liverpool	United Kingdom	For Messrs. White, Foreman & Co.
14 July	Andalusian	Steamship	Bowdler, Chaffer & Co	Seacombe	United Kingdom	For F. Leyland & Co. Collided with Angerona on being launched, sinking Angerona.
14 July	Asdrubal	Steamship	Palmer's Shipbuilding and Iron Co. Ltd.	Jarrow	United Kingdom	For Messrs. Hall Bros.
14 July	Drumpark	Steamship	Messrs. W. H. Potter & Son	Liverpool	United Kingdom	For Messrs. Gillison & Chadwick.
14 July	Euclid	Steamship	Messrs. Hall, Russell & Co.	Footdee	United Kingdom	For Messrs. Lamport & Holt.
14 July	Glensannox	Steamship	Barrow Ship Building Co. Ltd.	Barrow-in-Furness	United Kingdom	For S. Johnston & Co.
14 July	Scottish Lassie	Barque	Messrs. A. Hall & Co.	Aberdeen	United Kingdom	For Messrs. M'Ilwraith, M'Eacharn & Co.
21 July	Sachsen	Sachsen-class ironclad	AG Vulcan	Stettin	Germany	For Kaiserliche Marine.
24 July	Saraca	Barque	Messrs. Birrell, Stenhouse & Co.	Dumbarton	United Kingdom	For L. Macpherson.
25 July	Bismarck	Bismarck-class corvette	Norddeutsche Schiffbau-Gesellschaft	Kiel	Germany	For Kaiserliche Marine.
26 July	Baltic	Schooner	Messrs. Carnegie & Matthew	Peterhead	United Kingdom	For R. J. Kidd.
26 July	Burgedin	Schooner	Robert Jones	Voryd	United Kingdom	For Messrs. William Aaron & Co.
26 July	Lady Ann	Collier	Austin & Hunter	Sunderland	United Kingdom	For Earl of Durham.
26 July	Star of Italy	Sailing ship	Harland & Wolff	Belfast	United Kingdom	For J. P. Corry & Co.
26 July	Yarm	Steamship	Messrs. William Gray & Co.	West Hartlepool	United Kingdom	For Messrs. Coverdalem Merryweather & Todd.
27 July	Frank Stanley	Steamship	Messrs. Millward & Bannbridge	Cardiff	United Kingdom	For private owner.
27 July	Torrens	Dredger	W. Simons & Co	Renfrew	United Kingdom	For South Australian Company.
28 July	Lofna	Steamship	Messrs. Wigham, Richardson & Co	Newcastle upon Tyne	United Kingdom	For Messrs. J. T. Salveson & Co.
28 July	Snowdon	Barque	Messrs. Russell & Co.	Port Glasgow	United Kingdom	For Davis, Jones & Co.
30 July	Amy	Steamship	Barrow Ship Building Co. Ltd.	Barrow-in-Furness	United Kingdom	For James J. Bibby.
30 July	Bendigo	Steamship	Barrow Ship Building Co. Ltd.	Barrow-in-Furness	United Kingdom	For Joseph Hoult.
30 July	Tweed	Tug	Messrs. John Fullarton & Co	Paisley	United Kingdom	For Fore and Aft Screw Tug Co.
July	J. H. M.	Merchantman		Milford Haven	United Kingdom	For private owner.
July	Orestes	Steamship	Scott & Co.	Greenock	United Kingdom	For Alfred Holt.
July	Palm Flower	Steam yacht	Messrs. William Hamilton & Co.	Greenock	United Kingdom	For Pryce Hamilton.
July	Sea Ranger	Fishing dandy	J. C. Tolman	Hull	United Kingdom	For R. Hellyear.
July	Summerlee	Steamship	Messrs. J. & G. Thompson	Dalmuir	United Kingdom	For Summerlee Iron Co.
1 August	Cyclops	Fishing smack	Mr. Gilbert	Hull	United Kingdom	For C. W. Ansell.
1 August	King Koffi	Steamship	James E. Scott	Cartsdyke	United Kingdom	For Messrs. Alexander Miller, Brother, & Co.
3 August	The Grant	Herring buss	Mr. Caddell	Cockenzie	United Kingdom	For Mr. Caddell.
7 August	Albert	Fishing smack	George Brown	Hull	United Kingdom	For M. J. Robins.
7 August	Ich Dien	Tug	Messrs. Cunliffe & Dunlop	Port Glasgow	United Kingdom	For Aberdeen and London Steam Navigation Co.
7 August	Sleipner	Gunboat	Karljohansvern	Horten	Norway	For Royal Norwegian Navy.
9 August	Albert & Edward	Steamship	Joseph L. Thompson	Sunderland	United Kingdom	For F. Gordon & Stamp.
9 August	Lizzie	Brigantine	John Rees	Hakin	United Kingdom	For John Rees.
11 August	Caroline Spooner	Barque	John F. Evans	Aberystwyth	United Kingdom	For John F. Evans and others.
11 August	Lady Glover	Steamship	Messrs. Allsup	Preston	United Kingdom	For William P. Munn.
11 August	Malabar	Steamship	Messrs. Raylton, Dixon & Co.	Middlesbrough-on-Tees	United Kingdom	For private owner.
13 August	Vzreef	Torpedo boat	Messrs. Baird	Saint Petersburg	Russia	For Imperial Russian Navy.
14 August	Hereward	Full-rigged ship	Robert Duncan & Co.	Port Glasgow	United Kingdom	For John Campbell, John Potter and others.
22 August	Draak	Ram monitor	Rijkswerf	Amsterdam	Netherlands	For Royal Netherlands Navy.
23 August	Trent	Medina-class gunboat	Palmers Shipbuilding & Iron Co.	Jarrow	United Kingdom	For Royal Navy.
23 August	Tween	Medina-class gunboat	Palmers Shipbuilding & Iron Co.	Jarrow	United Kingdom	For Royal Navy.
24 August	Batavia No. 1	Dredger	Messrs. Thomas Wingate & Co.	Whiteinch	United Kingdom	For Dutch Government.
25 August	Scottish Minstrel	Merchantman	Messrs. Richardson, Duck & Co.	South Stockton-on-Tees	United Kingdom	For Messrs. W. H. Ross & Co.
25 August	Sherborne	Steamship	Messrs. Edward Withy & Co.	Middleton	United Kingdom	For Edward Pembroke.
25 August	Thessaly	Steamship	Messrs. Laird Bros.	Birkenhead	United Kingdom	For David MacIver.
27 August	Gartconnel	Clipper	Messrs. John Reid & Co.	Port Glasgow	United Kingdom	For Messrs. James Richardson & Co.
28 August	Glenlogan	Steamship	Barrow Ship Building Co. Ltd.	Barrow-in-Furness	United Kingdom	For S. Johnston & Co.
30 August	City of Washington	Steamship	John Roach & Sons	Chester, Pennsylvania	United States	For Alexandre & Sons.
30 August	Éclaireur	Rigault de Genouilly-class cruiser	Arsenal de Toulon	Toulon	France	For French Navy.
August	Adela	Paddle steamer	Caird and Company	Greenock	United Kingdom	For private owner.
August	Dunkeld	Barque	Messrs. A. M'Millan & Sons	Dumbarton	United Kingdom	For Messrs. Finlayson Bros.
August	Hilda	Merchantman	Messrs. G. Williams & John Owen	Portmadoc	United Kingdom	For private owner.
August	Lurgan, of Lurgan	Flatboat	Messrs. M'Ilwaine & Lewis	Belfast	United Kingdom	For private owner.
August	Marie Kaestner	Merchantman	Simon Jones	Portmadoc	United Kingdom	For private owner.
August	Queen of the South	Steamship	Messrs. H. Macintyre & Co.	Paisley	United Kingdom	For private owner.
Unknown date	Shirley	Schooner	C. Burt & Sons	Falmouth	United Kingdom	For Edward Anderton.
August	Solis	Steamship	Messrs. Alexander Stephen & Sons.	Govan	United Kingdom	For Messrs. Robert MacAndrew & Co.
August	Stirlingshire	Barque	Messrs. Birrell, Stenhouse & Co.	Dumbarton	United Kingdom	For Messrs. Thomas Law & Co.
August	Tolfaen	Steamship	Messrs. Allsup	Preston	United Kingdom	For Messrs. Marshall, Upton & Co.
August	Walrus	Tug	R. Duncan & Co.	Port Glasgow	United Kingdom	For Port-Glasgow Towing Co.
August	Warwick Castle	Steamship	Messrs. Robert Napier & Sons	Glasgow	United Kingdom	For Messrs. Donald Currie & Co.
5 September	Debonair	Schooner	Archibald Boyd	Ardrossan	United Kingdom	For private owner.
5 September	Nicaragua	Steamship	Messrs. Black & Noble	Montros	United Kingdom	For Nicaragua Steam Navigation Co.
6 September	James Groves	Steamship	Messrs. William Gray & Co.	West Hartlepool	United Kingdom	For Messrs. Groves, M'Lean & Co.
7 September	Prinz Eugen	Kaiser Max-class ironclad	Pola Naval Arsenal	Pola	Austria-Hungary	For Austro-Hungarian Navy.
8 September	Amanda	Steamship	Messrs. William Gray & Co.	West Hartlepool	United Kingdom	For Otto Trechmann.
8 September	Bridget Annie	Schooner	Messrs. D. Noble & Co.	Barrow-in-Furness	United Kingdom	For J. Ashcroft.
8 September	Curfew	Steamship	Messrs. Gourlay Bros.	Dundee	United Kingdom	For Messrs. R. A. Mudie & Sons.
8 September	Glanperis	Merchantman	William Doxford & Sons	Sunderland	United Kingdom	For Jones & Williams.
8 September	Kinross	Clipper	W. H. Potter & Son	Liverpool	United Kingdom	For Messrs. Andrew Gibsopn & Co.
8 September	Osprey	Steamship	Messrs. M. Pearse & Co.	Stockton-on-Tees	United Kingdom	For General Steam Navigation Company.
8 September	Sirius	Fishing smack	Baltic Iron Works	Kingston upon Hull	United Kingdom	For G. J. A. Drake.
10 September	Abertay	Lightship	Reney	Arbroath	United Kingdom	For Trinity House.
10 September	Stuart	Barque	Messrs. Stephen & Sons	Dundee	United Kingdom	For Messrs. John Hay & Sons.
11 September	Chinsura	Steamship	Messrs. William Denny & Bros.	Dumbarton	United Kingdom	For British India Steam Navigation Company (Limited).
12 September	Cormorant	Osprey-class sloop		Chatham Dockyard	United Kingdom	For Royal Navy.
19 September	Guide	Fishing smack	Baltic Engine Works	Hull	United Kingdom	For Messrs. Hailstones & Leetham.
20 September	Blücher	Bismarck-class corvette	Norddeutsche Schiffbau-Gesellschaft	Kiel	Germany	For Kaiserliche Marine.
20 September	Elizabeth	Schooner	John Watson	Banff	United Kingdom	For private owner.
24 September	Altmore	Steamship	Robert Thompson Jr.	Sunderland	United Kingdom	For Adam & Co.
24 September	County of Denbigh	Barque	William Doxford & Sobns	Sunderland	United Kingdom	For private owner.
25 September	George Knox	Barque	Messrs. Alexander Stephen & Sons	Linthouse	United Kingdom	For George Knox.
25 September	Lord Nelson	Fishing smack	Healam	Thorne	United Kingdom	For John Batty.
26 September	Cambronne	Steamship	Messrs. Schlesinger, Davis & Co.	Wallsend	United Kingdom	For Louis Guèret.
26 September	Conway Castle	Steamship	Messrs. Robert Napier & Sons	Glasgow	United Kingdom	For Messrs. Donald Currie & Sons.
26 September	Lepanto	Steamship	Messrs. Earle's Shipbuilding Co.	Hull	United Kingdom	For Wilson Line.
27 September	Commander	Steamship	Barrow Ship Building Co. Ltd.	Barrow-in-Furness	United Kingdom	For T. & J. Harrison.
27 September	John Sims	Ketch	George W. Brown & Sons	Hull	United Kingdom	For Jabez J. Hobbs.
28 September	Halcyon	Steamship	Messrs. Raylton, Dixon & Co.	Middlesbrough	United Kingdom	For private owner.
September	Astarte	Barque	Messrs. Barclay, Curle & Co.	Whiteinch	United Kingdom	For private owner.
September	Bella Donna	Schooner	Charles W. Aubin	Jersey	(United Kingdom of Great Britain and Ireland) Jersey	For Philip Le Gresley.
September	Doris	Steamship	Messrs. William Swan & Sons	Maryhill	United Kingdom	For Mories, Munro & Co.
September	Look Out	Fishing trawler	J. M. Briggs	Hull	United Kingdom	For Joshua Loughton.
September	Maraval	Full-rigged ship	Messrs. Archibald M'Millan & Son	Dumbarton	United Kingdom	For Messrs. William Kenneth & Co.
September	Ormsa	Steam lighter	Messrs. H. M'Intyre & Co.	Paisley	United Kingdom	For Messrs. Ross & Marshall.
September	Renown	Fishing smack	Curtis	Ipswich	United Kingdom	For Mr. Letten.
September	River Leven	Barque	Messrs. Alexander Stephen & Son	Linthouse	United Kingdom	For private owner.
September	South Milton	Barque	J. Crown	Sunderland	United Kingdom	For B. Balkwill & Co.
September	Trafalgar	Full-rigged ship	Messrs. Charles Connell & Co.	Scotstoun	United Kingdom	For Messrs. W. & Alfred Brown & Co.
6 October	Blenheim	Steamship	Messrs. Edward Withy & Co.	Middleton	United Kingdom	For Messrs. Steel, Young & Co.
6 October	Doon	Barque	London and Glasgow Shipbuilding Co.	Glasgow	United Kingdom	For David Hunter.
6 October	Hartburn	Yacht	William Weatherall	Hartburn/Stockton-on-Tees	United Kingdom	For private owner. Built at Hartburn, transported by road to Stockton-on-Tees for launch.
6 October	Rosedale	Steamship	James Laing	Sunderland	United Kingdom	For T. G. Beatley & Co.
8 October	Anatolian	Steamship	Bowdler, Chaffer & Co.	Seacombe	United Kingdom	For Frederick R. Leyland.
8 October	Moray	Steamship	Messrs. Aitken & Mansel	Whiteinch	United Kingdom	For Messrs. John Warnock & Co.
8 October	Stosch	Bismarck-class corvette	AG Vulcan	Stettin	Germany	For Kaiserliche Marine.
9 October	Joseph Ferens	Steamship	Messrs. C. Mitchell & Co.	Low Walker	United Kingdom	For Messrs. Hunting & Pattison.
9 October	Marchesa	Steam yacht	Messrs. Lobnitz, Coulborn & Co.	Renfrew	United Kingdom	For Marquess of Ailsa.
9 October	Tandjong Priok No. 2	Dredger	Messrs. T. Wingate & Co.	Whiteinch	United Kingdom	For Dutch Government.
11 October	Bessbrook	Steamship	Messrs. A. & J. Inglis	Pointhouse	United Kingdom	For Dundalk and Newry Steam Packet Co.
11 October	Buteshire	Steamship	Messrs. William Hamilton & Co.	Port Glasgow	United Kingdom	For Messrs. Martin, Turnbull & Co.
11 October	Isabella	Paddle steamer	Messrs. Laird Bros.	Birkenhead	United Kingdom	For London and North Western Railway.
11 October	Yatala	Paddle tug	Messrs. Blackwood & Gordon	Port Glasgow	United Kingdom	For Henry Skelton.
18 October	Moltke	Bismarck-class corvette	Kaiserliche Werft	Danzig	Germany	For Kaiserliche Marine.
22 October	Swift	Schooner	Mr. Rogers	Carrickfergus	United Kingdom	For Charles M'Eachran.
23 October	Cædmon	Steamship	Messrs. Turnbull & Son	Whitby	United Kingdom	For private owner.
23 October	Dalton	Steamship	Messrs. M. Pearse & Co.	Stockton-on-Tees	United Kingdom	For private owner.
23 October	Indus	Steamship	Messrs. C. S. Swan & Co.	Wallsend-on-Tyne	United Kingdom	For Messrs. Glover Bros.
23 October	Leverrier	Steamship	Bartram, Haswell & Co.	Sunderland	United Kingdom	For Wilkie & Turnbull.
23 October	Romsdal	Full-rigged ship	Messrs. Robert Steele & Co.	Greenock	United Kingdom	For Messrs. J. & A. Allan.
23 October	Wyberton	Steamship	Messrs. Raylton, Dixon & Co.	Middlesbrough	United Kingdom	For Commercial Steamship Co.
25 October	Diamond	Steamship	Messrs. Gourlay Brothers, & Co.	Dundee	United Kingdom	For Mr. Duncan.
25 October	Kwangtang, or	Steamship	Messrs. Hall, Russell & Co.	Aberdeen	United Kingdom	For Messrs. Douglas, Lapraik & Co.
25 October	Valhalla	Steamship	Messrs. William Gray & Co.	West Hartlepool	United Kingdom	For F. Herskind.
27 October	Elissa	Barque	Alexander Hall & Co.	Aberdeen	United Kingdom	For Henry Fowler Watt.
27 October	Vasari	Steam yacht	Messrs. Day & Sumner	Southampton	United Kingdom	For King Rameses V of Siam.
30 October	Twilight	Steam lighter	Messrs. H. M'Intyre & Co	Merksworth	United Kingdom	For Messrs. Ross & Marshall.
October	China	Steamship	Messrs. Readhead & Sons	South Shields	United Kingdom	For Red Cross Line.
October	Dunand	Barque	Messrs. Dobie & Co.	Govan	United Kingdom	For Messrs. James Dunn & Sons.
October	Emma Louise	Schooner	Apps	Bosham	United Kingdom	For Clement Crosskey.
October	Florence	Full-rigged ship	Goss & Sawyer	Bath, Maine	United States	For Charles Davenport.
October	Mabel Clarke	Merchantman		Waldoboro, Maine	United States	For J. H. Smith & Co.
October	Nebo	Full-rigged ship	Messrs. Dobie & Co.	Govan	United Kingdom	For John Smith.
October	Norman	Steamship	Messrs. H. M'Intosf & Co.	Paisley	United Kingdom	For Messrs. J. & J. M'Farlane.
October	Prinses Marie	Paddle steamer	Messrs. John Elder & Co.	Fairfield	United Kingdom	For Stoomvaart Maatschappij Zeeland.
October	Samarkand	Merchantman	Messrs. Barclay, Curle & Co.	Whiteinch	United Kingdom	For Messrs. W. & G. Crawford.
October	Satellite	Steam launch	Messrs. Thomas B. Seath & Co.	Rutherglen	United Kingdom	For private owner.
5 November	Lapérouse	Lapérouse-class cruiser	Arsenal de Brest	Brest	France	For French Navy.
5 November	Opobo	Steamship	Liverpool Forge and Shipbuilding Co.	Liverpool	United Kingdom	For African Royal Mail Steamship Co.
6 November	Kerangie	Steamship	London and Glasgow Shipbuilding Co.	Govan	United Kingdom	For John M'Ilwraith.
6 November	Loch Sloy	Full-rigged ship	Messrs. D. & W. Henderson & Co.	Partick	United Kingdom	For Glasgow Shipping Co.
6 November	Mary Ashburner	Schooner	William Ashburner	Barrow-in-Furness	United Kingdom	For Thomas Ashburner & Co. Ltd.
6 November	Teucer	Steamship	Messrs. Scott & Co.	Greenock	United Kingdom	For Alfred Holt.
7 November	Ailsa	Steamship	Messrs. Aitken & Mansel	Partick	United Kingdom	For Atlas Steamship Co.
7 November	Eulomene	Merchantman	W. H. Potter & Son	Liverpool	United Kingdom	For Messrs. Henry Fernie & Sons.
7 November	Mourino	Steamship	Messrs. Schlesinger, Davis & Co.	Wallsend	United Kingdom	For Messrs. W. E. Bolt & Co.
8 November	Mercator	Steamship	Messrs. Alexander Stephen & Sons	Linthouse	United Kingdom	For T. C. Engels.
8 November	Sandhurst	Full-rigged ship	Messrs. A. M'Millan & Son	Dumbarton	United Kingdom	For Messrs. William R. Price & Co.
8 November	Velocity	Fishing smack	Ebenezer Robertson	Ipswich	United Kingdom	For George Hart.
9 November	Alpha	Coaster	Messrs. William Swan & Son	Maryhill	United Kingdom	For John Reid.
9 November	Orthes	Full-rigged ship	Messrs. James & George Thomson	Clydebannk	United Kingdom	For Messrs. Hugh Neilson & Archibald Russell.
12 November	Saga	Corvette		Karlskrona	Sweden	For Royal Swedish Navy.
14 November	William Symington	Steamship	Joseph L. Thompson	Sunderland	United Kingdom	For J. Marychurch & Co.
19 November	Beaconsfield	Sloop	Messrs. Carnegie & Matthew	Peterhead	United Kingdom	For Woodger & Co.
19 November	George Fisher	Steamship	Messrs. Richardson, Duck & Co.	South Stockton	United Kingdom	For Messrs. Edward H. Capper & Co.
20 November	Bantam	Steam hopper barge	Messrs. Thomas Wingate & Sons	Whiteinch	United Kingdom	For Dutch Government.
20 November	Clydebank	Barque	Messrs. Birrel, Stenhouse & Co.	Dumbarton	United Kingdom	For Messrs. George Gray Macfarlane & Co.
20 November	Sicilian	Steamship	Messrs. E. Withy & Co.	Hartlepool	United Kingdom	For Messrs. H. Blaik & Co.
21 November	Mabel Young	Barque	Alexander Stephen & Sons	Linthouse	United Kingdom	For Messrs. Killick, Martin & Co.
21 November	Orator	Steamship	Messrs. C. Mitchell & Co.	Low Walker	United Kingdom	For private owner.
21 November	Star of France	Sailing ship	Harland & Wolff	Belfast	United Kingdom	For J. P. Corry & Co.
22 November	Afghan	Steamship	Messrs. Aitken & Mansel	Whiteinch	United Kingdom	For Messrs. Gellatly, Hankey, Sewell & Co.
22 November	Alverton	Steamship	Messrs. William Gray & Co.	West Hartlepool	United Kingdom	For Messrs. Middleton & Co.
22 November	Liffey	Trawling smack	George Brown	Hull	United Kingdom	For C. Pickering.
22 November	Loch Etive	Full-rigged ship	Messrs. A. & J. Inglis	Pointhouse	United Kingdom	For General Shipping Company.
24 November	Earl of Ulster	Paddle steamer	Barrow Iron Shipbuilding Co.	Barrow-in-Furness	United Kingdom	For North Lancashire Steam Navigastion Co.
24 November	Good Design	Fishing smack	W. J. Curtis	Ipswich	United Kingdom	For W. T. Beeson.
24 November	Otter	Steamship	Messrs. H. M'Intyre & Co.	Paisley	United Kingdom	For Messrs. Newcomb & Thomson.
26 November	Lady Ellen	Sailing barge	Messrs. Bailey	Ipswich	United Kingdom	For Jeremiah Read.
4 December	Brenda	Full-rigged ship	Messrs. Charles Connell & Co.	Scotstoun	United Kingdom	For Messrs. Sandbach, Tinne & Co.
4 December	North Western	Steamship	Messrs. A. & J. Inglis	Pointhouse	United Kingdom	For Ardrossan Shipping Co.
5 December	Overdale	Barque	Messrs. Alexander Stephen & Sons	Dundee	United Kingdom	For Messrs. John Hay & Co.
5 December	Raleigh's Cross	Steamship	Messrs. Schlesinger, Davis & Co.	Wallsend	United Kingdom	For James Ware.
5 December	Sestao	Steamship	Alfred Simey & Co.	Sunderland	United Kingdom	For Messrs. Johnson, Limpricht & Co.
5 December	Stormcock	Tug	Messrs. Laird Bros.	Birkenhead	United Kingdom	For Messrs. James Newton & Co.
6 December	Loch Shiel	Clipper	Messrs. D. & W. Henderson & Co.	Partick	United Kingdom	For Glasgow Shipping Co.
7 December	Nesta	Schooner	William Thomas	Amlwch	United Kingdom	For S. R. Platt.
8 December	Annie Florence	Collier	Mr. Foster	Emsworth	United Kingdom	For Mr. Foster.
8 December	Ophelia	Steamship	Abercorn Shipbuilding Co.	Paisley	United Kingdom	For Messrs. Francis N. Baird & Co.
10 December	Prinses Elizabeth	Paddle steamer	Messrs. John Elder & Co.	Govan	United Kingdom	For Stoomvaart Maatschappij Zeeland.
13 December	Wyndcliffe	Steamship	Messrs. Palmer & Co.	Newcastle upon Tyne	United Kingdom	For Douglas H. Morgan.
18 December	Ely Rise	Steamship	Short Brothers	Pallion	United Kingdom	For Hurley, Matthews & Co.
19 December	Visurgis	Barque	Messrs. Alexander Stephen & Sons	Govan	United Kingdom	For Messrs. D. H. Wätjen & Co.
20 December	Eclipse	Steamship	Messrs. M. Pearse & Co.	Stockton-on-Tees	United Kingdom	For private owner.
22 December	Badger	Steamship	Messrs. H. M'Intyre & Co.	Paisley	United Kingdom	For Messrs. Newcomb & Thomson.
22 December	Raglan	Steamship	Palmer's Shipbuilding and Iron Company, Limited	Jarrow	United Kingdom	For Messrs. John Cory & Sons.
22 December	Streonshalh	Steamship	Messrs. T. Turbull & Son	Whitby	United Kingdom	For private owner.
25 December	Macduff	Full-rigged ship	Messrs. Archbald M'Millan & Sons	Dumbarton	United Kingdom	For private owner.
December	Tromp	Atjeh-class cruiser	Rijkswerf	Amsterdam	United Kingdom	For Royal Netherlands Navy.
Unknown date	Active	Ketch			New South Wales	For private owner.
Unknown date	Ada	Yacht	Messrs. Barclay, Curle & Co.	Whiteinch	United Kingdom	For private owner.
Unknown date	Adamantine	Barquentine	Blumer & Co	Sunderland	United Kingdom	For J. Melmore.
Unknown date	Ada Melmore	Barque	Messrs. William Hamilton & Co.	Port Glasgow	United Kingdom	For private owner.
Unknown date	Adara	Merchantman	Mounsey & Foster	Sunderland	United Kingdom	For R. H. Penney & Co.
Unknown date	Agnes	Ketch		Eagleton	New South Wales	For private owner.
Unknown date	Airy	Merchantman	Bartram, Haswell & Co.	Sunderland	United Kingdom	For Wilkie & Turnbull.
Unknown date	Alert	Steamship	Robert Duncan & Co.	Port Glasgow	United Kingdom	For Huddart Parker.
Unknown date	Alliance	Merchantman	James Laing	Sunderland	United Kingdom	For T. R. Thompson.
Unknown date	Annie	Merchantman	Joseph L. Thompson	Sunderland	United Kingdom	For Jenneson, Taylor & Co.
Unknown date	Antonio	Merchantman	William Doxford & Sons	Sunderland	United Kingdom	For The Steam Navigation Co (Nord) Ltd.
Unknown date	Arabella	Merchantman	William Pickersgill	Sunderland	United Kingdom	For J. Tedford & Co.
Unknown date	Barbara	Barque	William Doxford & Sonbs	Sunderland	United Kingdom	For William Thomas & others.
Unknown date	Bear	Steamship	Messrs. Raylton, Dixon & Co.	Middlesbrough	United Kingdom	For private owner.
Unknown date	Benarty	Steamship	Messrs. Barclay, Curle & Co.	Whiteinch	United Kingdom	For private owner.
Unknown date	Ben Venue	Merchantman	James Laing	Sunderland	United Kingdom	For J. Morrison & Sons.
Unknown date	Ben Voirlich	Merchantman	James Laing	Sunderland	United Kingdom	For J. Morrison & Sons.
Unknown date	Beta	Fishing trawler	Bell & Trolley	Grimsby	United Kingdom	For John Trolley.
Unknown date	Bickley	Steamship	Alfred Simey & Co.	Sunderland	United Kingdom	For G. Heyn & Sons Ltd.
Unknown date	Boyne	Full-rigged ship	T. R. Oswald	Southampton	United Kingdom	For private owner.
Unknown date	Britannia	Merchantman	Short Brothers	Sunderland	United Kingdom	For J. W. Taylor & Son.
Unknown date	Caesarea	Full-rigged ship	William Doxford & Sons	Sunderland	United Kingdom	For William Pellier.
Unknown date	Cannanore	Merchantman	P. Hardcastle & Co	Sunderland	United Kingdom	For J. D. de Wolf & Co.
Unknown date	Cape Breton	Full-rigged ship	James & George Thomson	Dalmuir	United Kingdom	For private owner.
Unknown date	Cape St. Vincent	Full-rigged ship	James & George Thomson	Dalmuir	United Kingdom	For private owner.
Unknown date	Caroline Morris	Merchantman	William Doxford & Sons	Sunderland	United Kingdom	For T. Benyon & Co.
Unknown ndate	Castello	Steamship	Messrs. Richardson, Duck & Co.	South Stockton	United Kingdom	For private owner.
Unknown date	Celestial Empire	Full-rigged ship	Osbourne, Graham & Co.	Sunderland	United Kingdom	For G. Duncan & Co.
Unknown date	Charlwood	Barque	William Doxford & Sons	Sunderland	United Kingdom	For G. H. Fletcher & Co.
Unknown date	Cleopatra	Cylinder ship	Thames Ironworks and Shipbuilding Company	Leamouth	United Kingdom	For private owner.
Unknown date	Columbine	Schooner	Charles W. Aubin	Jersey	(United Kingdom of Great Britain and Ireland) Jersey	For Francis Coleman.
Unknown date	Colwyn	Merchantman	William Doxford & Sons	Sunderland	United Kingdom	For G. Traill & Sons.
Unknown date	Cotherstone	Merchantman	Short Bros.	Sunderland	United Kingdom	For J. S. Barwick.
Unknown date	County of Flint	Merchantman	William Doxford & Sons	Sunderland	United Kingdom	For William Thomas & Co.
Unknown date	Crest	Steamship	Joseph L. Thompson	Sunderland	United Kingdom	For Dent, Hodgson & Co.
Unknown date	Czarina	Schooner	Messrs. Camper & Nicholson	Gosport	United Kingdom	For private owner.
Unknown date	Dago	Merchantman	James Laing	Sunderland	United Kingdom	For D. G. Pinkney.
Unknown date	Dartford	Full-rigged ship	Mounsey & Foster	Sunderland	United Kingdom	For J. T. Morton.
Unknown date	Davis K. Philips	Fishing vessel			United States	For private owner.
Unknown date	Deronda	Steamship	Joseph L. Thompson	Sunderland	United Kingdom	For Culliford & Clark.
Unknown date	Dunard	Barque	Dobie & Co.	Govan	United Kingdom	For private owner.
Unknown date	Dunelm	Steamship	Blumer & Co	Sunderland	United Kingdom	For W. H. Crookes and others.
Unknown date	Efficient	Merchantman	Short Bros.	Sunderland	United Kingdom	For Anderson, Horan & Co.
Unknown date	Elizabeth	Thames barge	Peter Blaker	Crayford	United Kingdom	For John Coleby.
Unknown date	Elspeth	Steamship	James and George Thomson	Dalmuir	United Kingdom	For private owner.
Unknown date	Emma Eliza	Fishing trawler	Bessy & Palmer	Great Yarmouth	United Kingdom	For Edward F. Mahlendorff.
Unknown date	Eva	Mersey flat	Brundrit & Co.	Runcorn	United Kingdom	For private owner.
Unknown date	Fatala	Paddle steamer	Rathling & Gordon	Port Glasgow	United Kingdom	For private owner.
Unknown date	Firefly	Steam yacht	James & George Thomson	Dalmuir	United Kingdom	For private owner.
Unknown date	Esk Holme	Merchantman	Joseph L. Thompson	Sunderland	United Kingdom	For Hine Bros.
Unknown date	Eva	Fishing trawler	Bell & Trolley	Grimsby	United Kingdom	For Robert Little and others.
Unknown date	Fearless	Fishing trawler			United States	For private owner.
Unknown date	Fitzroy	Steamship	Bartram, Haswell & Co.	Sunderland	United Kingdom	For Wilkie & Turnbull.
Unknown date	Gamma	Fishing trawler	Bell & Trolley	Grimsby	United Kingdom	For John & George Trolley.
Unknown date	Gateacre	Full-rigged ship	William Doxford & Sons	Sunderland	United Kingdom	For C. W. Kellock & Co.
Unknown date	Gem	Steam launch	White	Cowes	United Kingdom	For private owner.
Unknown date	General Nott	Barque	Austin & Hunter	Sunderland	United Kingdom	For Thomas Morris.
Unknown date	Glanpadarn	Merchantman	William Doxford & Sons	Sunderland	United Kingdom	For Jones & Williams.
Unknown date	Glenericht	Merchantman	Mounsey & Foster	Sunderland	United Kingdom	For L. H. MacIntyre & Co.
Unknown date	Gleniffer	Merchantman	Mounsey & Foster	Sunderland	United Kingdom	For McGregor, Gow & Co.
Unknown date	Governor Stone	Schooner		Pascagoula, Mississippi	United States	For Charles Greiner.
Unknown date	Gwynedd	Barque	Osbourne, Graham & Co	Sunderland	United Kingdom	For North Wales Shipping Co. Ltd.
Unknown date	Halia	Merchantman	J. Gardner	Sunderland	United Kingdom	For R. Humble.
Unknown date	Harold	Steamship	Messrs. Richardson, Duck & Co.	South Stockton	United Kingdom	For private owner.
Unknown date	Henrietta	Merchantman	Mounsey & Foster	Sunderland	United Kingdom	For Eills & Co.
Unknown date	Imbos	Steamship	Messrs. Richardson, Duck & Co.	South Stockton	United Kingdom	For private owner.
Unknown date	Isabella	Paddle steamer	Laird Bros.	Birkenhead	United Kingdom	For London and North Western Railway.
Unknown date	Jeannie	Yacht	Messrs. Birrell, Stenhouse & Co.	Dumbarton	United Kingdom	For private owner.
Unknowndate	Jessica	Merchantman	J. E. Scott	Cartsdyle	United Kingdom	For private owner.
Unknown date	Jubilee	Steamship	William Harkness	Middlesbrough	United Kingdom	For Henry Pease.
Unknown date	Kate	Merchantman	William Pickersgill	Sunderland	United Kingdom	For J. and J. Denholm.
Unknown date	Kenton	Merchantman	William Doxford & Sons	Sunderland	United Kingdom	For G. Stavers & Co.
Unknown date	Kirkdale	Merchantman	William Doxford & Sons	Sunderland	United Kingdom	For J. Steel.
Unknown date	Lady Kinnaird	Barque	Brown & Simpson	Dundee	United Kingdom	For W. B. Ritchie.
Unknown date	Laffitte	Merchantman	Robert Thompson Jr.	Sunderland	United Kingdom	For S. Clarke & Co.
Unknown date	Leechmere	Merchantman	Short Bros.	Sunderland	United Kingdom	For J. S. Barwick.
Unknown date	Lena	Merchantman	Robert Thompson Jr.	Sunderland	United Kingdom	For Culliford & Clark.
Unknown date	Lennox	Barque	Dobie & Co	Govan	United Kingdom	For private owner.
Unknown date	Leo	Fishing trawler	Edwin Barter	Brixham	United Kingdom	For Thomas B. Edwards and others.
Unknown date	Liddesdale	Merchantman	James Laing	Sunderland	United Kingdom	For Milburn Bros.
Unknown date	Linden	Steamship	Short Bros	Sunderland	United Kingdom	For R. Thorman & Co.
Unknown date	Lizzie Bell	Barque	Robert Thompson Jr.	Sunderland	United Kingdom	For P. Iredale & Son.
Unknown date	Luce Bros.	Fishing trawler	Alberton & Douglas Machine Co.	New London, Connecticut	United States	For private owner.
Unknown date	Lutetia	Merchantman	Joseph L. Thompson	Sunderland	United Kingdom	For Bell & Symonds.
Unknown date	Masonic	Ketch	R. Aldous & Co.	Brightlingsea	United Kingdom	For William Dove and others.
Unknown date	Matchless	Lancashire nobby	Woodhouse	Overtonn	United Kingdom	For private owner.
Unknown date	Menai Straits	Merchantman	William Doxford & Sons	Sunderland	United Kingdom	For G. Griffiths.
Unknown date	Moel Eilian	Barque	William Doxford & Sons	Sunderland	United Kingdom	For Llandinorwig Shipping Co.
Unknown date	Mow Hill	Merchantman	Blumer & Co.	Sunderland	United Kingdom	For W. Price.
Unknown date	Mudlark	Steamship	Messrs. Aitken & Mansel	Whiteinch	United Kingdom	For Scott, Edwards & Co.
Unknown date	Nebo	Steamship	James Laing	Sunderland	United Kingdom	For D. G. Pinkney.
Unknown date	Nebraska	Fishing trawler	Edwin Barter	Brixham	United Kingdom	For William H. W. Bird.
Unknown date	Netley	Steamboat	W. Allsup & Sons	Preston	United Kingdom	For private owner.
Unknown date	Niagara	Steamship	John Roach & Sons	Chester, Pennsylvania	United States	For Ward Line.
Unknown date	Norman	Steamship	Robert Thompson Jr.	Sunderland	United Kingdom	For H. Clapham & Co.
Unknown date	Northern Belle	Steamship	Messrs. Raylton, Dixon & Co.	Middlesbrough	United Kingdom	For private owner.
Unknown date	Ocean	Yawl	Messrs. Raylton, Dixon & Co.	Middlesbrough	United Kingdom	For private owner.
Unknown date	Orduna	Merchantman	W. F. Pile	Sunderland	United Kingdom	For C. J. Briggs.
Unknown date	Overijssel	Steamship	Messrs. Raylton, Dixox & Co.	Middlesbrough	United Kingdom	For private owner.
Unknown date	Pallas	Merchantman	James Laing	Sunderland	United Kingdom	For Gerhard & Lubken.
Unknown date	Parthenon	Merchantman	Bartram, Haswell & Co.	Sunderland	United Kingdom	For Anderson & Moran.
Unknown date	Petrarch	Steamship	Messrs. John Readhead & Co.	South Shields	United Kingdom	For private owner.
Unknown date	Pingo	Steamship	Messrs. Aitken & Mansel	Whiteinch	United Kingdom	For Mr. Elsee.
Unknown date	Pioneer	Fishing trawler	Edwin Barter	Brixham	United Kingdom	For William J. Sanders and others.
Unknown date	Prinz Friedrich Carl	Merchantman	Short Bros	Sunderland	United Kingdom	For J. H. Lorentzen.
Unknown date	Prosperous	Ketch	Joseph Burton	Selby	United Kingdom	For H. Staines.
Unknown date	Provincia	Merchantman	Austin & Hunter	Sunderland	United Kingdom	For Cyprian Fabre & Co.
Unknown date	Prudent	Merchantman	Bartram, Haswell & Co.	Sunderland	United Kingdom	For James Westoll.
Unknown date	Queen of the Mersey	Paddle steamer	Thomas Brassey & Co.	Birkenhead	United Kingdom	For The Rock Ferry Co. Ltd.
Unknown date	Quickstep	Steamboat		Astoria, Oregon	United States	For private owner.
Unknown date	Racilla	Merchantman	Bartram, Haswell & Co.	Sunderland	United Kingdom	For Stephens, Kendrick & Mawson.
Unknown date	Ranee	Steam yacht	Bewley, Webb & Co.	Dublin	United Kingdom	For J. F. Bewley.
Unknown date	Richard Holyoke	Tug	Hiram Doncaster and William McCurdy	Seabeck	(United States) Washington Territory	For private owner.
Unknown date	Rothesay Bay	Barque	Messrs. Birrell, Stenhouse & Co	Dumbarton	United Kingdom	For private owner.
Unknown date	Scottish Fairy	Merchantman	Austin & Hunter	Sunderland	United Kingdom	For W. Milnes.
Unknown date	Snowdonia	Merchantman	Mounsey & Foster	Sunderland	United Kingdom	For Arvon Shipping Co.
Unknown date	St. Mildred	Merchantman	Messrs. Richardson, Duck & Co.	South Stockton	United Kingdom	For private owner.
Unknown date	Success	Paddle steamer			Victoria	For Westwood & Air.
Unknown date	Tarantella	Catamaran	Nathaniel Greene Herreshoff	Providence, Rhode Island	United Kingdom	For Nathaniel Greene Herreshoff.
Unknown date	Tikoma	Barque	John & Thomas Jardine	Richibucto	Canada	For John & Thomas Jardine.
Unknown date	Vampire	Steamship	Henry Murray & Co.	Port Glasgow	United Kingdom	For private owner.
Unknown date	Vectis	Collier	James Laing	Sunderland	United Kingdom	For W. Hill & Co.
Unknown date	Veliky Knyaz Konstantin	Torpedo boat tender			Russia	For Imperial Russian Navy.
Unknown date	Vigsnaes	Steamship	Messrs. Raylton, Dixon & Co.	Middlesbrough	United Kingdom	For private owner.
Unknown date	Westbourne	Merchantman	Robert Thompson Jr.	Sunderland	United Kingdom	For D. P. & W. P. Garbutt.
Unknown date	Wide West	Sternwheeler	John J. Holland	Portland, Oregon	United States	For Oregon Steam Navigation Company.
