= Kongō-class ironclad =

Imperial Japanese Navy's Kongō-class ironclads

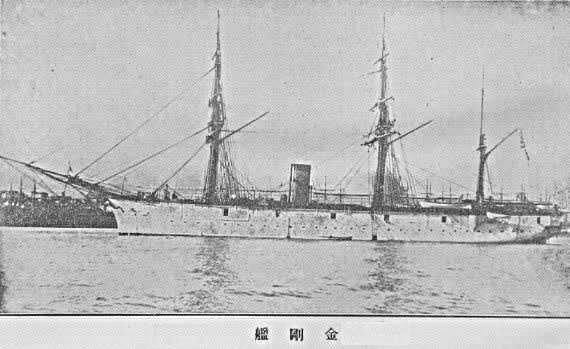
- Kongō at anchor

Class overview
- Builders: Earle's Shipbuilding & Eng.; Milford Haven Shipbuilding & Eng.
- Operators: Imperial Japanese Navy
- Preceded by: Fusō
- Succeeded by: Chiyoda; Fuji class
- Built: 1875–1877
- In commission: 1877–1911
- Planned: 2
- Completed: 2
- Scrapped: 2

General characteristics (as built)
- Type: Armored corvette
- Displacement: 2,248 long tons (2,284 t)
- Length: 220 ft (67.1 m)
- Beam: 41 ft (12.5 m)
- Draft: 19 ft (5.8 m)
- Installed power: 2,450 ihp (1,830 kW); 6 cylindrical boilers
- Propulsion: 1 shaft, 1 Horizontal return connecting rod-steam engine
- Sail plan: Barque rigged
- Speed: 13 knots (24 km/h; 15 mph)
- Range: 3,100 nmi (5,700 km; 3,600 mi) at 10 knots (19 km/h; 12 mph)
- Complement: 234
- Armament: 3 × 170 mm (6.7 in) Krupp guns; 6 × 150 mm (5.9 in) Krupp guns; 2 × short 75 mm (3.0 in) guns
- Armor: Belt: 3–4.5 in (76–114 mm)

The Kongō-class ironclads (金剛型) were a pair of armored corvettes built for the Imperial Japanese Navy (IJN) by British shipyards in the 1870s. A British offer to purchase the two ships during the Russo-Turkish War in 1878 was refused. They became training ships in 1887 and made training cruises to the Mediterranean and to countries on the edge of the Pacific Ocean. The ships returned to active duty during the First Sino-Japanese War of 1894–95 where one participated in the Battle of the Yalu River and both in the Battle of Weihaiwei. The Kongō-class ships resumed their training duties after the war, although they played a minor role in the Russo-Japanese War of 1904–05. They were reclassified as survey ships in 1906 and were sold for scrap in 1910 and 1912.

== Background ==
Tensions between Japan and China heightened after the former launched its punitive expedition against Taiwan in May 1874 in retaliation of the murder of a number of shipwrecked sailors by the Paiwan aborigines. China inquired into the possibility of buying ironclad warships from Great Britain and Japan was already negotiating with the Brazilian government about the purchase of the ironclad Independencia then under construction in Britain. The Japanese terminated the negotiations with the Brazilians in October after the ship was badly damaged upon launching and the expeditionary force was about to withdraw from Taiwan. The crisis illustrated the need to reinforce the IJN and a budget request was submitted that same month by Acting Navy Minister Kawamura Sumiyoshi for ¥3.9–4.2 million to purchase three warships from abroad. No Japanese shipyard was able to build ships of this size so they were ordered from Great Britain. This was rejected as too expensive and a revised request of ¥2.3 million was approved later that month. Nothing was done until March 1875 when Kawamura proposed to buy one ironclad for half of the money authorized and use the rest for shipbuilding and gun production at the Yokosuka Shipyard. No response was made by the Prime Minister's office before the proposal was revised to use all of the allocated money to buy three ships, one armored frigate and two armored corvettes of composite construction to be designed by the prominent British naval architect Sir Edward Reed, formerly the Chief Constructor of the Royal Navy. Reed would also supervise the construction of the ships for an honorarium of five percent of the construction cost. The Prime Minister's office approved the revised proposal on 2 May and notified the Japanese consul, Ueno Kagenori, that navy officers would be visiting to negotiate the contract with Reed.

Commander Matsumura Junzō arrived in London on 21 July and gave Reed the specifications for the ships. Reed responded on 3 September with an offer, excluding armament, that exceeded the amount allocated in the budget. Ueno signed the contracts for all three ships on 24 September despite this problem because Reed was scheduled to depart for a trip to Russia and the matter had to be concluded before his departure. Ueno had informed the Navy Ministry about the costs before signing, but Kawamura's response to postpone the order for the armored frigate did not arrive until 8 October. The totals for all three contracts came to £433,850 or ¥2,231,563 and did not include the armament. These were ordered from Krupp with a 50 percent down payment of £24,978. The government struggled to provide the necessary money even though the additional expenses had been approved by the Prime Minister's office on 5 June 1876, especially as more money was necessary to fully equip the ships for sea and to provision them for the delivery voyage to Japan.

== Description ==
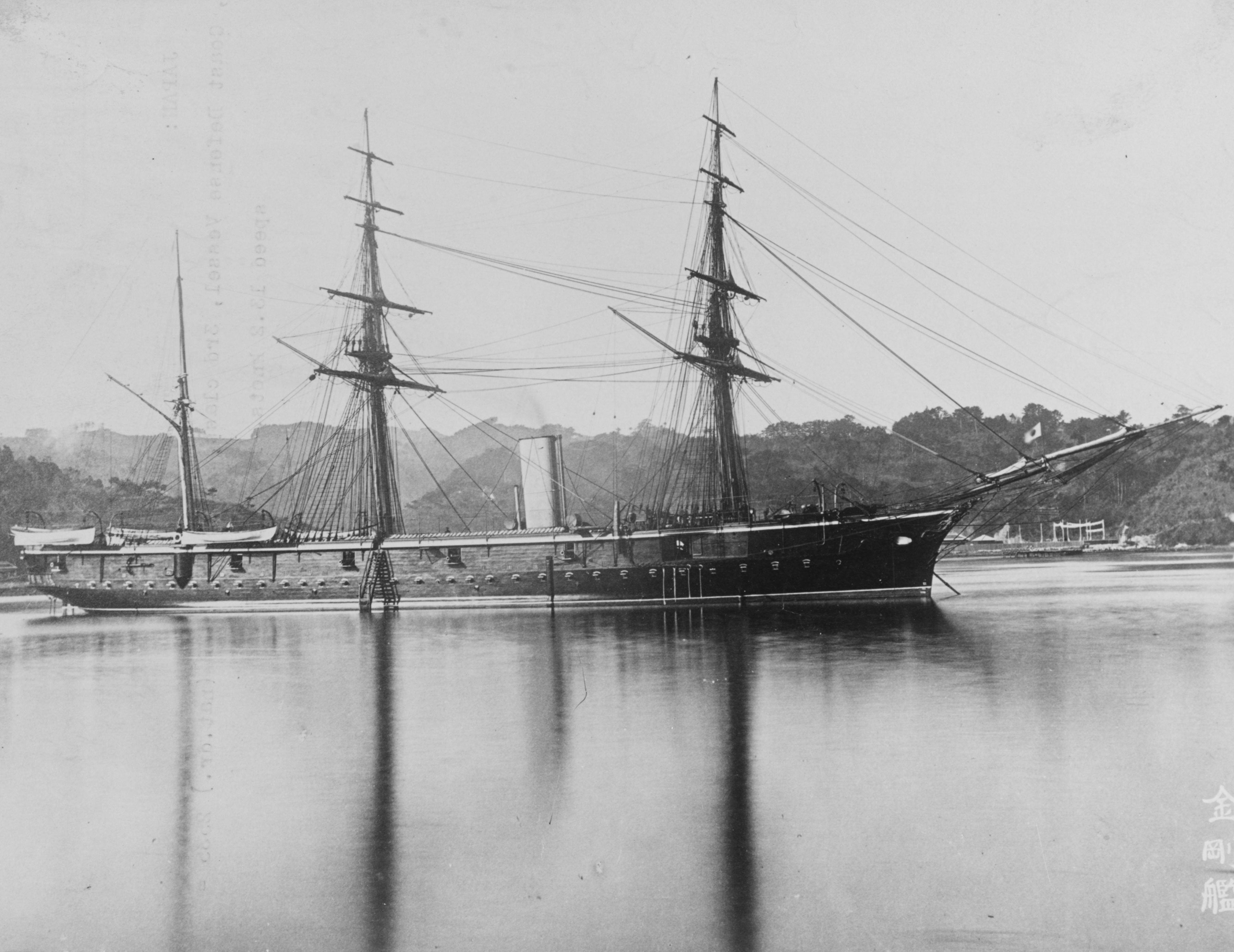
Another view of Kongō at anchor

The Kongō class was 220 feet (67.1 m) long between perpendiculars and had a beam of 41 feet (12.5 m). They had a forward draft of 18 feet (5.5 m) and drew 19 feet (5.8 m) aft. The ships displaced 2,248 long tons (2,284 t) and had a crew of 22 officers and 212 enlisted men. To reduce biofouling, their hulls were sheathed with copper.

=== Propulsion ===
The Kongō-class ships had a single two-cylinder double-expansion horizontal return connecting rod-steam engine made by Earle's Shipbuilding and Engineering, driving a single two-bladed 16-foot (4.9 m) propeller. Six cylindrical boilers provided steam to the engine at a working pressure of 4.22 bar (422 kPa; 61 psi). The engine was designed to produce 2,500 indicated horsepower (1,900 kW) to give the ships a speed of 13.5 knots (25.0 km/h; 15.5 mph). During sea trials, the ships reached maximum speeds of 13.75–13.92 knots (25.47–25.78 km/h; 15.82–16.02 mph). They carried a maximum of 345–390 long tons (351–396 t) of coal, enough to steam 3,100 nautical miles (5,700 km; 3,600 mi) at 10 knots (19 km/h; 12 mph).

The ironclads were barque-rigged and had a sail area of 14,036 square feet (1,304 m^{2}). To reduce wind resistance while under sail alone, the funnel was semi-retractable. Their topmasts were removed in 1895.

Both ships were reboilered at Yokosuka Naval Arsenal in 1889: Hiei received two steel double-ended cylindrical boilers while Kongō's new boilers were of the same type as her original ones. The new boilers proved to be less powerful for both ships during sea trials, Kongō reached a maximum speed of 12.46 knots (23.08 km/h; 14.34 mph) from 2,028 ihp (1,512 kW) while Hiei was significantly slower at 10.34 knots (19.15 km/h; 11.90 mph) from 1,279 ihp (954 kW).

=== Armament and armor ===
The ships were fitted with three 17-centimeter (6.7 in) RK L/25 Krupp rifled breech-loading (RBL) guns and six RBL 152-millimeter (6 in) Krupp guns. All of the 172-millimeter guns were positioned as chase guns, two forward and one aft. The forward chase guns were pivot-mounted and could traverse 122 degrees from straight ahead on their side of the ship. The aft gun could traverse a total of 125 degrees to each side. The 152-millimeter guns were mounted on the broadside. Each ship also carried two short 75-millimeter (3.0 in) guns for use ashore or mounted on the ships' boats.

The armor-piercing shell of the 172-millimeter gun weighed 132 pounds (59.9 kg). It had a muzzle velocity of about 1,500 ft/s (460 m/s) and was credited with the ability to penetrate 10.3 inches (262 mm) of wrought iron armor at the muzzle. Data for the 152-millimeter gun is not available.

During the 1880s, the armament of the Kongō-class ships was reinforced with the addition of four quadruple-barreled 25-millimeter (1.0 in) Nordenfelt and two quintuple-barreled 11-millimeter (0.4 in) Nordenfeldt machine guns for defense against torpedo boats. Around the same time the ships each also received two 356-millimeter (14.0 in) torpedo tubes for Schwartzkopff torpedoes. The tubes were mounted above the waterline and one torpedo was provided for each tube. Their anti-torpedo boat armament was again reinforced in 1897 by the addition of a pair of 2.5-pounder Hotchkiss guns. After the end of the Russo-Japanese War, their armament was reduced to six ex-Russian 12-pounder guns and six 2.5-pounders.

The Kongō-class corvettes had a wrought-iron waterline armor belt 4.5 inches (114 mm) thick amidships that tapered to 3 inches (76 mm) at the ends of the ship.

== Ships ==
Ship	Namesake	Builder	Laid down	Launched	Completed
Kongō	Mount Kongō	Earle's Shipbuilding & Engineering Company, Hull	24 September 1875?	17 April 1877	January 1878
Hiei	Mount Hiei	Milford Haven Shipbuilding & Engineering Co., Pembroke Dock	24 September 1875?	11 June 1877	February 1878

== Service ==
In February 1878, during the Russo-Turkish War, the British were not willing to accept the occupation of the Ottoman Turkish capital of Constantinople by Russian forces and began to prepare for war. The British government made informal inquiries about purchasing the two corvettes, but this was firmly rejected by the Japanese government. The ships sailed from Britain in February–March and arrived in Yokohama two months later. They were sailed to Japan by hired British crews as the IJN lacked the necessary experience. The ships were not formally turned over to the navy until 10 July when a formal ceremony was held in Yokohama attended by the Meiji Emperor and many senior government officials. The ships were opened for public tours after the ceremony.

Kongō hosted the Duke of Genoa when he visited Japan in late 1879. Hiei made port visits in China and in the Persian Gulf the following year. In 1885–86 both ships were assigned to the Small Standing Fleet. They became training ships in 1887 and they both made a training cruise to the Mediterranean in 1889–90 with cadets from the Imperial Japanese Naval Academy. Hiei and Kongō ferried the 69 survivors of the wrecked Ertuğrul back to Turkey where the ships' officers were received by Sultan Abdul Hamid II. The ships also carried a class of naval cadets. Until the end of the century, one or the other of the Kongō-class ships made the annual cadet cruise, usually to countries bordering the Pacific Ocean. Kongō was in Honolulu on one of these cruises during the Hawaiian Revolution of 1893, although the ship played no part in the affair. She returned to Hawaii the next year and briefly became the patrol ship there until the start of the First Sino-Japanese War later in 1894. Kongō did not participate in the Battle of the Yalu River, but Hiei was there. She was heavily engaged by Chinese ships and was damaged enough that she was forced to break off the action. Hiei was repaired after the battle and both ships were present during the Battle of Weihaiwei in early 1895, although neither saw any significant combat.

The Kongō-class ships were redesignated as 3rd-class coast defense ships in 1898 although they continued their training duties. They played a minor role in the Russo-Japanese War before they were reclassified as survey ships in 1906. Kongō was stricken from the Navy List in 1909 and sold the next year for scrap. Hiei was struck from the Navy List two years after her sister ship and was sold before 25 March 1912.

== See also ==
- List of ironclads
