= Japanese ironclad Kongō =

Kongō-class ironclad corvette

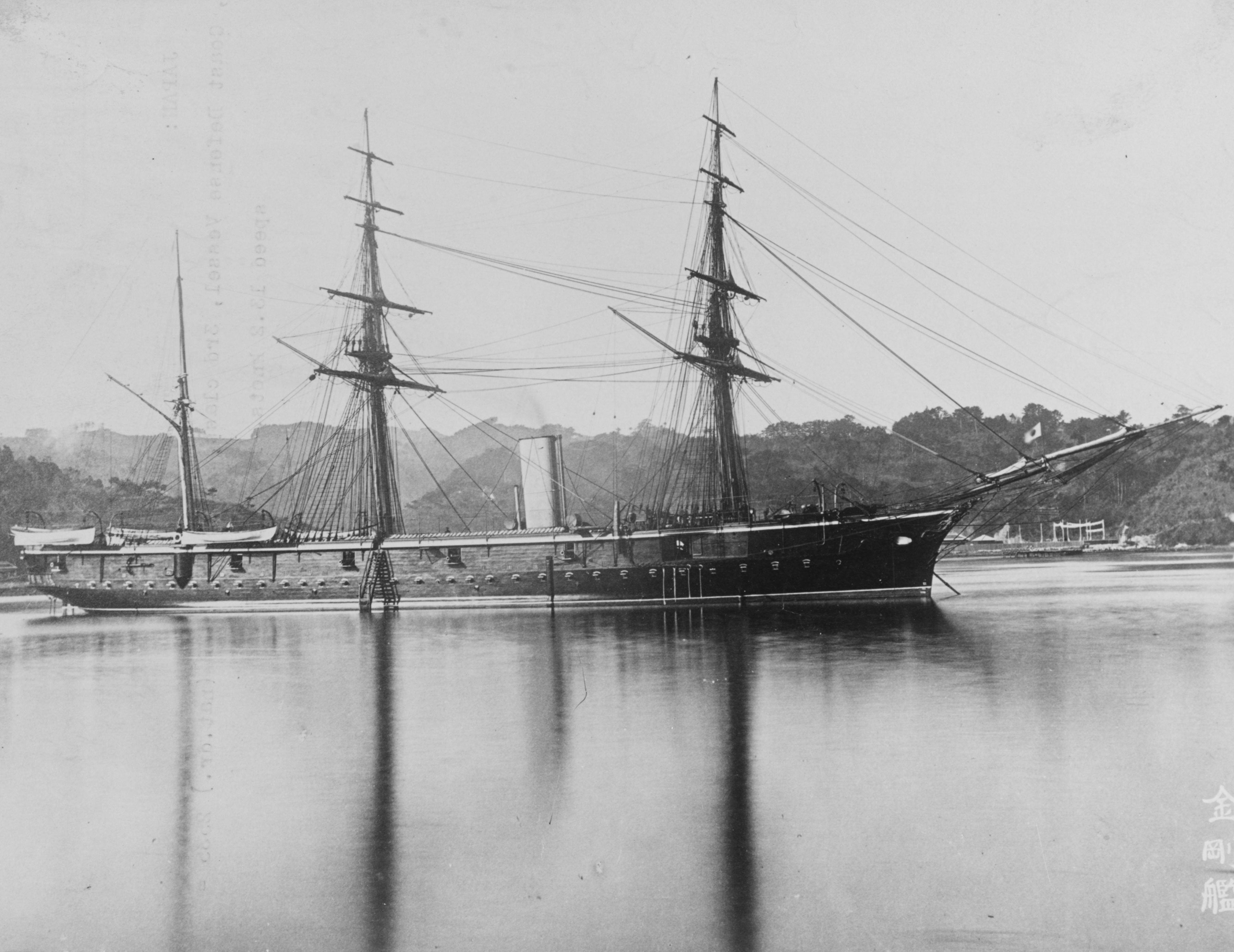
- Kongō at anchor

History

Empire of Japan
- Name: Kongō
- Namesake: Mount Kongō
- Ordered: 24 September 1875
- Builder: Earle's Shipbuilding & Engineering Co.
- Laid down: 24 September 1875?
- Launched: 17 April 1877
- Completed: January 1878
- Reclassified: 1887 as training ship; 21 March 1898 as 3rd-class coast defense ship; 1906 as survey ship
- Stricken: 20 July 1909
- Fate: Sold for scrap, 20 May 1910

General characteristics
- Class & type: Kongō-class ironclad corvette
- Displacement: 2,248 long tons (2,284 t)
- Length: 220 ft (67.1 m)
- Beam: 41 ft (12.5 m)
- Draft: 19 ft (5.8 m)
- Installed power: 6 cylindrical boilers; 2,450 ihp (1,830 kW)
- Propulsion: 1 shaft, 1 HRCR steam engine
- Sail plan: Barque rigged
- Speed: 13 knots (24 km/h; 15 mph)
- Range: 3,100 nmi (5,700 km; 3,600 mi) at 10 knots (19 km/h; 12 mph)
- Complement: 234
- Armament: 3 × 172 mm (6.8 in) Krupp guns; 6 × 152 mm (6 in) Krupp guns; 2 × short 75 mm (3 in) guns
- Armor: Belt: 3–4.5 in (76–114 mm)

Kongō (金剛, Kongō) was the lead ship of the Kongō-class ironclad corvettes built for the Imperial Japanese Navy (IJN) in the 1870s. The class was built in the United Kingdom because such ships could not yet be constructed in Japan. Completed in 1878, Kongō briefly served with the Small Standing Fleet before becoming a training ship in 1887, thereafter making training cruises to the Mediterranean and to countries on the edge of the Pacific Ocean. The ship returned to active duty during the First Sino-Japanese War of 1894–95 where she participated in the Battle of Weihaiwei. Kongō resumed her training duties after the war, though she also played a minor role in the Russo-Japanese War of 1904–05. The ship was reclassified as a survey ship in 1906 and was sold for scrap in 1910.

== Design and description ==
During the brief Japanese occupation of Taiwan in 1874, tensions heightened between China and Japan, and the possibility of war impressed on the Japanese government the need to reinforce its navy. The following year the government placed an order for the armored frigate Fusō and the Kongō-class corvettes Kongō and Hiei—with British shipyards as no Japanese shipyard was able to build ships of this size at the time. All three ships were designed by British naval architect Sir Edward Reed,

The contract for Kongō was awarded to Earle's Shipbuilding and Engineering Co. in Hull, England, on 24 September 1875 for the price of £120,750, exclusive of armament. The vessel was named for Mount Kongō.

Kongō was 220 feet (67.1 m) long between perpendiculars and had a beam of 41 feet (12.5 m). She had a forward draft of 18 feet (5.5 m) and drew 19 feet (5.8 m) aft. The ship displaced 2,248 long tons (2,284 t) and had a crew of 22 officers and 212 enlisted men. Her hull was of composite construction with an iron framework planked with wood.

=== Propulsion ===
Kongō had a single two-cylinder double-expansion horizontal-return connecting-rod steam engine, driving a single propeller using steam from six cylindrical boilers. The engine was designed to produce 2,500 indicated horsepower (1,900 kW) to give the Kongō-class ironclads a speed of 13.5 knots (25.0 km/h; 15.5 mph). During her sea trials on 7 December 1877, the ship reached a maximum speed of 13.73 knots (25.43 km/h; 15.80 mph) from 2,450 ihp (1,830 kW), enough to earn the builder a bonus of £300. She carried enough coal to steam 3,100 nautical miles (5,700 km; 3,600 mi) at 10 knots (19 km/h; 12 mph). The ironclad was barque-rigged and had a sail area of 14,036 square feet (1,304 m^{2}). The ship was reboilered at Yokosuka Naval Arsenal in 1889; the new boilers proved to be less powerful during sea trials, with Kongō reaching a maximum speed of 12.46 knots (23.08 km/h; 14.34 mph) from 2,028 ihp (1,512 kW). Her topmasts were removed in 1895.

=== Armament and armor ===
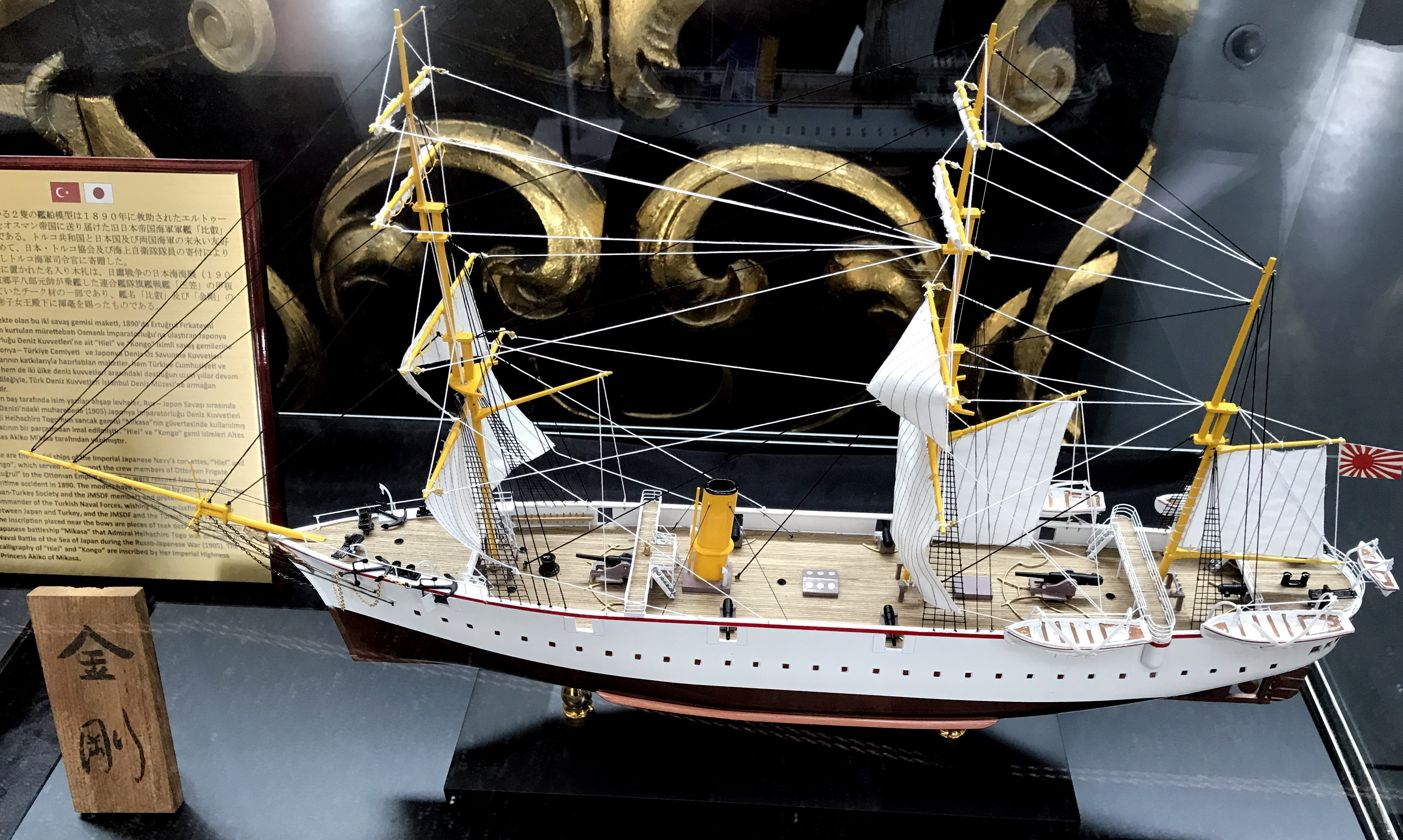
A scale model of Kongō on display at the Istanbul Naval Museum

Kongō was fitted with three Krupp 172-millimeter (6.8 in) rifled breech-loading (RBL) guns and six RBL 152-millimeter (6 in) Krupp guns. All of the 172-millimeter guns were positioned as chase guns, two forward and one aft. The 152-millimeter guns were mounted on the broadside. The ship also carried two short 75-millimeter (3 in) guns for use ashore or mounted on the ships' boats.

During the 1880s, the armament of the ship was reinforced with the addition of four quadruple-barreled 25-millimeter (1 in) Nordenfelt and two quintuple-barreled 11-millimeter (0.4 in) Nordenfelt machine guns for defense against torpedo boats. Around the same time she also received two 356-millimeter (14 in) torpedo tubes for Schwartzkopff torpedoes. The anti-torpedo boat armament was again reinforced in 1897 by the addition of a pair of 2.5-pounder Hotchkiss guns. After the end of the Russo-Japanese War, Kongō's armament was reduced to six ex-Russian 12-pounder guns and six 2.5-pounders.

The Kongō-class corvettes had a wrought-iron armor waterline belt 4.5 inches (114 mm) thick amidships that tapered to 3 inches (76 mm) at the ends of the ship.

== History ==
Japanese sources universally give the date for the keel-laying of both Kongō and her sister ship Hiei as 24 September 1875—the same as that for the awarding of the contract—but historian Hans Langerer describes this as improbable, arguing that no shipyard would order enough material to begin construction without cash in hand. Kongō was launched on 17 April 1877; the wife of a secretary in the Japanese Legation cut the retaining rope with a hammer and chisel. Completed in January 1878, Kongō sailed for Japan on 18 February under the command of a British captain and with a British crew because the IJN was not yet ready for such a long voyage. She arrived in Yokohama on 26 April and was classified as a Third Class Warship on 4 May. On 10 July a formal ceremony was held in Yokohama for the receipt of the ship that was attended by the Meiji Emperor and many senior government officials. The ship was opened for tours by the nobility, their families and invited guests for three days after the ceremony. On 14 July, the general public was allowed to tour the ship for a week.

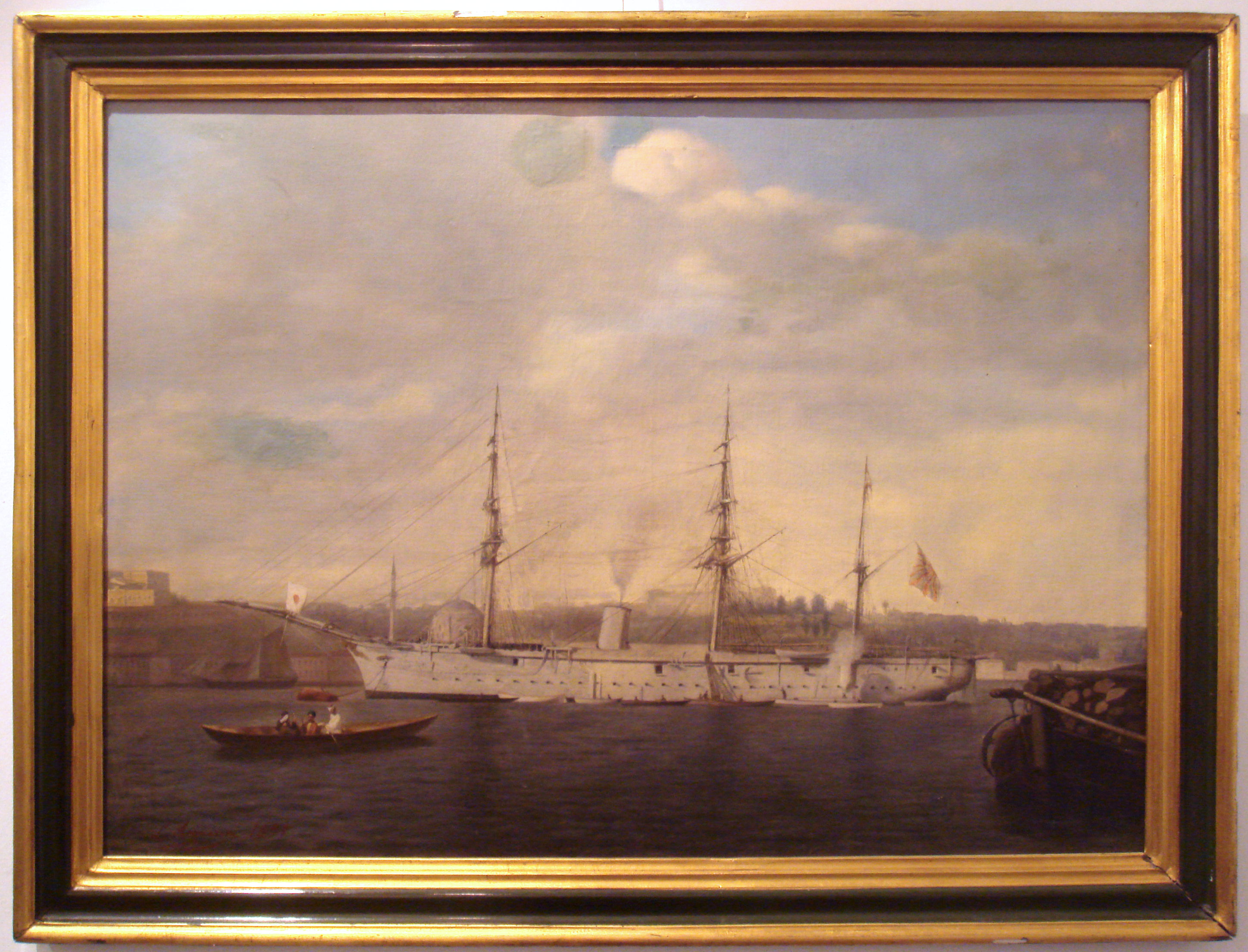
The Japanese Cruiser Kongō in Constantinople, 1891, by Luigi Acquarone (1800–1896).

Kongō hosted the Duke of Genoa when he visited Japan in late 1879. The ship was assigned to the Small Standing Fleet in 1885 and made port visits to Port Arthur and Chefoo in China and Jinsen in Korea the following year. She became a training ship in 1887 for the Kure Naval District. Together with her sister ship Hiei, Kongō sailed from Shinagawa, Tokyo on 13 August 1889 on a training cruise to the Mediterranean with cadets from the Imperial Japanese Naval Academy, returning on 2 February 1890. On 5 October, the sister ships departed Shinagawa for Kobe to pick up the 69 survivors of the wrecked Ottoman frigate Ertuğrul, transporting them to their homeland at Istanbul, Turkey, on 2 January 1891, after which the ships' officers were received by Sultan Abdul Hamid II. The ships also carried a class of naval cadets on this mission. On the return voyage, the two corvettes made port at Piraeus where they were visited by King George I of Greece and his son, Crown Prince Constantine. Making stops at Alexandria, Port Said, Aden, Colombo, Singapore and Hong Kong, the sister ships arrived at Shinagawa on 10 May where Kongō resumed her training duties.

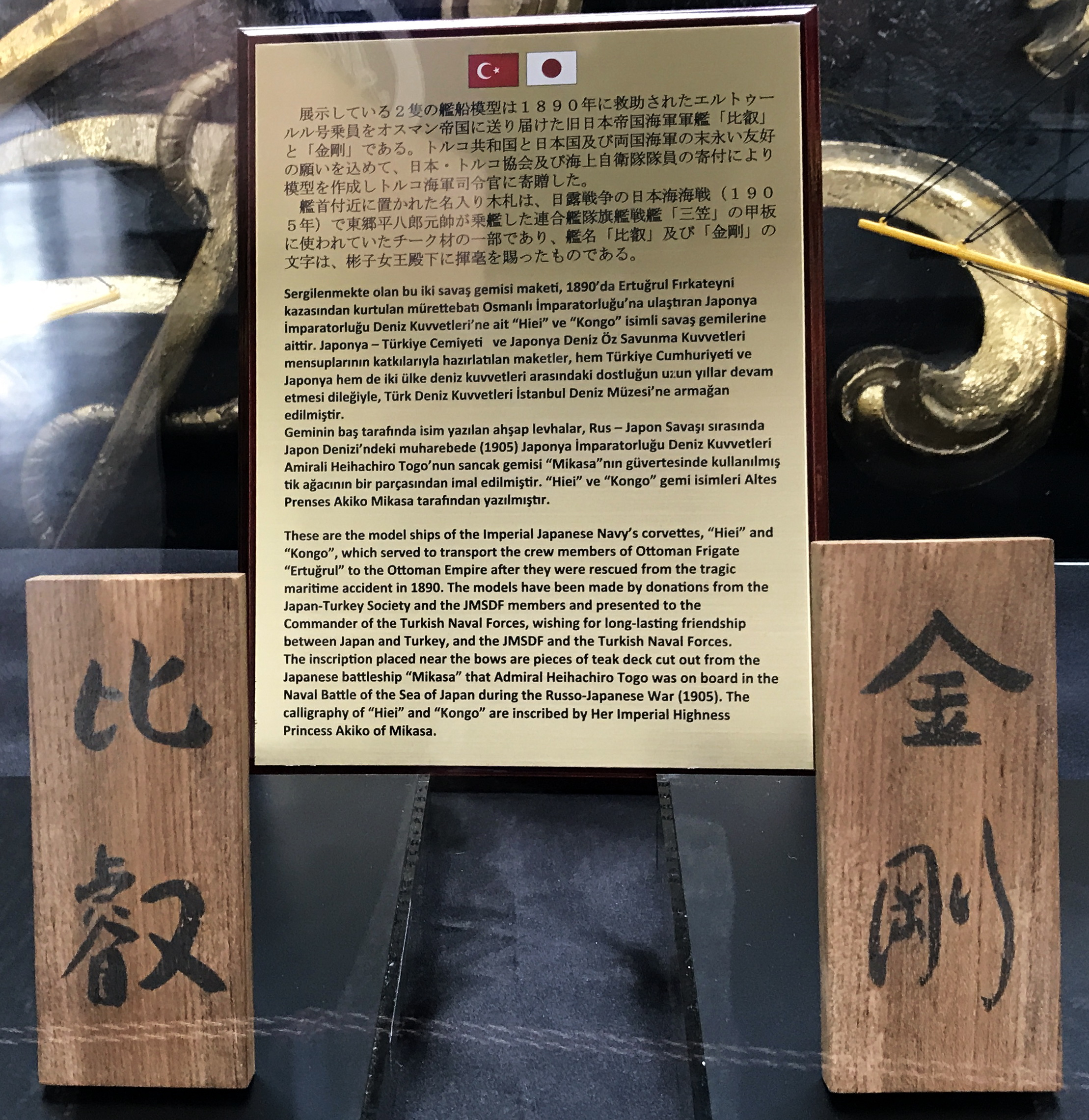
A template on display at Istanbul Naval Museum beside Kongō and Hiei models, memorizing Ottoman frigate Ertuğrul that sank in Japan in 1890 following a typhoon off the coast of Wakayama Prefecture.

Kongō began another cadet cruise on 24 September 1892 and visited Vancouver and San Francisco. On her return voyage she stopped at Honolulu and was present during the Hawaiian Revolution of 1893. Though playing no part in the affair, she remained there to protect Japanese interests until relieved by the cruiser Naniwa and reached home on 22 April. Kongō began another cadet cruise on 19 April 1894, but on arrival at Honolulu, transferred her cadets to the cruiser Takachiho on 16 June and relieved Takachiho as the patrol ship. Kongō's tenure there was brief as she was recalled home on 5 July due to rising tensions ahead of the First Sino-Japanese War. She did not participate in the Battle of the Yalu River in September, but was present during the Battle of Weihaiwei in January–February 1895.

After the war, Kongō and Hiei alternated annual cadet training cruises, with Kongō making the 1896 cruise to China and Southeast Asia from 11 April to 16 September. The Kongō's stop in Manila during that cruise coincided with the start of an uprising against Spanish rule in the Philippines. The captain of the ship was approached by the leaders of the rebellion in an attempt to buy arms from Japan, but ultimately no deal was made.

In 1898 the Kongō cruised to Australia from 17 March to 16 September. During this cruise, on 21 March 1898, she was re-designated as a 3rd-class coast defense ship, although she retained her training duties. Kongō made the 1900 cruise to Manila, Hong Kong and Australia from 21 February to 30 July and both ships made the 1902 cruise, their last, to Manila and Australia from 19 February to 25 August. Kongō played a minor role in the Russo-Japanese War before being reclassified as a survey ship in 1906. She was stricken from the Navy List on 20 July 1909 and sold on 20 May 1910 for scrap.
