= PS Earl of Ulster =

History
- Name: 1878–1895: P.S. Earl of Ulster
- Owner: 1878–1894: Lancashire and Yorkshire Railway
- Operator: 1878–1894: Lancashire and Yorkshire Railway
- Port of registry: (United Kingdom)
- Route: 1878–1894: Belfast – Fleetwood
- Builder: Barrow-in-Furness
- Launched: 24 November 1878
- Fate: Broken up December 1895

General characteristics
- Tonnage: 1,107 gross register tons (GRT)

PS Earl of Ulster was a paddle steamer passenger vessel operated by the London and North Western Railway and the Lancashire and Yorkshire Railway from 1878 to 1894.

== History ==
Earl of Ulster was built by the Barrow Iron Shipbuilding Co., Barrow in Furness, Lancashire for the North Lancashire Steam Navigation Co. She was launched on 24 November 1877. She operated on services from Fleetwood to Belfast.

On 30 June 1883, she was involved in a collision off the Isle of Man with the schooner Susanna.

On 12 March 1889, she collided with the Holywood Lighthouse in Belfast Lough and destroyed it.

After being sold to A M Carlisle in 1894, Earl of Ulster passed into the ownership of J McCausland of Portaferry and was briefly put into service on Strangford Lough running excursion trips for one season before being broken up.
