= Tikoma =

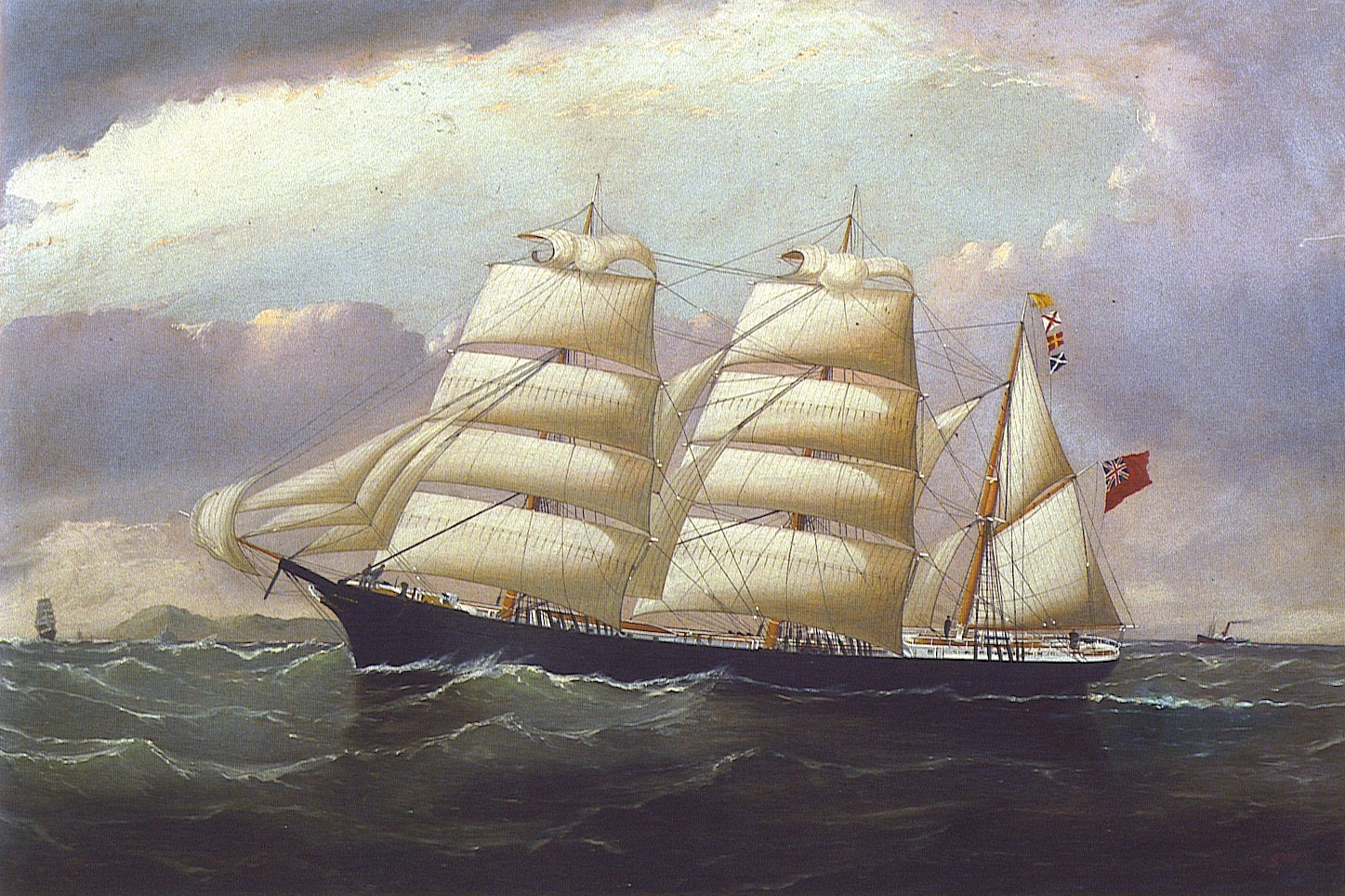
- center "Tikoma" by William Howard Yorke (1847-1921).

General characteristics
- Type: Wooden Barque
- Displacement: 731 tonnes
- Length: 166.2 ft
- Beam: 19.5 ft
- Height: 33.8 ft
- Propulsion: Sails
- Notes: Involved in trading timber and the transport of general supplies.

History

Canada
- Name: Tikoma
- Port of registry: Chatham, New Brunswick
- Builder: John and Thomas Jardine
- Launched: 1877
- Fate: 1889: Sold to O. C. Hansen, Sandefjord, Norway
- Notes: Official Number: 74405

Norway
- Name: Tikoma
- Fate: 1897: Sold to C. Apenes and Son, Fredrikstad, Norway; 1906: Sold to Th. Andresen, Fredrikstad, Norway; May 25th, 1909: Ran aground off Pictou, Nova Scotia and was lost.

The barque Tikoma was built in Richibucto, New Brunswick, Canada, by John and Thomas Jardine, nephews of the ship builder John Jardine. She was registered in 1877 in Chatham, New Brunswick and sold to O. C. Hansen (Sandefjord, Norway,) in 1889. Tikoma was sold to C. Apenes and Son of Fredrikstad, Norway in 1897, and sold once more to Th. Andresen (Fredrikstad, Norway) in 1906. She ran aground off Pictou, Nova Scotia, in 1909, and was lost.

== The Jardines ==
John Jardine is most notable for building the first square-rigged vessel in Kent County, New Brunswick (then, part of Northumberland County), in 1819. The ship was named the Ellen Douglas, and traded between Ricibucto and Scotland for many years. In 1824, John and Robert Jardine created the firm R. and J. Jardine, building seven vessels between the years 1824 and 1831. However, in 1831, the partnership dissolved, and John Jardine continued to work independently of Robert Jardine until 1844 when he decided to move to Liverpool, England.

Before John Jardine left for Liverpool, he had hired his nephews John and Thomas Jardine from where they had been working in Scotland. After their uncle had left in 1844, John and Thomas Jardine worked with Joseph Salter in Moncton for a time, built for their uncle under contract, and eventually established their own shipyard on the Richibucto River (J. & T. Jardine).

The Jardines’ first vessel was the ship Lochmaben Castle, launched in 1849, and their last vessel was the barque Valona, launched in 1884. Between these years, the Jardines built at least sixty vessels, including Tikoma.

== Ownership ==
Tikoma was built in Richibucto, New Brunswick and was registered in 1877 in the port of Chatham, New Brunswick, under the ownership of John and Thomas Jardine. In 1889, she was sold to O. C. Hansen in Sandefjord, Norway, and retained her name. In 1897, Tikoma was sold to C. Apenes and Son in Fredrikstad, Norway, but was not transferred until 1898. In 1906, she was sold to Th. Andresen, also from Fredrikstad, Norway.

== Wreck Location ==
On May 25, 1909, Tikoma was travelling from London, England to Pugwash, Nova Scotia in ballast when she ran aground off Pictou, Nova Scotia and was lost.
