= Japanese ironclad Hiei =

Imperial Japanese Navy's Kongō-class ironclad corvette

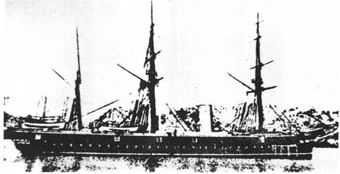
- Japanese armored corvette Hiei in 1877

History

Empire of Japan
- Name: Hiei
- Namesake: Mount Hiei
- Ordered: 24 September 1875
- Builder: Milford Haven Shipbuilding & Engineering Co., Pembroke Dock, Wales
- Laid down: 24 September 1875?
- Launched: 11 June 1877
- Completed: February 1878
- Reclassified: 1887 as training ship; 21 March 1898 as 3rd-class coast defense ship; 1906 as survey ship
- Stricken: 1 April 1911
- Fate: Sold for scrap, before 25 March 1912

General characteristics
- Class & type: Kongō-class ironclad corvette
- Displacement: 2,248 long tons (2,284 t)
- Length: 220 ft (67.1 m)
- Beam: 41 ft (12.5 m)
- Draft: 19 ft (5.8 m)
- Installed power: 2,450 ihp (1,830 kW); 6 cylindrical boilers
- Propulsion: 1 shaft, 1 Horizontal-return connecting-rod steam engine
- Sail plan: Barque rigged
- Speed: 13 knots (24 km/h; 15 mph)
- Range: 3,100 nmi (5,700 km; 3,600 mi) at 10 knots (19 km/h; 12 mph)
- Complement: 234
- Armament: 3 × 170 mm (6.7 in) Krupp guns; 6 × 150 mm (5.9 in) Krupp guns; 2 × short 75 mm (3.0 in) guns
- Armor: Belt: 3–4.5 in (76–114 mm)

Hiei (比叡, Hiei) was the second and last vessel of the Kongō-class ironclad corvettes built for the Imperial Japanese Navy (IJN) in the 1870s. They were built in the United Kingdom because the Japanese were unable to build ironclad warships in Japan at the time. She became a training ship in 1887 and made training cruises to the Mediterranean and to countries on the edge of the Pacific Ocean. The ship returned to active duty during the First Sino-Japanese War of 1894–1895 where she was damaged during the Battle of the Yalu River. Hiei also participated in the Battle of Weihaiwei and the invasion of Formosa in 1895. The ship resumed her training duties after the war, although she played a minor role in the Russo-Japanese War of 1904–1905. She was reclassified as a survey ship in 1906 and was sold for scrap in 1912.

== Design and description ==
During the brief Japanese occupation of Taiwan in 1874, tensions heightened between China and Japan, and the possibility of war caused the Japanese government to realize that it needed to reinforce its navy. The following year the government placed an order for the armored frigate Fusō and two Kongō-class ships, designed by the British naval architect Sir Edward Reed, from British shipyards as no Japanese shipyard was yet able to build a ship of this size.

Hiei was 220 feet (67.1 m) long between perpendiculars and had a beam of 41 feet (12.5 m). She had a forward draft of 18 feet (5.5 m) and drew 19 feet (5.8 m) aft. The ship displaced 2,248 long tons (2,284 t) and had a crew of 22 officers and 212 enlisted men. Her hull was of composite construction with an iron framework planked with wood.

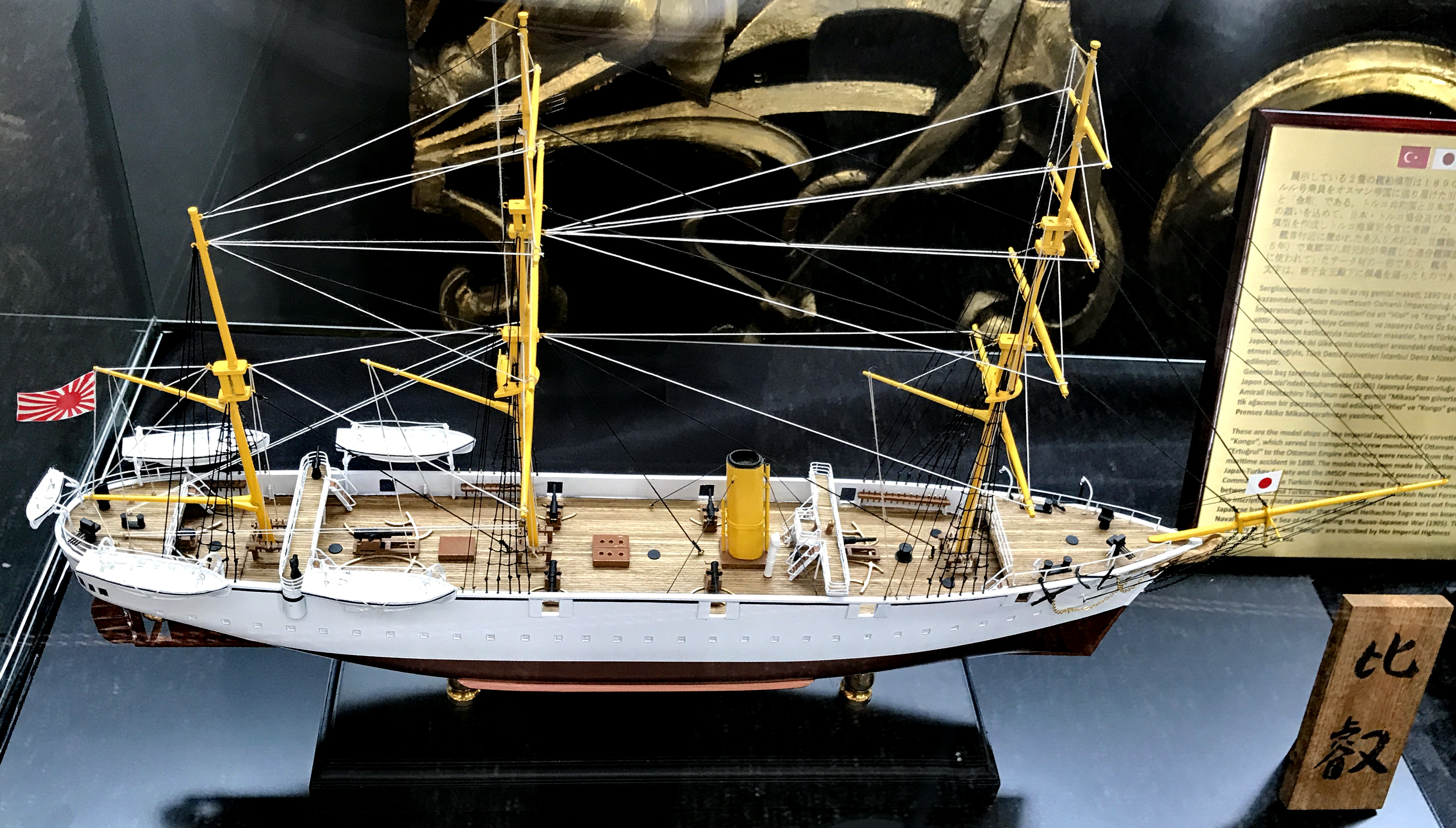
A scale model of Japanese ironclad Hiei corvette, on display at Istanbul Naval Museum.

=== Propulsion ===
The ship had a single two-cylinder, double-expansion, horizontal return connecting-rod steam engine, driving a single propeller using steam from six cylindrical boilers. The engine was designed to produce 2,500 indicated horsepower (1,900 kW) to give the Kongō-class ironclads a speed of 13.5 knots (25.0 km/h; 15.5 mph). During her sea trials on 7 December 1877, the ship reached a maximum speed of 13.92 knots (25.78 km/h; 16.02 mph). She carried enough coal to steam 3,100 nautical miles (5,700 km; 3,600 mi) at 10 knots (19 km/h; 12 mph). The ironclad was barque-rigged and had a sail area of 14,036 square feet (1,304 m^{2}). The ship was reboilered at Yokosuka Naval Arsenal in 1889 with two steel cylindrical boilers; the new boilers proved to be less powerful during sea trials. Hiei reached a maximum speed of 10.34 knots (19.15 km/h; 11.90 mph) from 1,279 ihp (954 kW). Her topmasts were removed in 1895.

=== Armament and armor ===
Hiei was fitted with three 172-millimeter (6.8 in) Krupp rifled breech-loading (RBL) guns and six RBL 152-millimeter (6.0 in) Krupp guns. All of the 172-millimeter guns were positioned as chase guns, two forward and one aft. The 152-millimeter guns were mounted on the broadside. The ship also carried two short 75-millimeter (3.0 in) guns for use ashore or mounted on the ship's boats.

During the 1880s, the armament of the ship was reinforced with the addition of four quadruple-barreled 25-millimeter (1.0 in) Nordenfelt and two quintuple-barreled 11-millimeter (0.4 in) Nordenfeldt machine guns for defense against torpedo boats. Around the same time she also received two 356-millimeter (14.0 in) torpedo tubes for Schwartzkopff torpedoes. The anti-torpedo boat armament was again reinforced in 1897 by the addition of a pair of 2.5-pounder Hotchkiss guns. After the end of the Russo-Japanese War, Hiei's armament was reduced to six ex-Russian 12-pounder guns and six 2.5-pounders.

The Kongō-class corvettes had a wrought-iron armor waterline belt 4.5 inches (114 mm) thick amidships that tapered to 3 inches (76 mm) at the ends of the ship.

== History ==
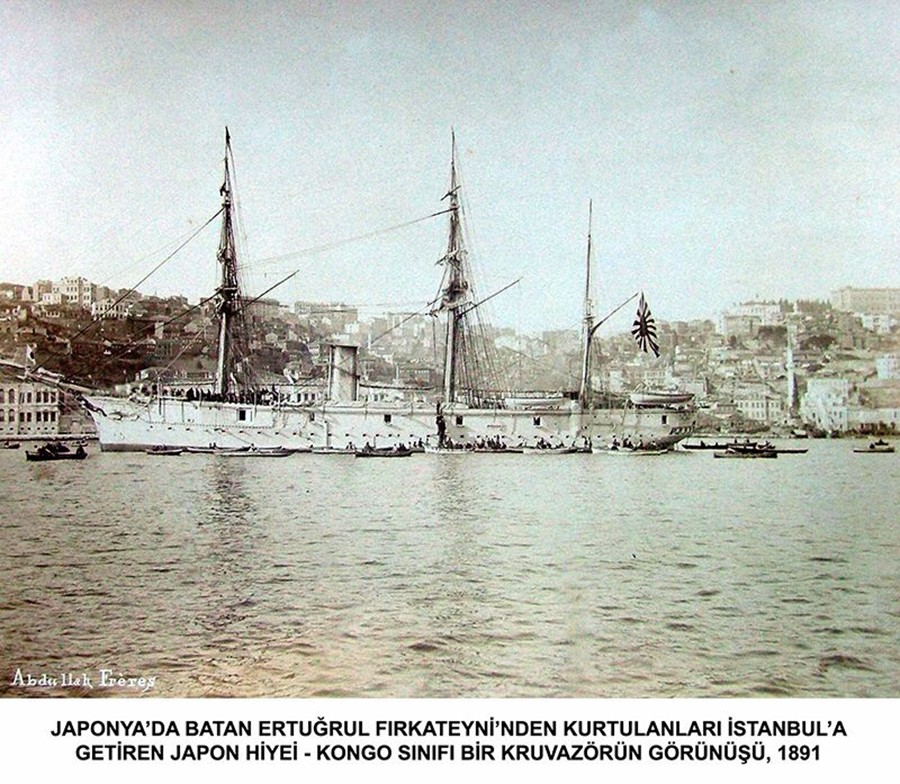
A view of the Japanese Hiei, a Kongō class corvette that brought the survivors of the frigate Ertuğrul that sank in Japan to Constantinople (now Istanbul), 1891.

The contract for Hiei was awarded to Milford Haven Shipbuilding and Engineering Co. in Pembroke Dock, Wales, on 24 September 1875 for the price of £119,600, exclusive of armament. Japanese sources universally give the date for Hiei's keel-laying as 24 September 1875—the same as that for the awarding of the contract—but historian Hans Langerer describes this as improbable, arguing that no shipyard would order enough material to begin construction without cash in hand. She was launched on 12 June 1877; Reed's daughter smashed a bottle of champagne on the ship's bow in the traditional Western style. The ship was named for Mount Hiei. Completed in February 1878, Hiei sailed for Japan on 22 March under the command of a British captain and with a British crew because the IJN was not yet ready for such a long voyage. One of the passengers aboard her was the future admiral Togo Heihachiro, who had just completed six years of study in the United Kingdom. She arrived in Yokohama on 22 May and was assigned to the Tokai Naval District a month later. On 10 July a formal ceremony was held in Yokohama for the receipt of the ship that was attended by the Meiji Emperor and many senior government officials. The ship was opened for tours by the nobility, their families and invited guests for three days after the ceremony. On 14 July, the general public was allowed to tour the ship for a week.

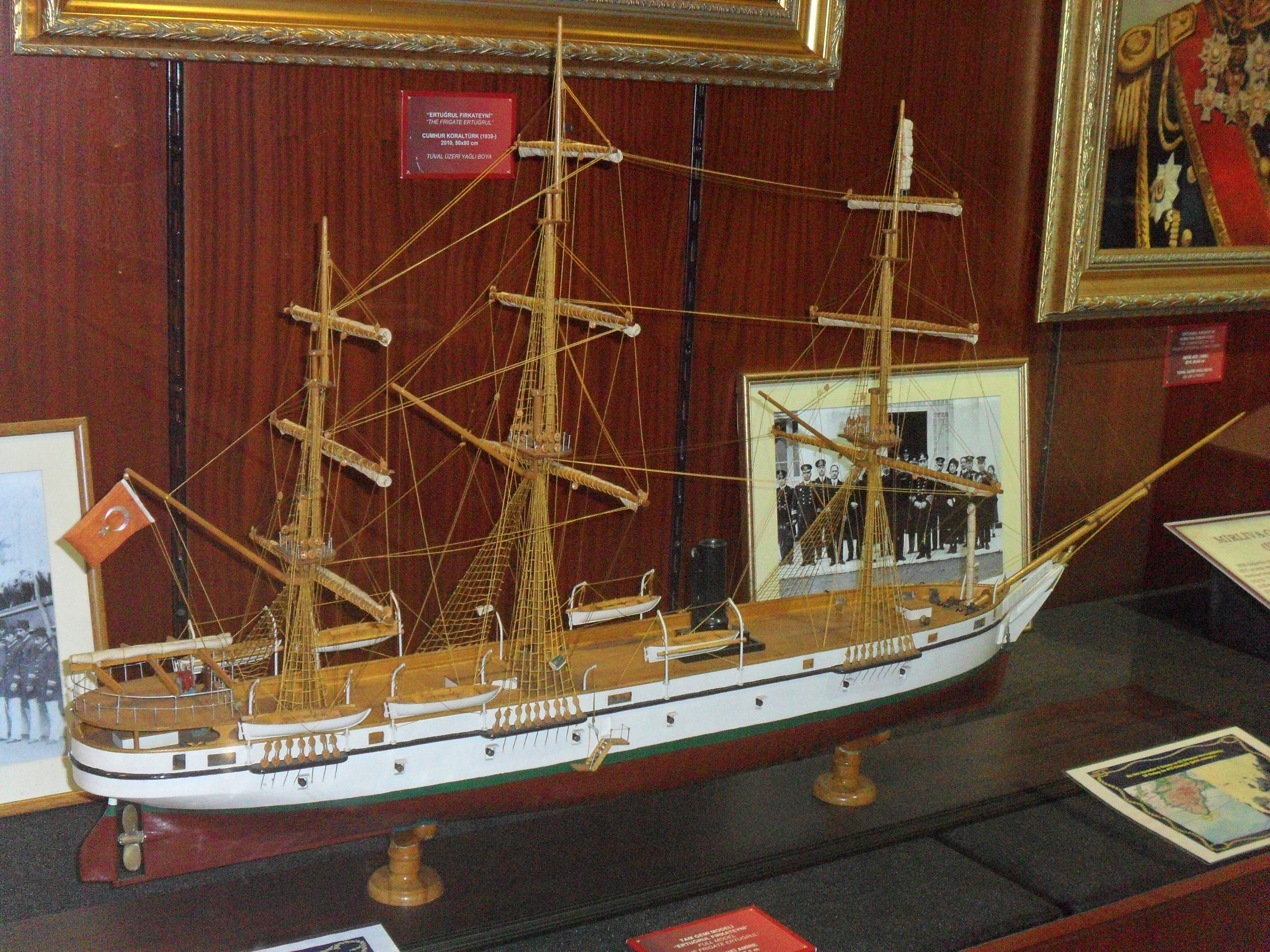
A scale model of Ertuğrul on display at the Mersin Naval Museum

During 1880, Hiei visited ports in India, Persia, the Persian Gulf and various ports in Southeast Asia. The ship made annual port visits to Jinsen in Korea in 1881 through 1883. She was assigned to the Small Standing Fleet in 1886 and became a training ship in 1887 the following year. Together with her sister ship Kongō, Hiei sailed from Shinagawa, Tokyo on 13 August 1889 on a training cruise to the Mediterranean with cadets from the Imperial Japanese Naval Academy, returning on 2 February 1890. On 5 October the sisters departed Shinagawa for Kobe to pick up the 69 survivors of the wrecked Ottoman frigate Ertuğrul and continued on to Istanbul, Turkey to return them to their homeland. They arrived on 2 January 1891, and the ships' officers were received by Sultan Abdul Hamid II. The ships also carried a class of naval cadets. On the return voyage, they made a port visit at Piraeus where they were visited by King George I of Greece and his son, Crown Prince Constantine. Making stops at Alexandria, Port Said, Aden, Colombo, Singapore and Hong Kong, the sisters arrived at Shinagawa on 10 May.

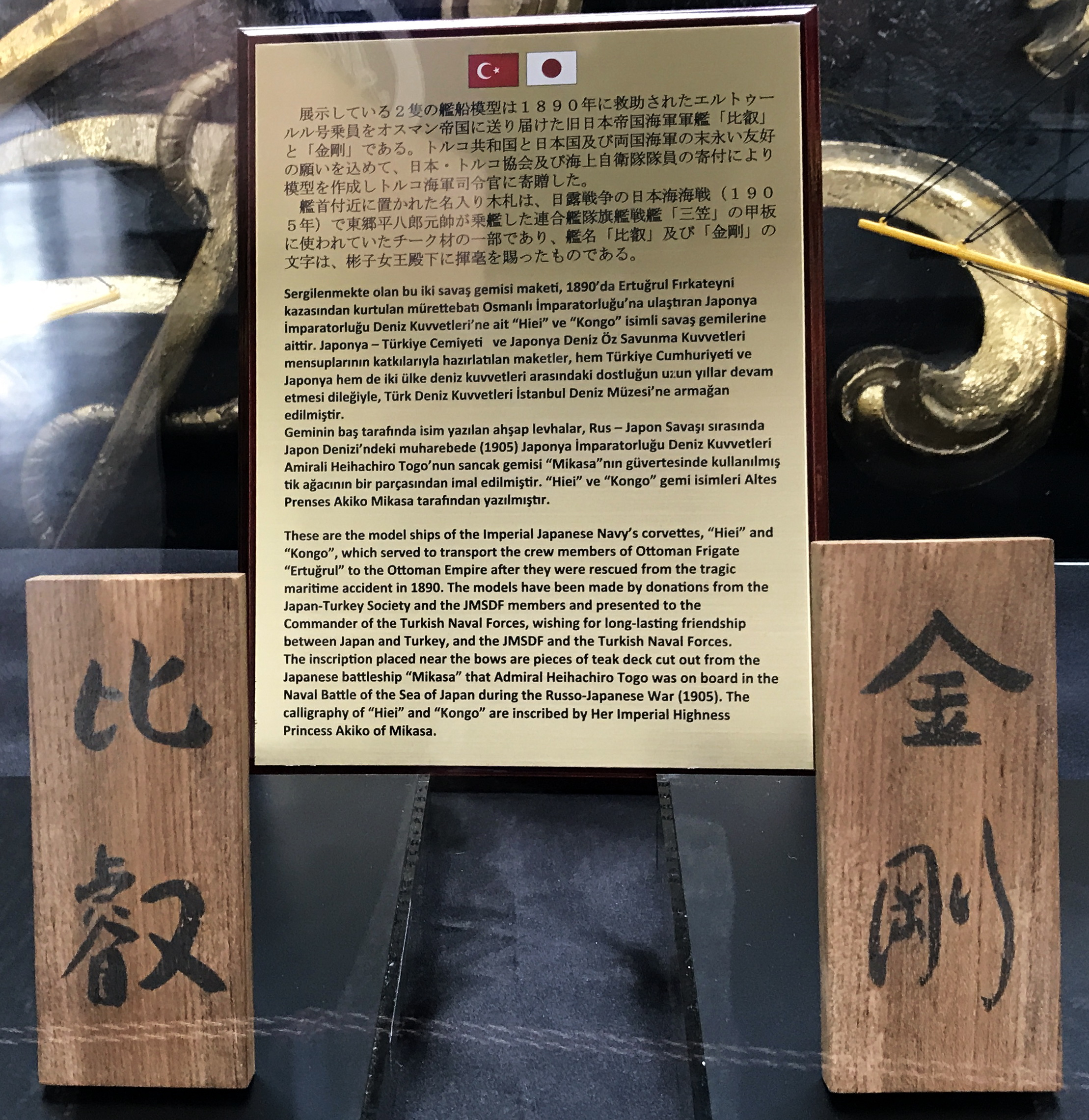
A template on display at Istanbul Naval Museum beside Kongō and Hiei models, memorizing Ottoman frigate Ertuğrul that sank in Japan following a typhoon off the coast of Wakayama Prefecture.

Hiei began another cadet cruise on 30 September 1891 and visited Australia and Manila before returning to Shinagawa on 10 April 1892. The ship was not in service in 1893, but she was recommissioned before the beginning of the First Sino-Japanese War in 1894. Hiei was assigned to the Standing Fleet on 2 July. She was the last ship in the Japanese line during the Battle of the Yalu River in September and was heavily damaged when her captain decided to pass through the Chinese fleet rather than try to keep up with the faster Main Squadron. The ship became the target of most of the Chinese ships and was forced to disengage to prevent further damage. Hiei was transferred to the West-Sea Fleet on 14 October, and the sisters were assigned to the Second Raiding Unit in December for operations against the Chinese port of Weihaiwei. The ships were present during the Battle of Weihaiwei in January–February 1895, although neither saw significant combat. Hiei took part in the invasion of Formosa in 1895, and participated in the bombardment of the Chinese coastal forts at Takow (Kaohsiung) on 13 October 1895.

After the war, Hiei alternated her training cruises with Kongō, making the 1897 cruise to the West Coast of North America and Hawaii from 13 April to 20 September and repeating the same cruise from 14 December 1898 to 28 August 1899. During that cruise, on 21 March 1898, the ship was re-designated as a 3rd-class coast defense ship, although she retained her training duties. Both sister ships made the 1902 cruise, their last, to Manila and Australia from 19 February to 25 August. Hiei played a minor role in the Russo-Japanese War before she was reclassified as a survey ship in 1906. Hiei was stricken from the Navy List on 1 April 1911 and ordered to be sold on 21 December. The exact date of her sale is not known, although Maizuru Naval District reported her sale on 25 March 1912.
