= Japanese corvette Yamato =

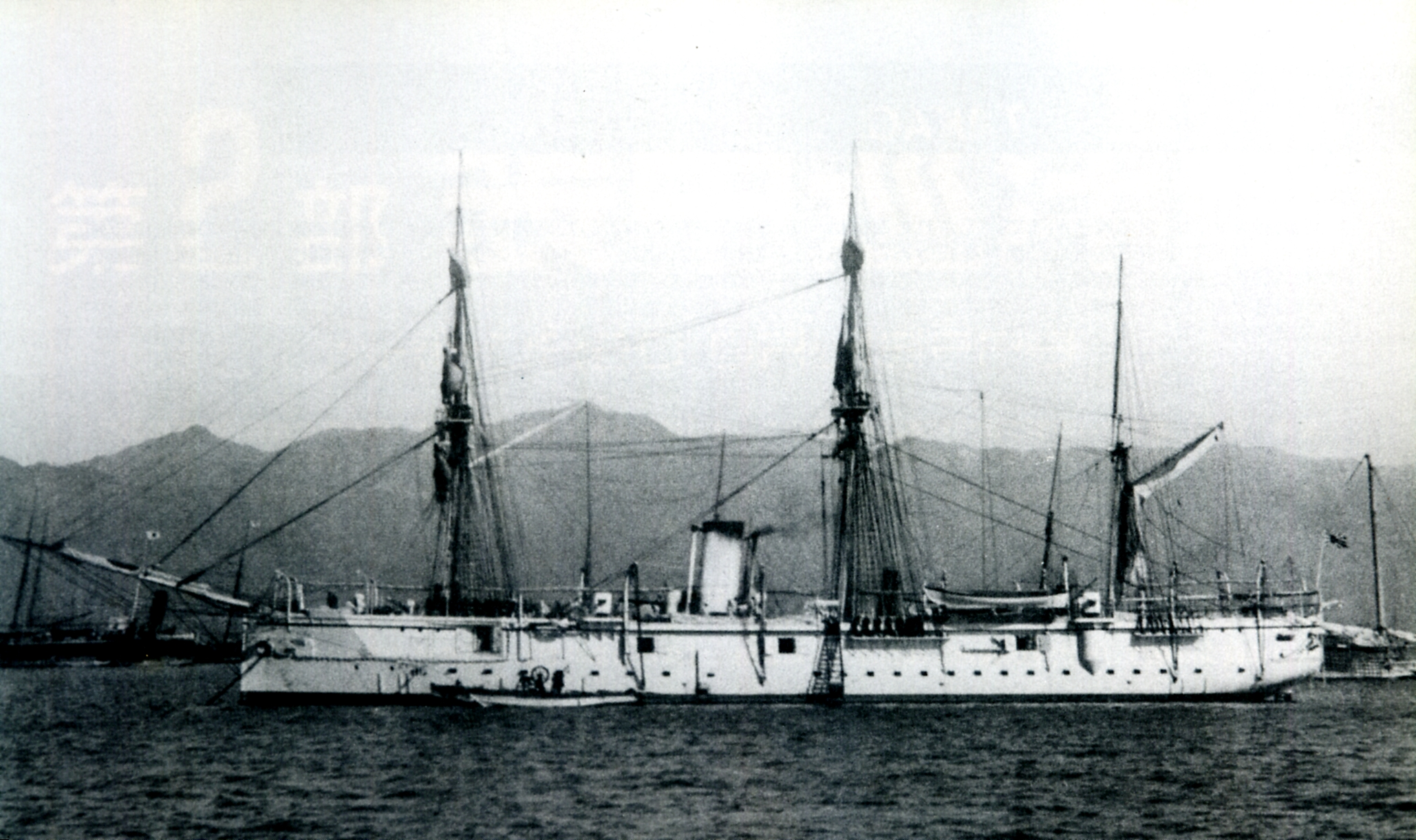
- Yamato at Kobe in 1889-1890

History

Empire of Japan
- Name: Yamato
- Namesake: Yamato province
- Ordered: 1882 Fiscal Year
- Builder: Onohama Shipyards, Japan
- Laid down: 23 November 1883
- Launched: 1 May 1885
- Commissioned: 16 November 1888
- Stricken: 1 April 1935
- Fate: Sunk in typhoon September 1945, Raised and scrapped 1950

General characteristics
- Class & type: Katsuragi-class corvette
- Displacement: 1,476 long tons (1,500 t)
- Length: 62.78 m (206 ft 0 in)
- Beam: 10.7 m (35 ft 1 in)
- Draft: 4.6 m (15 ft 1 in)
- Propulsion: Horizontally-mounted reciprocating engine, 1,622 hp (1,210 kW); 6 boilers, shaft
- Sail plan: Barque-rigged sloop
- Speed: 13 knots (15 mph; 24 km/h)
- Range: 145 tons coal
- Complement: 231
- Armament: 2 × 170 mm (6.7 in) Krupp breech-loading guns; 5 × 120 mm (4.7 in) guns; 1 × 80 mm (3.1 in) gun; 4 × quadruple 1-inch Nordenfelt guns; 2 × 380 mm (15 in) torpedo tubes

Yamato (大和, Yamato) was the second vessel in the Katsuragi class of three composite hulled, sail-and-steam corvettes of the early Imperial Japanese Navy. It was named for Yamato province, the old name for Nara prefecture and the historic heartland of Japan. The name was used again for the World War II battleship Yamato, commissioned in 1941.

== Background ==
Yamato was designed as an iron-ribbed, wooden-hulled, three-masted bark-rigged sloop-of-war with a coal-fired double-expansion reciprocating steam engine with six cylindrical boilers driving a single screw. Her basic design was based on experience gained in building the Kaimon and Tenryū sloops, but was already somewhat obsolescent in comparison to contemporary European warships when completed. However, unlike her sister ships Katsuragi and Musashi, which were built by the government-owned Yokosuka Naval Arsenal. Yamato was built by the Onohama Shipyards, in Kobe. Her first captain was future Fleet Admiral Tōgō Heihachirō.

== Operational history ==
Yamato saw combat service in the First Sino-Japanese War of 1894-1895, patrolling between Korea, Dairen and Weihaiwei. She was also at the Battle of Yalu River in a reserve capacity in the Western Sea Fleet.

On 21 March 1898, Yamato was designated as a third-class gunboat, and was used for coastal survey and patrol duties.

During the Russo-Japanese War, Yamato served as a guard ship patrolling the Kanmon Straits between Honshū and Kyūshū off of Shimonoseki. On 28 August 1912, she was reclassified as a second class coastal patrol vessel, and was assigned to coastal survey duties. On 1 April 1922, she was officially re-designated as a survey vessel, and her armament was replaced by two 8-inch guns. During the course of its surveys, Yamato discovered a seamount in the Sea of Japan, which was named after it.

On 1 April 1935, Yamato was retired from navy service and demilitarized. Her hulk was obtained by the Ministry of Justice and relocated to Uraga where she was used as a floating prison and training vessel for juvenile offenders. She was towed to Yokohama harbor during World War II, but was swamped in a typhoon in September 1945 at the mouth of the Tsurumi River in Tokyo Bay. Her hulk was raised and scrapped in 1950.
