= Japanese gunboat Ōshima =

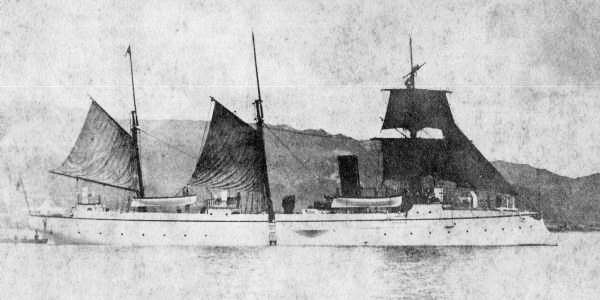
- Japanese gunboat Ōshima off Kobe

History

Empire of Japan
- Name: Ōshima
- Ordered: 1889
- Builder: Onohama Shipyards
- Laid down: 29 August 1889
- Launched: 14 October 1891
- Commissioned: 31 March 1892
- Stricken: 15 June 1905
- Fate: Sunk in collision 18 May 1904

General characteristics
- Type: Gunboat
- Displacement: 640 long tons (650 t)
- Length: 53.65 m (176.0 ft)
- Beam: 8.0 m (26 ft 3 in)
- Draught: 2.75 m (9 ft 0 in)
- Propulsion: reciprocating steam engine; 2 shafts, 4 boilers; 1,217 hp (908 kW)
- Speed: 13.0 knots (15.0 mph; 24.1 km/h)
- Range: 70 tons coal
- Complement: 130
- Armament: 4 × 120 mm (4.7 in) QF guns; 5 × 47 mm (1.9 in) Hotchkiss guns; 6 × 37 mm (1.5 in) Nordenfelt guns

Ōshima (大島) was a steam gunboat, serving in the early Imperial Japanese Navy. She was named after the island of Ōshima off Shizuoka prefecture.

== Background and design ==
Ōshima was a steel-hulled three-masted gunboat with a triple-expansion reciprocating steam engine with two boilers driving two screws which gave her a speed of 13 knots (24 km/h; 15 mph). Her design was based on a modified version of the Maya class and the French naval architect Louis-Émile Bertin contributed to her design. She is noteworthy in that she was the first ship to be built in Japan with a vertical triple-expansion steam engine.

She was equipped with four 120 mm (4.7 in) QF guns, one each on the bow, stern, and in sponsons on either side of the hull. Secondary armament included five 47 mm (1.9 in) Hotchkiss guns. Ōshima was laid down at the Onohama Shipyards in Kobe under direction of the Kure Naval Arsenal on 29 August 1889 and launched on 14 October 1891. She was completed on 31 March 1892.

== Operational history ==
Ōshima saw combat service in the First Sino-Japanese War, during which time an additional three 120 mm (4.7 in) guns and an additional three 47 mm (1.9 in) guns were fitted, patrolling between Korea, Dairen and Weihaiwei in a reserve capacity in the IJN 2nd Fleet.

On 21 March 1898, Ōshima was re-designated as a second-class gunboat, and was used for coastal survey and patrol duties. In September 1898, the Chinese reformer and journalist Liang Qichao fled to exile in Japan aboard Ōshima, which took him to Miyajima with the assistance of the Japanese government.

During the Russo-Japanese War, Ōshima assisted in the Siege of Port Arthur. On 18 May 1904, under the command of Commander Hirose Katsuhiko (the elder brother of the famous Takeo Hirose) she collided in a heavy fog with the gunboat Akagi and sank in the early hours of the following morning in Liaotung Bay off of Port Arthur at position 39°01′N 121°08′E.

Ōshima was removed from the navy list on 15 June 1905.
