= Japanese ship Musashi =

The name Musashi (武蔵) has been borne by three ships of the Japanese Navy and may refer to:

- Japanese steam warship Musashi, an early steam warship of the Imperial Japanese Navy, formerly USRC Kewanee.
- Japanese corvette Musashi, corvette of the Katsuragi-class corvette, of the Imperial Japanese Navy launched in 1886
- Japanese battleship Musashi, a Yamato-class battleship of the Imperial Japanese Navy World War II

== See also ==
- Musashi (disambiguation)
- List of ships named Musashi
