= Japanese ship Chōkai =

At least three naval vessels of Japan have borne the name Chōkai:

- Japanese gunboat Chōkai, a Maya-class gunboat, which saw service in the First Sino-Japanese War and the Russo-Japanese War
- Japanese cruiser Chōkai, a Takao-class heavy cruiser, which saw service in World War II
- JS Chōkai a Kongō-class guided missile destroyer commissioned in 1998
