= Katsuragi =

Katsuragi may refer to:

== Places in Japan ==
- Katsuragi, Nara, a city in Nara Prefecture
- Katsuragi, Wakayama, a town in Wakayama Prefecture
- Mount Yamato Katsuragi, a mountain in Nara Prefecture

== Ships ==
- Katsuragi-class corvette, 1885 class of Japanese sail-steamer corvettes
  - Japanese corvette Katsuragi, the lead ship of the class
- Japanese aircraft carrier Katsuragi, 1944 Unryū-class aircraft carrier

== Other uses ==
- Misato Katsuragi, an anime character from the Neon Genesis Evangelion media franchise
