= Japanese gunboat Akagi =

1888 Maya-class gunboat

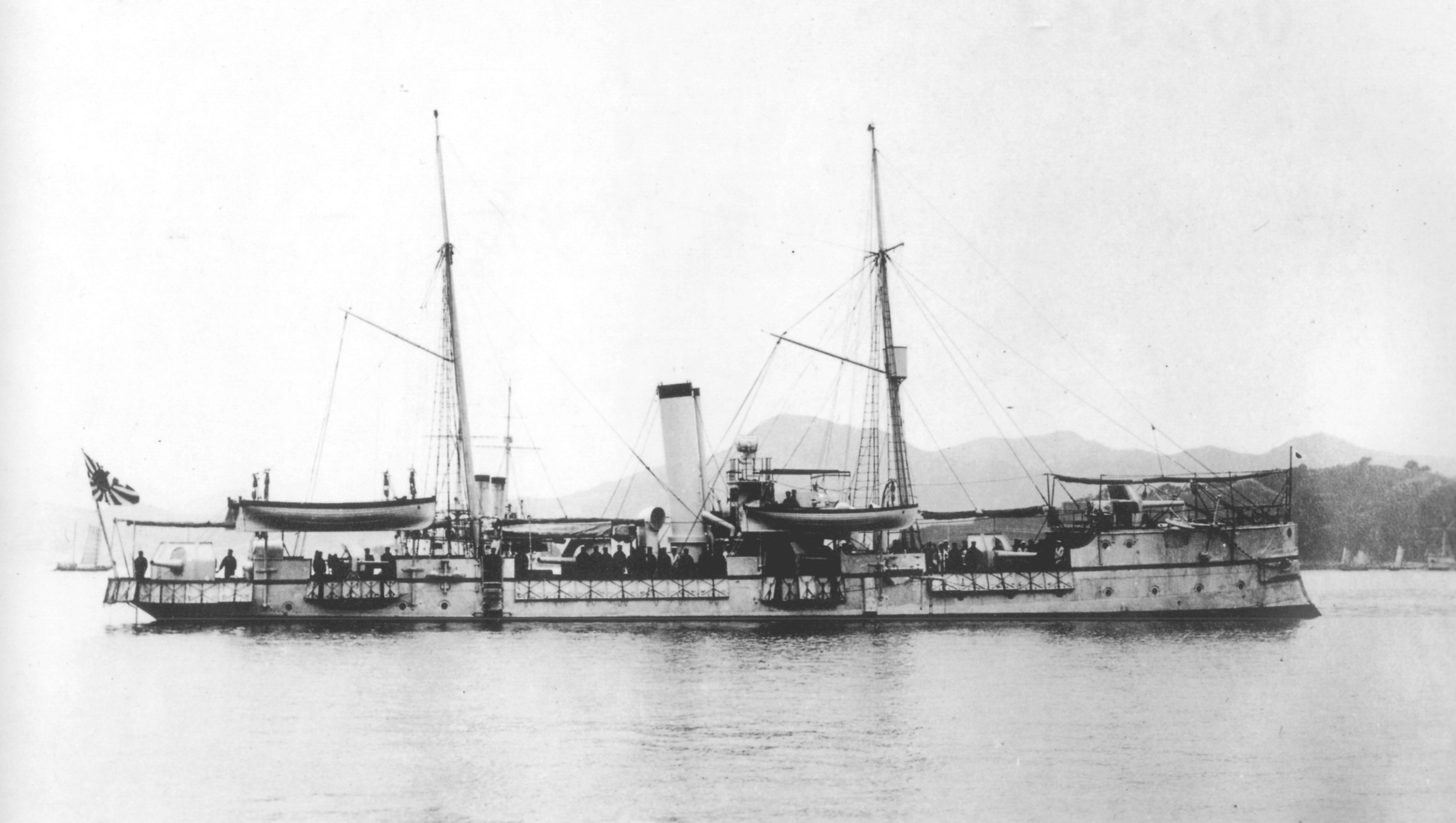
- Akagi at Kure in 1902

History

Empire of Japan
- Name: Akagi
- Ordered: 1885
- Builder: Onohama Shipyards
- Laid down: 20 July 1886
- Launched: 7 August 1888
- Commissioned: 20 August 1890
- Stricken: 1 April 1911
- Fate: Sold 1912; scrapped 1953

General characteristics
- Class & type: Maya-class gunboat
- Displacement: 622 long tons (632 t)
- Length: 51.0 m (167.3 ft)
- Beam: 8.2 m (26 ft 11 in)
- Draught: 2.95 m (9 ft 8 in)
- Propulsion: reciprocating steam engine; 2 shafts, 2 boilers; 963 hp (718 kW)
- Speed: 10.0 knots (11.5 mph; 18.5 km/h)
- Range: 74.4 tons coal
- Complement: 111
- Armament: 4 × 120 mm (4.7 in) Krupp L/22 breech-loading gun; 2 × quadruple 1-inch Nordenfelt guns

Service record
- Operations: Battle of the Yalu River (1894); Boxer Rebellion; Siege of Port Arthur

Akagi (赤城) was a steel-hulled, steam gunboat, serving in the early Imperial Japanese Navy. She was the fourth and final vessel to be completed in the four-vessel Maya class and was named after Mount Akagi in Gunma Prefecture.

== Background ==
Akagi was the last in a series of 600-ton gunboats, which included the Maya, Chōkai, and Atago, built from 1885–1886 under the supervisor of the French naval architect, Bellard. She was the only vessel in the class to be equipped with a steel-hull instead of an iron or composite hull.

== Construction ==
Akagi was designed with a horizontal double expansion reciprocating steam engine with two cylindrical boilers driving two screws. She also had two masts for a schooner sail rig. Initially, she was armed with one Krupp 210 mm (8 in) L/22 breech-loading gun, one Krupp 120 mm (4.7 in) L/22 breech-loading gun and two quadruple 1-inch Nordenfelt guns, and was intended primarily for port defense. However, by early 1894, she had been rebuilt with a high short forecastle and four 120-millimeter guns arranged on her centerline, six 47-mm rapid-fire guns (two by the bridge, facing forward, and two mounted in small sponsons on either side of the hull). All guns were protected by gun shields. Well-armed for her size, she was soon rendered obsolete with the introduction of larger protected cruisers into the Imperial Japanese Navy inventory.

== Service record ==
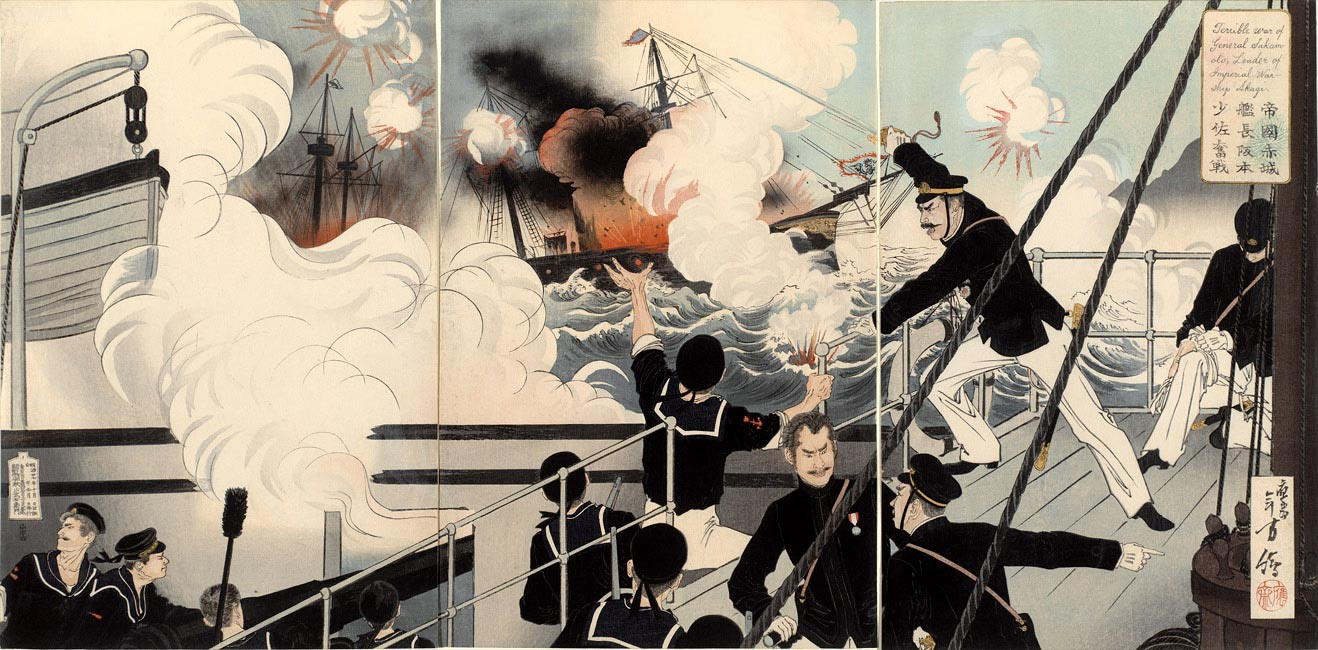
Ukiyo-e depicting Akagi in the Battle of the Yalu River in the First Sino-Japanese War, titled "Lieutenant-Commander Sakamoto of the Imperial Warship Akagi, Fights Bravely"

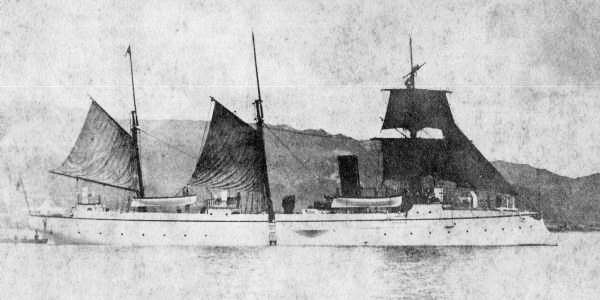
IJN Gunboat Ōshima

Akagi was laid down at the Onohama Shipyards on 20 July 1886 and launched on 7 August 1888. She was completed on 20 August 1890.

Akagi saw combat service in the First Sino-Japanese War, initially patrolling between Korea, Dairen and Weihaiwei. She was included in the Japanese squadron at the Battle of the Yalu River by Japanese Admiral Itō Sukeyuki, as he needed a ship with shallow draft to explore the shallows of Korea Bay. When the Japanese fleet closed with the Chinese Beiyang Fleet on 17 September 1894, Akagi was ordered protect the Japanese command ship, the converted passenger liner Saikyō Maru carrying Admiral Kabeyama Sukenori, towards the rear of the Japanese lines. However, Akagi came under attack by the much larger and faster Chinese cruiser Laiyuan at 13:20 hours. When Laiyuan closed to 800 metres (870 yd), Akagi opened fire, causing considerable damage and setting Laiyuan on fire. However, Laiyuan’s first salvo struck Akagi on the bridge, killing her captain, Sakamoto Hachirota. Command of the vessel was transferred to her navigator, Lieutenant Satō Tetsutarō, but Akagi continued to be pounded by the Chinese ship, with damage to her lower deck housing, and severing a steam line. Hot steam cut off access to her magazine, and shells had to be hand-fed through a broken vent to reach her guns. Akagi attempted to escape, but was raked from the stern by a full broadside by Laiyuan, whereas she could counter with only one of her 120-mm guns. When Laiyuan has closed to 300 metres (330 yd), she again scored a hit on Akagi’s bridge, incapacitating her provisional captain. Command was then transferred to a junior lieutenant, and Akagi continued to return fire with her stern guns. However, by 14:20, the fire on Laiyuan has spread to the extent that future offensive maneuvering was impossible, and she broke off pursuit. Akagi drifted out of control for the remainder of the battle, as her crew battled to fix damage. After the battle ended, she was able to return to the Japanese squadron under her own power. During this brief encounter, 11 men were killed and 17 wounded out of her crew of 111 men; however, she was credited with having taken a major enemy ship out of action.

On 21 March 1898, Akagi was re-designated as a second-class gunboat., and was used for coastal survey and patrol duties. During the Boxer Rebellion, Akagi was assigned to patrol off the Taku Forts.

During the Russo-Japanese War, Akagi assisted in the Siege of Port Arthur. On 2 May 1904, she assisted in the attempted blockade of the channel leading into the port. She was later sent to the western coast of Kwantung Peninsula to provide fire support during the Battle of Nanshan. While on patrol outside Port Arthur on 18 May 1904 she collided with the gunboat Ōshima, which subsequently sank. Akagi later participated in the Invasion of Sakhalin.

Akagi was removed the navy list on 1 April 1911, and after being demilitarized, was sold as a transport in March 1912 to the Kawasaki Kisen Corporation as Akagi Maru. She was again sold in 1921 to the Amagasaki Steamship Lines, and sank in 1945 during a typhoon. She was raised, and placed into service again, only to be sunk by a naval mine in the Seto Inland Sea off of Okayama Prefecture in January 1946. Raised once more and repaired, she was placed back into service, until she was finally scrapped at Osaka in 1953.
