= List of ships named Musashi =

Several ships have been named Musashi (武蔵):

- Japanese steam warship Musashi, an early steam warship of the Imperial Japanese Navy, formerly USRC Kewanee
- Japanese corvette Musashi, corvette of the Katsuragi-class corvette, of the Imperial Japanese Navy launched in 1886
- Japanese battleship Musashi, a Yamato-class battleship of the Imperial Japanese Navy in World War II
- Musashi (yacht), a super yacht built by Feadship and delivered to business magnate Larry Ellison in 2010
- MS Musashi, a Panamanian cargo ship

== See also ==
- Musashi (disambiguation)
- Japanese ship Musashi
