= Hirose Katsuhiko =

Japanese Vice Admiral (1864–1919)

- 広瀬 勝比古
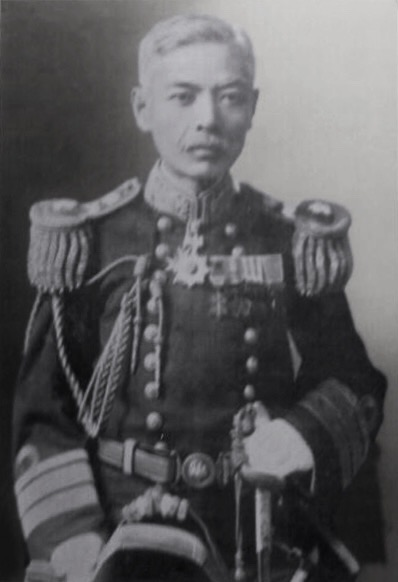
- Born: September 20, 1862; Bungo, Japan
- Died: October 20, 1920 (aged 58)
- Burial place: Aoyama Cemetery, Minato, Tokyo, Japan
- Education: Imperial Japanese Naval Academy
- Relatives: Hirose Takeo (brother)
- Military career
- Allegiance: Empire of Japan
- Branch: Imperial Japanese Navy
- Service years: 1883–1920
- Rank: Rear admiral
- Commands: Oshima; Chōkai; Akitsushima; Tsukuba
- Conflicts: First Sino-Japanese War; Battle of Pungdo; Russo-Japanese War; Battle of Port Arthur; Battle of the Yellow Sea; Battle of Tsushima

Hirose Katsuhiko (広瀬 勝比古, Hirose Katsuhiko; September 20, 1862 – October 20, 1920) was a Japanese rear admiral of the First Sino-Japanese War and the Russo-Japanese War. He was known as the elder brother of the war hero Hirose Takeo as well as the commander of the Akitsushima during the Battle of Tsushima.

== Early military career ==
Born in Bungo Province (modern day Oita Prefecture) as the eldest son of Hirose Shigetake, a feudal retainer of the Oka clan and the head of the court with his only brother being Hirose Takeo. In October 1883, he graduated from the Imperial Japanese Naval Academy's 10th class and became an assistant lieutenant in the navy. In April 1886, he was commissioned as an ensign.

In August 1889, he was promoted to lieutenant and assumed the command of the Nisshin. After that, he successively held positions such as captain of the Atago and Nisshin, squad leader of the Ryūjō, Chief Messenger of Sasebo Naval District and as a messenger of the Minister and Secretary of the Navy, Saigō Jūdō. In June 1893, he became chief gunnery officer of the Naniwa and participated in the First Sino-Japanese War within the Battle of Pungdo.

In September 1895, he became a member of the second Bureau of the Naval General Staff and an adjutant but then went on a business trip to the United Kingdom aboard the Takasago. In December 1897, he was promoted to lieutenant commander of the navy and appointed chief gunnery officer of the Takasago. After working as a staff officer at the Kure Naval Base, he was promoted to Commander in October 1898. In December of the same year, he was assigned to the first Bureau of the Naval General Staff and Adjutant to Marshal Saigō Jūdō, after which he successively served as deputy commanders of the Kasagi, the Iwate, and the Mikasa, as well as chief of the inspection department of the Kure Arsenal.

== Russo-Japanese War ==
In December 1903, he became captain of the Oshima and went to the Russo-Japanese War and initially participated in the Battle of Port Arthur. On May 18, 1904, the Oshima was hit by the gunboat Akagi and sank in heavy fog while on a patrol off the coast of Lushun. In the same month, he was transferred to become captain of the Chōkai. In January 1905, he assumed the post of captain of the Akitsushima and on the same month, was promoted to captain. He took part in the Battle of the Yellow Sea. In June of the same year, he was transferred to Captain of the Naniwa.

In August 1905, he was attached to the Yokosuka Naval District, and took a leave of absence in March 1906. From September of the same year, he studied at the Naval War College as an elective student. In October 1907, he assumed the post of captain of Fuji. After serving as captain of the Tsukuba, he was appointed in December 1910. In April 1911, he was promoted to Rear Admiral, and in December of the same year, he was transferred to the reserves and on 27 August 1918 he was made a backup.

== Court Ranks ==
- Senior Eighth Rank (July 8, 1886)
- Junior Seventh Rank (December 16, 1891)
- Senior Sixth Rank (October 31, 1898)
- Senior Fifth Rank (July 20, 1909)
- Junior Fourth Rank (December 20, 1911)

== Awards ==
- Order of the Rising Sun, 6th Class (November 18, 1895)
- Order of the Golden Kite, 5th Class (November 18, 1895)
- 1894–95 Sino-Japanese War Medal (May 10, 1902)

=== Foreign Awards ===
- Korea: Commemorative Medal of the Emperor of Korea's Southwest Tour (April 14, 1910)
