= Japanese ship Katsuragi =

Two naval vessels of Japan have been named Katsuragi:

- Japanese corvette Katsuragi, the lead ship of that class.
- Japanese aircraft carrier Katsuragi was an Unryū-class aircraft carrier of the Imperial Japanese Navy during World War II.

== See also ==
- The Katsuragi-class corvette, in the late 19th century and early 20th century.
