= Japanese ship Atago =

At least four warships of Japan have borne the name Atago:

- Japanese gunboat Atago, was a Maya-class gunboat launched in 1887 and sunk in 1904
- Japanese battlecruiser Atago, was an Amagi-class battlecruiser scrapped on slip in 1924
- Japanese cruiser Atago, was a Takao-class cruiser launched in 1930 and sunk in 1944
- JS Atago, is an Atago-class destroyer launched in 2005
