= Japanese corvette Katsuragi =

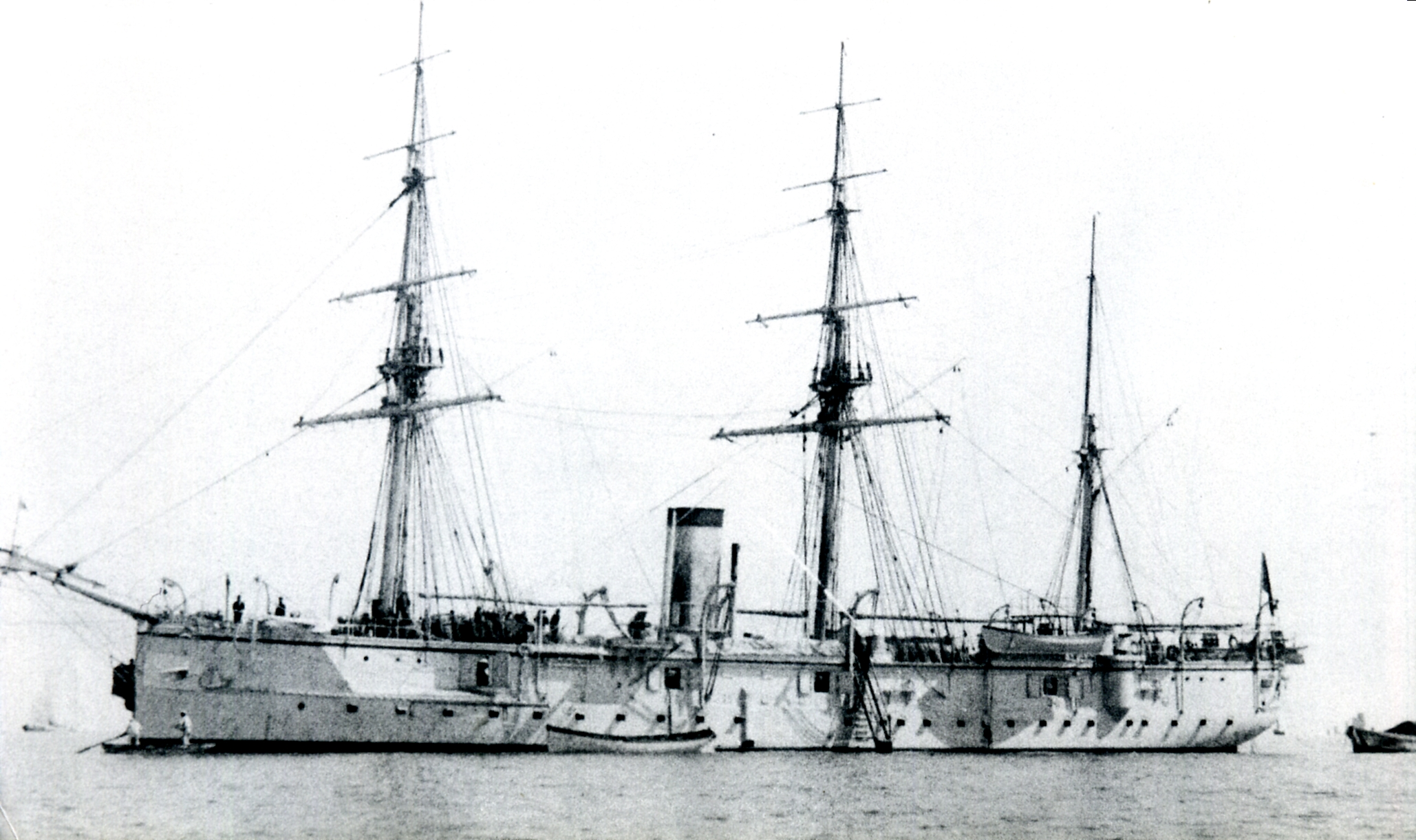
- Katsuragi in 1897

History

Empire of Japan
- Name: Katsuragi
- Ordered: 1882 Fiscal Year
- Builder: Yokosuka Naval Arsenal, Japan
- Laid down: 18 August 1883
- Launched: 31 March 1885
- Commissioned: 4 November 1887
- Stricken: 11 April 1913
- Fate: Scrapped, 11 April 1913

General characteristics
- Class & type: Katsuragi-class corvette
- Displacement: 1,500 t (1,476 long tons)
- Length: 62.78 m (206 ft 0 in)
- Beam: 10.7 m (35 ft 1 in)
- Draft: 4.6 m (15 ft 1 in)
- Installed power: 1,622 ihp (1,210 kW)
- Propulsion: 1 × horizontally mounted reciprocating steam engine; 6 boilers, 2 × screws
- Sail plan: Barque-rigged sloop (3 × masts)
- Speed: 13 kn (24 km/h; 15 mph)
- Capacity: 132 t (146 short tons) coal
- Complement: 231
- Armament: 2 × 170 mm (6.7 in) Krupp breech-loading guns; 5 × 120 mm (4.7 in) Krupp breech-loading guns; 1 × 80 mm (3.1 in) Krupp QF gun; 4 × quadruple 1-inch Nordenfelt guns; 2 × 380 mm (15 in) torpedo tubes

Katsuragi (葛城) was the lead ship in the Katsuragi class of three composite hulled, sail-and-steam corvettes of the early Imperial Japanese Navy. The ship was named for a mountain located between Osaka and Nara prefectures.

== Background ==
Katsuragi was designed as an iron-ribbed, wooden-hulled, three-masted barque-rigged sloop-of-war with a coal-fired double-expansion reciprocating steam engine with six cylindrical boilers driving a double screw. Her basic design was based on experience gained in building Kaimon and Tenryū sloops, but was already somewhat obsolescent in comparison to contemporary European warships when completed. Katsuragi was laid down at Yokosuka Naval Arsenal 18 August 1883 under the direction of British-educated Japanese naval architect Sasō Sachū. She was launched on 31 March 1885 and commissioned on 4 November 1887.

== Operational history ==
Katsuragi saw combat service in the First Sino-Japanese War of 1894–1895, patrolling between Korea, Dairen and Weihaiwei. She was also at the Battle of Yalu River in a reserve capacity in the Western Sea Fleet.

On 21 March 1898, Katsuragi was re-designated a third-class gunboat, and was used for coastal survey and patrol duties.

On 6 October 1900, Katsuragi ran aground off of Izu Ōshima. It took over a month to refloat her, after which she underwent extensive repairs at Yokosuka, during which time her sail rigging was removed, and she was rearmed with eight QF 2.5 pdr guns and six quadruple Nordenfelt guns, and her torpedoes were upgraded from 15 inch to 18-inch torpedo tubes.

During the Russo-Japanese War of 1904–1905, Katsuragi served as a guard ship in Nagasaki harbor.

Katsuragi was refitted again in 1907, when her guns were replaced with four 3-inch and two 2.5-inch guns, and she was reclassified as a survey ship. She was reclassified again as a second-class coastal patrol vessel on 28 August 1912, and was removed from the navy list and scrapped on 4 November 1913.
