= Tōgō Masamichi =

Baron Tōgō Masamichi
- 東郷 正路
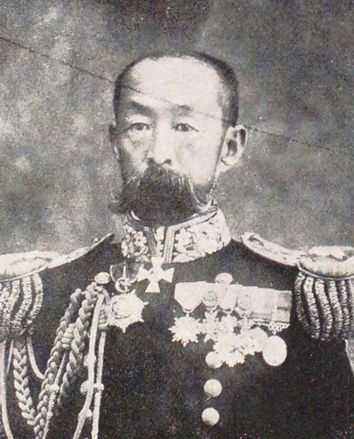
- Born: 19 April 1852; Fukui, Fukui, Japan
- Died: 4 January 1906 (aged 53)
- Military career
- Allegiance: Empire of Japan
- Branch: Imperial Japanese Navy
- Service years: 1877–1906
- Rank: Vice Admiral
- Conflicts: First Sino-Japanese War; Russo-Japanese War

Baron Tōgō Masamichi (東郷 正路; 19 April 1852 – 4 January 1906) was an admiral in the early Imperial Japanese Navy.

== Biography ==
Tōgō was born to a samurai family of Fukui Domain. He was sent by the domain to the predecessor of the Imperial Japanese Army Academy when it was still located in Osaka, but left without graduating, and then entered the fourth class of the Imperial Japanese Naval Academy located in Tsukiji, Tokyo and was commissioned into the Imperial Japanese Navy.

He served in his early career on the corvette Tsukuba, gunboat Kenko and the ironclads Ryūjō and Fuso. He was promoted to lieutenant in 1885 and lieutenant commander in 1890. He later served on the staff of the Readiness Fleet. Tōgō was then executive officer on the cruiser Yaeyama, ironclad Kongō, and cruiser Chiyoda before receiving his first command, the training ship Manju, in 1893.

During the First Sino-Japanese War, Tōgō was captain of the gunboat Chōkai. He later commanded the Saikyō Maru, and corvettes Amagi and Musashi. After a stint at the Naval Staff College, he commanded the cruisers Yaeyama and Saien.

In 1897, Tōgō was appointed chief of staff of Kure Naval District and in 1899 oversaw the completion of the new armored cruiser Yakumo at AG Vulcan Stettin in Germany and her first voyage to Japan. In 1902, he was promoted to rear admiral and served as commandant of the Imperial Japanese Naval Academy.

Immediately before the start of the Russo-Japanese War, Tōgō was appointed commander of the 6th Battle Division of the IJN 3rd Fleet, which consisted of four cruisers led by his flagship, Suma. He fought at the Battle of the Yellow Sea and the Battle of Tsushima. In November 1905, after the end of the war, he was promoted to vice admiral and commander of the IJN 4th Fleet; however, he died only two months later. He was promoted to baron (danshaku) under the kazoku peerage posthumously. His grave is at Aoyama Cemetery in Tokyo.
