= Japanese ship Akagi =

At least two warships of Japan have borne the name Akagi:

- Japanese gunboat Akagi, which served in the Sino-Japanese War
- Japanese aircraft carrier Akagi, which served in World War II
