= Heitarō Takenouchi =

Japanese Rear-Admiral (1863–1933)

- 竹内平太郎
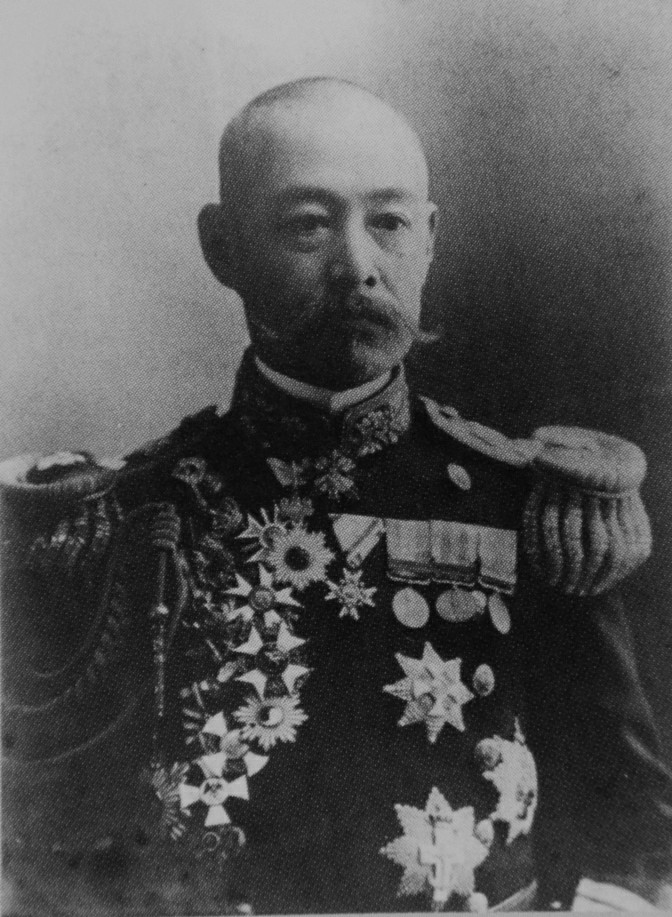
- Born: February 6, 1863; Matsue, Matsue Domain, Japan
- Died: December 21, 1933 (aged 70); Nishinomiya, Hyōgo, Japan
- Spouse: Nukio Takenouchi
- Military career
- Allegiance: Japan
- Branch: Imperial Japanese Navy
- Service years: 1877–1910
- Rank: Rear admiral
- Commands: Nisshin
- Conflicts: Boxer Rebellion; Russo-Japanese War; Battle of Tsushima

Heitarō Takenouchi (竹内平太郎, Takenouchi Heitarō; February 6, 1863 – December 21, 1933) was a Japanese rear admiral during the Russo-Japanese War who commanded the Nisshin and successfully delivered the Kasuga and Nisshin from Genoa to Yokosuka.

== Family ==
Heitarō was born on February 6, 1863, at Matsue into a family that would eventually restore the castle tower of Matsue Castle. His eldest son, Kazunobu Takenouchi, was the Colonel of the 53rd Air Division and the 7th Air Communications Regiment of the Imperial Japanese Army at the end of World War II.

== Early Military Career ==
On 1877, he enrolled in the Imperial Japanese Naval Academy before graduating from its 8th class as its deputy director before being promoted to ensign on 1885. Takenouchi was then promoted to captain in 1882 and later sent to France to study abroad on 1892. He returned to Japan in 1894 before becoming part of the Saikai Fleet Staff in 1895. Following that, he was promoted to Sub-lieutenant in 1896 and to Lieutenant in 1897. On 1898, Takenouchi was named the deputy director of the Akashi and given further offices such as the Deputy Captain of the Yashima and Captain of the Atago. Takenouchi then dispatched a land detachment to fight in the Boxer Rebellion as well as have a Military attaché with the French Legation at Peking and by 1901, he was promoted to captain.

== Delivery of the Nisshin and Kasuga ==
Captain Takeuchi, who arrived at the military attaché in France in 1900, said that his main task was to collect Russian military information in France, where the Franco-Russian Alliance had strengthened military relations with Russia. On December 22, 1903, the Navy's Deputy Secretary, Saitō Makoto, told Captain Takeuchi in Paris that two Giuseppe Garibaldi-class cruisers had been ordered by the Argentine Army in preparation for the Russo-Japanese War which would later be the Nisshin and the Kasuga. The ships were confirmed to be located at the port of Genova and a top secret instruction was issued to investigate the matters necessary for the round trip to Japan.

The contents of the top secret electric train at that time are as follows.

Captain Takeuchi in Paris

Under Secretary of the Navy

Your secret information and speed, Italy, "Ansaldo", the company, "Argentina", two warships, the current situation: (Omitted)

- 1. Current status of hull engine and military uniform
- 1. Institutional and cannon sea trial results
- 1. How much preparation is required for Japan's second round trip?

After that, Japan purchased both ships and decided to transport them to Japan with Commander Kantarō Suzuki, who was a military attaché at the Embassy of Japan in Germany. At the time, the route from the Mediterranean Sea to the Sea of Japan was a long one with the Suez Canal being a shortcut. In order to transport Nisshin and Kasuga to Japan as soon as possible, the route via the Suez Canal was an absolute requirement. However, at that time, the relationship between Japan and Russia was getting worse every moment toward the start of the war, and it was easy to assume that the Russian Black Sea Fleet would block the passage of Nisshin and Kasuga. Therefore, Japan requested assistance from its ally, the United Kingdom to gather local sailors, and on January 7, 1904, the Nisshin and Kasuga departed from Genoa. After that, Takenouchi succeeded in passing in front of the Russian Black Sea Fleet. The ships departed Singapore on February 4 and left Singapore on February 16 before arriving at Yokosuka. The declaration of the war against Russia was decided at the Gozen Kaigi on the 4th, and on February 6, Russo-Japanese relations were severed. Around this time, Takeuchi and Suzuki were personally thanked by Emperor Meiji for their delivery of the ships.

== Russo-Japanese War ==
During the war, Takenouchi became the captain of the Nisshin and went on to participate at the Battle of Tsushima. During the battle, the captain's messenger Isoroku Yamamoto was heavily wounded and the ship's constructor, Manuel Domek Garcia was aboard the ship as a military attaché.

== The Missing Documents ==
When Takenouchi was assigned to Paris as the chief military attaché with the embassy in France, a comfort bag was regularly delivered from a person named Kaoru Takeuchi to his home in Kojimachi, Tokyo. In the spring of 1910, while Heitaro Takeuchi was working at the Kure Naval District Government Building, Takeuchi visited the official residence and asked Takenouchi to visit him. His wife, Nuiko, was the first person to meet Takeuchi, but he was the sender who had been sent a comfort bag for more than a dozen years. In order to prepare her tea, Nuiko returned to the Japanese-style building, leaving the woman alone, and by the time she brought the tea confectionery into the drawing room of the Western-style building about 10 minutes later, Takeuchi had already disappeared. After that, when Takenouchi returned to the official residence about 20 minutes later, he checked the study next to the drawing room and found that the "important confidential documents" in the drawer of the desk had been missing. He immediately contacted the Kure gendarmerie, and although a cordon was set up in Kure, he was unable to find Takeuchi.

Since he was a military attaché in France, Takeuchi had been collecting information such as military information and intelligence activities of the great powers, mainly Russia, and had always been marked and followed by Russian spies and operatives. Heitaro Takeuchi, who was keenly aware of the responsibility for this exposure incident, submitted a resignation request to Commander-in-Chief Katō Tomosaburō of the Kure Naval District, served in the Imperial Japanese Navy General Staff, and was put into the reserve list by January 1911. At the age of 49, he resigned from the Imperial Japanese Navy. After that, Rear-Admiral Takeuchi was placed in fourth rank for his many years of military service. The reasoning why Heitarō resigned is rarely mentioned in official historical sources related to the former Navy. The author's mother, Nobu Maeda (the second daughter of Heitarō), told her daughter in detail about the situation at the time of the incident from Nukio and remains a hidden story published in "No. 17".

== Court Ranks ==
- Senior 8th Rank (September 16, 1885)
- Junior 7th Rank (January 17, 1890)
- Senior 7th Rank (December 16, 1891)
- Senior 6th Rank (March 8, 1898)

== Awards ==
- Military Medal of Honor (November 18, 1895)
- Order of the Golden Kite, 3rd Class (April 1, 1906)
- Order of the Rising Sun, 5th Class (Note: Per his photograph.)
