= Japanese corvette Musashi =

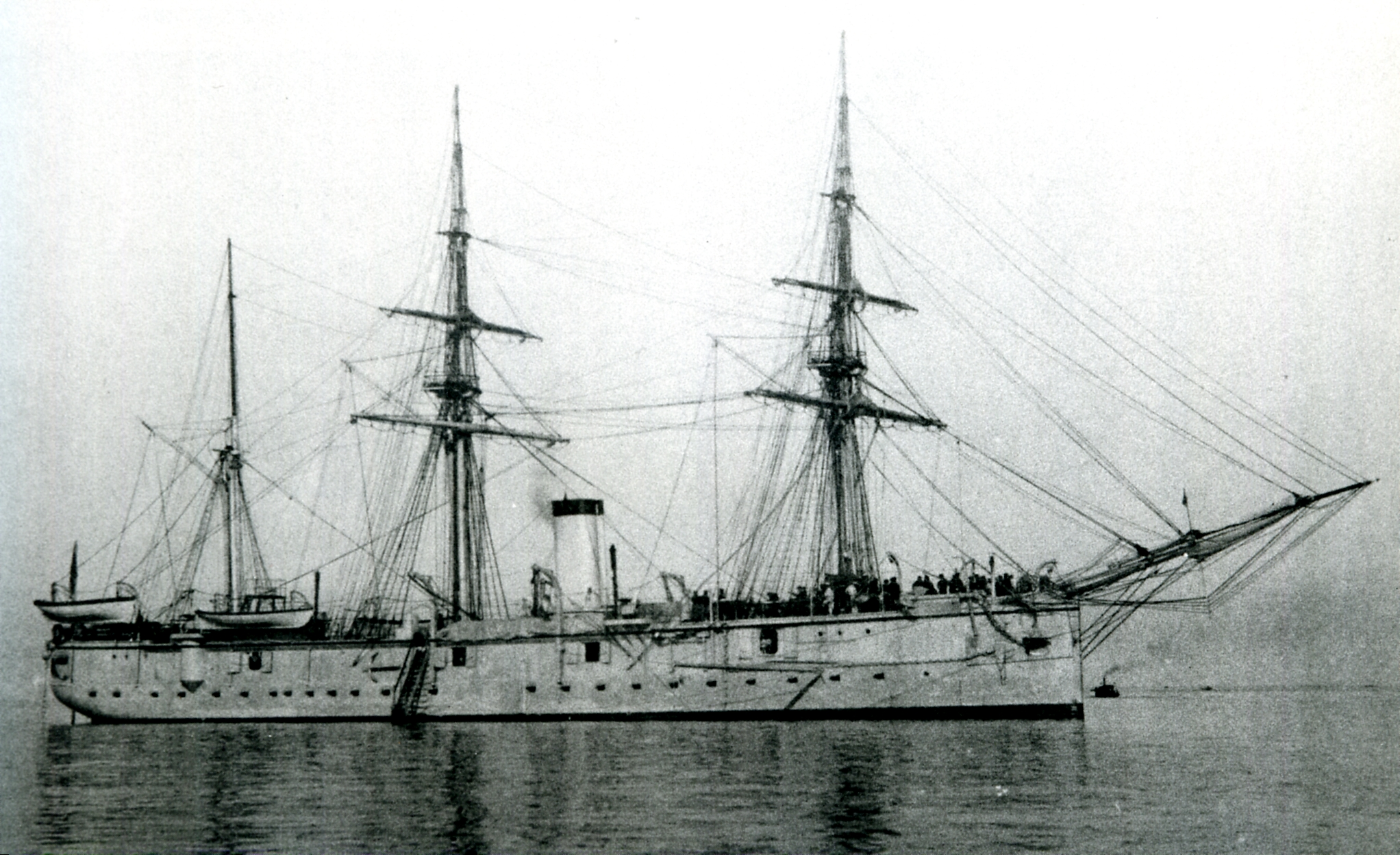
- Musashi circa 1897

History

Empire of Japan
- Name: Musashi
- Ordered: 1883 Fiscal Year
- Builder: Yokosuka Naval Arsenal, Japan
- Laid down: 1 October 1884
- Launched: 30 March 1886
- Commissioned: 9 February 1887
- Stricken: 1 April 1928
- Fate: Scrapped 1935

General characteristics
- Class & type: Katsuragi-class corvette
- Displacement: 1,476 long tons (1,500 t)
- Length: 62.78 m (206 ft 0 in)
- Beam: 10.7 m (35 ft 1 in)
- Draft: 4.6 m (15 ft 1 in)
- Installed power: 1,622 ihp (1,210 kW)
- Propulsion: 1 × horizontally mounted reciprocating steam engine; 6 boilers, 2 × screws
- Sail plan: Barque-rigged sloop
- Speed: 13 knots (15 mph; 24 km/h)
- Capacity: 132 t (146 short tons) coal
- Complement: 231
- Armament: 2 × 170 mm (6.7 in) Krupp breech-loading guns; 5 × 120 mm (4.7 in) Krupp breech-loading guns; 1 × 80 mm (3.1 in) Krupp QF gun; 4 × quadruple 1-inch Nordenfelt guns; 2 × 380 mm (15 in) torpedo tubes

Musashi (武蔵) was the third and final vessel in the Katsuragi class of composite hulled, sail-and-steam corvettes of the early Imperial Japanese Navy. It was named for Musashi province, a former province of Japan located in the Kantō region. The name was used again for the more famous World War II battleship Musashi.

== Background ==
Katsuragi was designed as an iron-ribbed, wooden-hulled, three-masted barque-rigged sloop-of-war with a coal-fired double-expansion reciprocating steam engine with six cylindrical boilers driving a double screw. Her basic design was based on experience gained in building Kaimon and Tenryū sloops, but was already somewhat obsolescent in comparison to contemporary European warships when completed.

Musashi was laid down at Yokosuka Naval Arsenal on 1 October 1884 under the direction of British-educated Japanese naval architect Sasō Sachū. She was launched on 30 March 1886 and commissioned on 9 February 1887. He first captain was Lieutenant Commander Arima Shin'ichi.

== Operational history ==
Musashi saw combat service in the First Sino-Japanese War of 1894-1895, patrolling between Korea, Dairen and Weihaiwei. She was also at the Battle of Yalu River in a reserve capacity in the Western Sea Fleet.

On 21 March 1898, Musashi was re-designated a third-class gunboat, and was used for coastal survey and patrol duties. On 1 May 1902, she was driven onto a sandbar at the mouth of Nemuro Bay because of strong winds, and required three months of repairs after she was refloated. The cruiser Yaeyama was also grounded in Nemuro Bay by the same storm.

During the Russo-Japanese War of 1904-1905, Musashi served as a guard ship in Hakodate harbor under the command of Lieutenant Commander Tochinai Sojirō.

Musashi was refitted again in 1907, when her guns were replaced with four 3-inch and two 2.5-inch guns, and she was reclassified as a second-class coastal patrol vessel on 28 August 1912, but was used primarily for training duties. She was reclassified again on 1 April 1922 as a survey ship. She was removed from the navy list on 1 April 1928. and was designated “Hulk No.5” on 6 July. The hulk was obtained by the Ministry of Justice on 3 October and towed to Odawara, Kanagawa, where it was anchored in the harbor and used as a prison for juvenile convicts. The hulk was broken up for scrap in 1935.
