= Tachibana Shūta =

Japanese soldier

- 橘周太
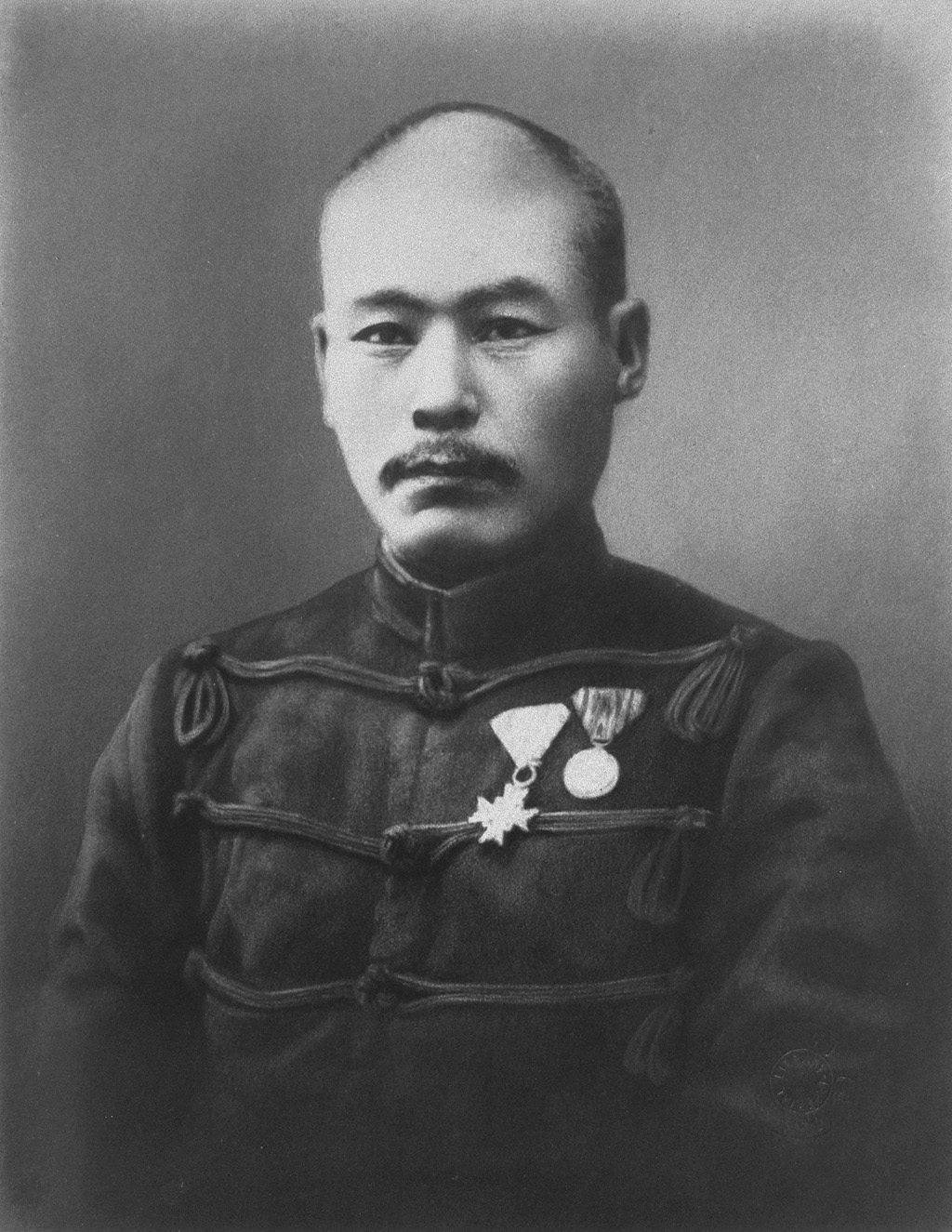
- Born: 3 November 1865; Nagasaki Prefecture, Japan
- Died: 31 August 1904 (aged 38); Liaoyang, China
- Military career
- Allegiance: Empire of Japan
- Branch: Imperial Japanese Army
- Service years: 1887–1904
- Rank: Major
- Conflicts: Russo-Japanese War; Battle of Liaoyang †

Tachibana Shūta (橘 周太, Shūta Tachibana; 3 November 1865 – 31 August 1904) was a soldier in the early Imperial Japanese Army, noted for his heroic death in combat during the Russo-Japanese War.

== Biography ==
Tachibana was born as the second son to a village headman in Nagasaki Prefecture. On 21 July 1887 he graduated from the 9th class of the predecessor of the Imperial Japanese Army Academy and was commissioned as a second lieutenant in the IJA 5th Infantry Regiment, stationed in Aomori Prefecture. From December 1888 he was assigned to the 4th Regiment of the Imperial Guards, rising to the post of platoon leader on 15 January 1889. He was assigned as an aide-de-camp to the Crown Prince on 24 January 1891 and was promoted to lieutenant on 14 April 1892 and captain on 9 July 1895. From 13 November 1895 he was assigned to the Imperial General Headquarters.

In March 1896 Tachibana became a company commander of the 2nd Infantry Regiment of the Taiwan Garrison, but in September he was transferred back to the 4th Regiment of the Imperial Guard, and in November he was appointed a company commander in the 36th Infantry Regiment. From 1897 he was an instructor at the Toyama Military Academy. In April 1902, Tachibana was promoted to major and became commandant of the Nagoya Cadet Corps . He authored a number of military manuals, including "Education of Recruits" (新兵教育) , "Teaching night infantry maneuvers" (歩兵夜間教育), "Rules of the passage through the forest " (森林通過法).

After the start of the Russo-Japanese War in February 1904, Tachibana was initially assigned to the staff of the Japanese Second Army, but a few months later received a combat posting to command the 1st Battalion of the IJA 34th Infantry Regiment. Twenty days later, on 31 August 1904 at the Battle of Liaoyang, while Japanese forces were on the offensive against a fortified height, Tachibana refused to follow orders to take cover in trenches because of the intense Russian fire, but announced his intent to charge the Russian position. He was immediately killed by Russian bullets the moment he left the safety of the trench.

== Posthumous glorification ==
Although Tachibana's rash and impetuous action led to his death without accomplishing anything notable on the battlefield, wartime propaganda immediately seized on his story. He was posthumously promoted to lieutenant colonel, and was awarded the highest decorations possible for that rank: the Order of the Golden Kite, 4th class and the Order of the Rising Sun, 4th class. His 34th Infantry Regiment was renamed the "Tachibana Regiment". Bronze monuments to Tachibana were erected in his home town and several cities in Japan, and the bay near his home was officially renamed "Tachibana Bay". He was popularized in at least five songs, and his biography became a textbook role model in schools. In 1928, under State Shinto, he was deified, becoming (along with Takeo Hirose and Nogi Maresuke) one of the gunshin, and his birthplace converted into a Shinto shrine, the Tachibana Jinja. The shrine still exists, and contains a museum with some of his personal effects.
