= Musashi =

Musashi (武蔵) is a Japanese name, which may refer to:

== People ==
- Miyamoto Musashi (宮本 武蔵; c. 1584 – 1645), Japanese master swordsman, painter, and author of The Book of Five Rings
- Musashi Kanbe (かんべ むさし; born 1948), Japanese science fiction writer
- Musashi Mizushima (水島 武蔵; born 1964), Japanese former professional footballer
- Musashi (kickboxer) (武蔵; born 1972), Japanese retired kickboxer
- Mark Musashi (マーク 武蔵; born 1977), Wushu martial artist and actor
- Musashi Okuyama (奥山 武宰士; born 1991), Japanese footballer
- Musashi (wrestler), ring name of Daichi Sasaki (佐々木大地; born 1991), Japanese pro wrestler

== Places ==
- Musashi Province, an old province of Japan
- Musashi Imperial Graveyard
- Musashi, Ōita, Japan
- Musashi University
- Musashi-Kosugi Station

== Science ==
- Musashi-1, RNA-binding protein Musashi homolog 1
- Musashi-2, RNA-binding protein Musashi homolog 2

== Transportation ==
- List of ships named Musashi
- Limited express Musashi trains on the Seibu Ikebukuro Line

== Entertainment ==
- Musashi (novel), a 1935 novel by Eiji Yoshikawa
- Musashi's, a Japanese feline musical group
- Musashi, a 1974 manga written by Kazuo Koike and illustrated by Noboru Kawasaki
- Brave Fencer Musashi, a 1998 PlayStation video game
- Musashi: Samurai Legend, a 2005 PlayStation 2 video game
- Vagabond (manga), a 1998 manga by mangaka Takehiko Inoue

== Characters ==
- Joe Musashi, the protagonist of the Shinobi video games
- Musashi, the protagonist of the video games Brave Fencer Musashi and Musashi: Samurai Legend
- Musashi, a character in Eyeshield 21
- Musashi (Pokémon) or Jessie, a member of The Team Rocket trio in Pokémon
- Musashi (Shugo Chara!), a character in Shugo Chara!
- Musashi Haruno, the main character in Ultraman Cosmos
- Musashi Natsuki, the protagonist of Musashi no Ken
- Musashi Tomoe, a character in the mecha series Getter Robo
- Musashi, the protagonist of the video game Sushi Striker: The Way of Sushido
- Musashi, the main character of the manga/anime Orient by Shinobu Ohtaka

== See also ==
- Musashino
- Kōzuke-Musashi Campaign
