= Japanese gunboat Chōkai =

Japanese steam gunboat

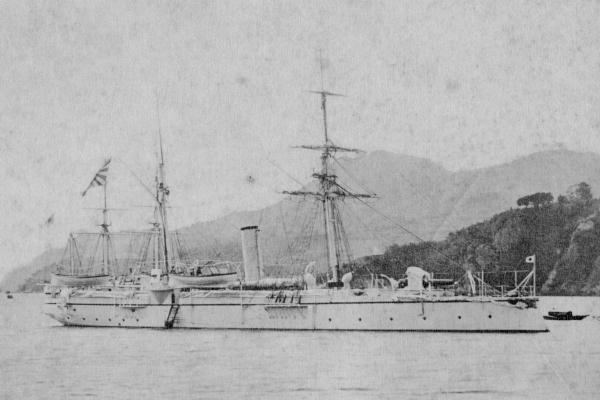
- Japanese gunboat Chōkai at Sasebo, 1889

History

Empire of Japan
- Name: Chōkai
- Ordered: 1883
- Builder: Ishikawajima-Hirano Shipyards
- Laid down: 25 January 1886
- Launched: 20 August 1887
- Commissioned: 27 December 1888
- Decommissioned: 1 April 1908
- Stricken: 23 May 1911
- Fate: Scrapped 1912

General characteristics
- Class & type: Maya-class gunboat
- Displacement: 614 long tons (624 t)
- Length: 47.0 m (154.2 ft)
- Beam: 8.2 m (26 ft 11 in)
- Draught: 2.95 m (9 ft 8 in)
- Propulsion: reciprocating steam engine; 2 shafts, 2 boilers; 950 hp (710 kW)
- Speed: 11.0 knots (12.7 mph; 20.4 km/h)
- Range: 60 tons coal
- Complement: 104
- Armament: 1 × 210 mm (8 in) guns; 1 × 120 mm (4.7 in) guns; 2 × 25 mm (0.98 in) Nordenfelt guns

Service record
- Operations: Battle of Weihaiwei; Boxer Rebellion; Siege of Port Arthur

Chōkai (鳥海) was an iron-hulled, steam gunboat, serving in the early Imperial Japanese Navy. She was the second vessel to be completed in the four vessel Maya class, and was named after Mount Chōkai in between Yamagata and Akita Prefectures.

== Background ==
Chōkai was an iron-hulled, two-masted gunboat with a horizontal double expansion reciprocating steam engine with two cylindrical boilers driving two screws. She also had two masts for a schooner sail rig.

Chōkai was laid down at the Ishikawajima-Hirano Shipyards in Tokyo on 1 January 1886 and launched on 20 August 1887. She was completed on 27 December 1888.

== Operational history ==
Chōkai was captained by Lieutenant Commander Kamimura Hikonojō from October 1893 to June 1894. Chōkai saw combat service in the First Sino-Japanese War under the command of Lieutenant Commander Tōgō Masamichi, patrolling between Korea, Dairen and played a role at the Battle of Weihaiwei. On the night of 5 February, Chōkai participated in a night operation with Atago, in which the gunboats made a feint attack on the north entrance to the harbor as a diversion while torpedo boats attacked from the east entrance, sinking the Chinese battleship Dingyuan and damaging the cruiser Laiyuan. After the surrender of China, Atago and Chōkai remained at Weihaihei as part of the Japanese occupation force.

On 21 March 1898, Chōkai was re-designated as a second-class gunboat, and was used for coastal survey and patrol duties. During the Boxer Rebellion, she was assigned to patrol off the Taku Forts.

During the Russo-Japanese War, Chōkai assisted in the Siege of Port Arthur. During the third attempt to sink old freighters in an attempt to block the entrance to Port Arthur harbor, Chōkai was present as one of the escorts. On a shore bombardment mission on 26 May 1904 to support the Japanese Second Army at the Battle of Nanshan (together with the cruiser Tsukushi), Chōkai came under fire, and her captain, Lieutenant Commander Hayashi Michio was killed. He was replaced by Lieutenant Commander Hirose Katsuhiko, the older brother of the famed war-hero Takeo Hirose, who commanded Chōkai through the end of the war, including the Invasion of Sakhalin towards the end of the war.

Chōkai was removed from active combat status on 1 April 1908, and was used as a training vessel at the Sasebo Naval District. She was removed from the navy list and transferred to the Home Ministry on 1 December 1911 for use as a police boat in Kobe Harbor. She was subsequently demilitarized and sold for scrap in 1912.
