= Katsuragi-class corvette =

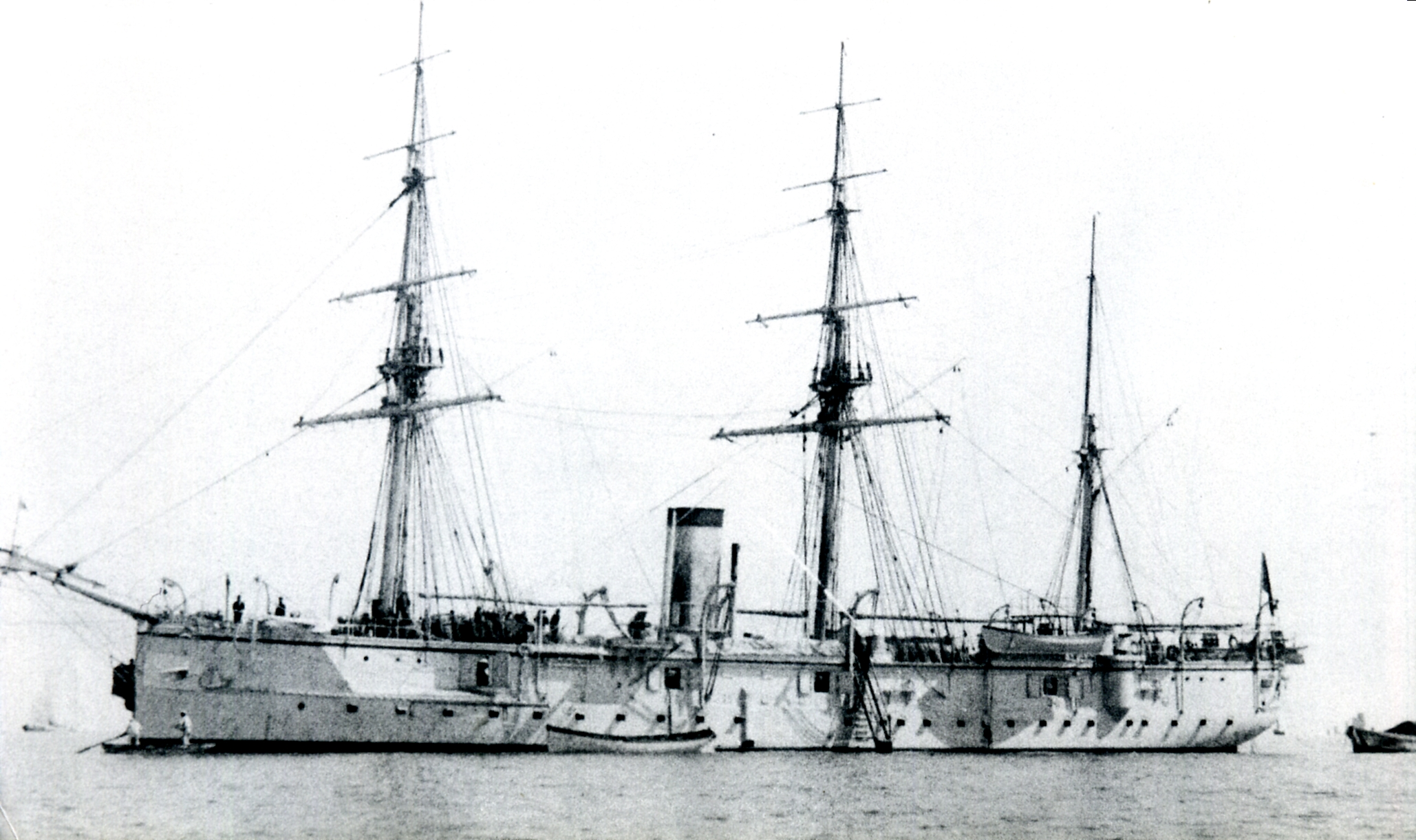
- Katsuragi in 1897

Class overview
- Name: Katsuragi class
- Builders: Yokosuka Shipyards (2); Onohama Shipyards (1)
- Operators: Imperial Japanese Navy
- Built: 1883–1888
- In commission: 1887–1935
- Completed: 3
- Lost: 0
- Scrapped: 1

General characteristics
- Type: Steam corvette
- Displacement: 1,500 t (1,476 long tons)
- Length: 62.78 m (206 ft 0 in)
- Beam: 10.7 m (35 ft 1 in)
- Draft: 4.6 m (15 ft 1 in)
- Installed power: 1,622 ihp (1,210 kW)
- Propulsion: 1 × horizontally mounted reciprocating steam engine; 6 boilers, 2 × screws
- Sail plan: Barque-rigged sloop (3 × masts)
- Speed: 13 kn (24 km/h; 15 mph)
- Capacity: 132 t (146 short tons) coal
- Complement: 231
- Armament: 2 × 170 mm (6.7 in) Krupp breech-loading guns; 5 × 120 mm (4.7 in) Krupp breech-loading guns; 1 × 80 mm (3.1 in) Krupp QF gun; 4 × quadruple 1-inch Nordenfelt guns; 2 × 380 mm (15 in) torpedo tubes

The Katsuragi class (葛城型スループ, Katsuragi-gata suru-pu) was a three-ship class of composite hulled, sail-and-steam corvettes of the early Imperial Japanese Navy.

== Design and description ==
The Katsuragi vessels were designed as iron-ribbed, wooden-hulled, three-masted barque-rigged sloops-of-war, with a basic design based on experience gained in building Kaimon and Tenryū sloops. The planking was a combination of teak and native keyaki wood. The Katsuragi-class ships had an overall length of 61.37 metres (201.3 ft), a beam of 10.76 metres (35.3 ft), and a normal draught of 4.65 metres (15.3 ft). They displaced 1,502 long tons (1,526 t) at normal load. The crew numbered about 231 officers and enlisted men.

Propulsion was by a coal-fired double-expansion reciprocating steam engine with six cylindrical boilers driving a double screw. The engines were rated at 1,600 indicated horsepower (1,200 kW), and designed to reach a top speed of 13 knots (24 km/h; 15 mph).

The Katsuragi-class ships were armed with two Krupp 170 mm (6.7 in) Krupp breech-loading guns, five 120 mm (4.7 in) Krupp breech-loading guns, one 80 mm (3.1 in) Krupp QF gun, four quadruple 1-inch Nordenfelt guns and 380 mm (15 in) torpedo tubes. A major improvement over previous Japanese corvette designs was the use of recessed gun ports, which allowed the two forward guns to fire on a forward arc instead of only on a broadside.

The design for the Katsuragi-class ships was by British-educated Japanese naval architect Sasō Sachū, director of the Yokosuka Naval Arsenal. Two of the three vessels (Katsuragi and Musashi) were built at Yokosuka, and one (Yamato) by built by the private-contractor, Onohama Shipyards in Kobe (a predecessor of Hitachi Zosen Corporation). In late 1900, the ships were extensively refitted, during which time their sail rigging was removed, and armament changed to eight QF 2.5 pdr guns and six quadruple 1-inch Nordenfelt guns. The torpedoes were upgraded from 15 inch to 18-inch torpedo tubes. However, during the Russo-Japanese War, the ships were regarded as obsolete and were assigned as guard ships in ports in the Japanese home islands.

In 1907, the armament was changed again, this time to four 3-inch and two 2.5-inch guns, and the ships were reclassified as survey ships or as a second-class coastal patrol vessels. Katsuragi was removed from the navy list on 11 April 1913, and Musashi on 1 April 1928. Yamato was removed from the navy list 1 April 1935, but survived as a floating prison until the end of World War II.

== Ships ==
Ship	Builder	Laid down	Launched	Completed	Fate
Katsuragi	Yokosuka Naval Arsenal, Japan	18 August 1883	31 March 1885	4 November 1887	Broken up, 4 November 1913
Yamato	Onohama Shipyards, Kobe	23 November 1883	1 May 1885	16 November 1887	decommissioned 1 April 1935 sank in typhoon 18 September 1945
Musashi	Yokosuka Naval Arsenal, Japan	1 October 1884	30 March 1886	9 February 1888	Decommissioned 1 April 1928; Broken up, 4 November 1913
