= Japanese gunboat Maya =

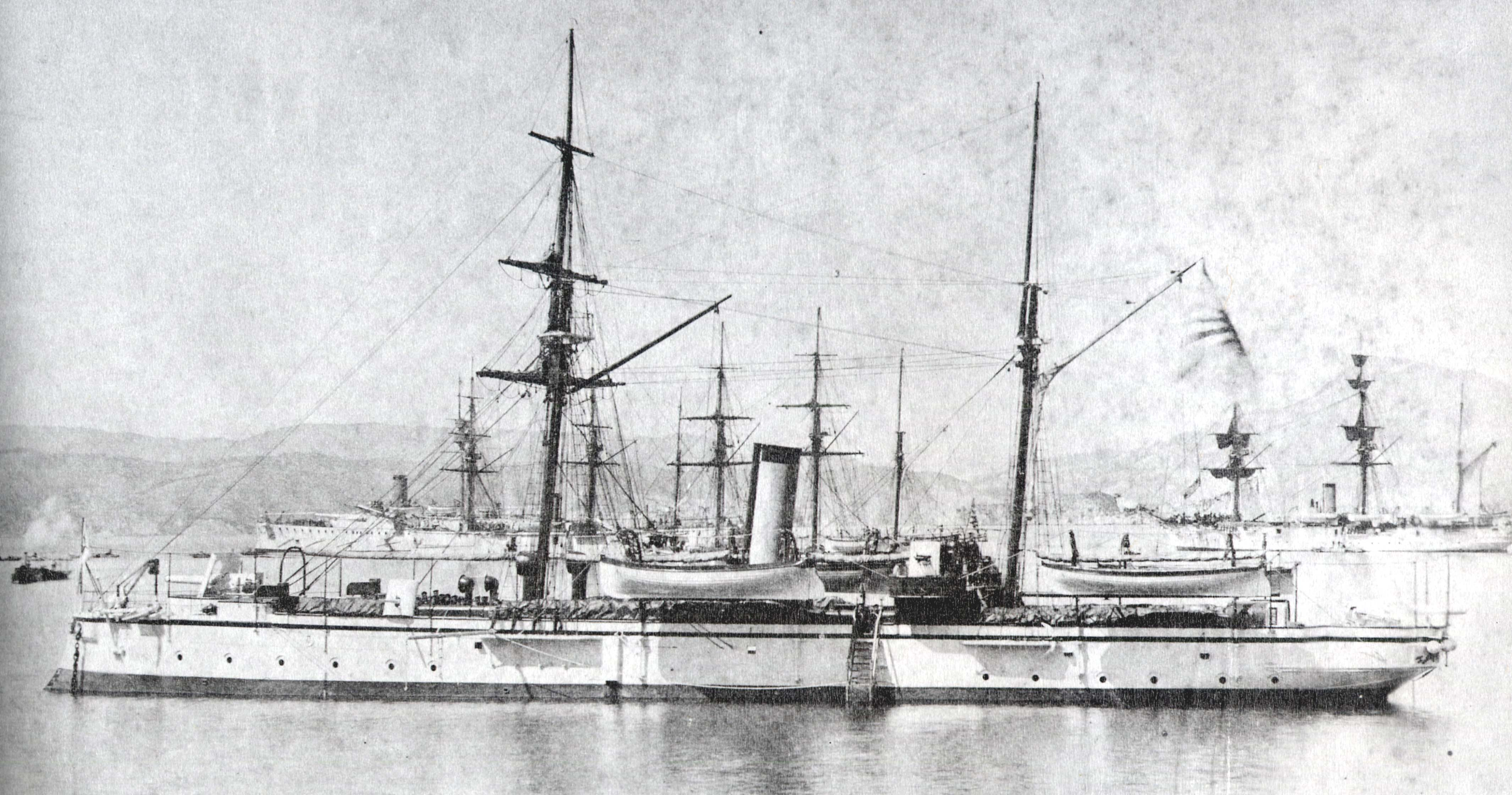
- Japanese gunboat Maya off Kure in 1892

History

Empire of Japan
- Name: Maya
- Ordered: 1883
- Builder: Onohama Shipyards
- Laid down: 1 June 1885
- Launched: 18 August 1886
- Commissioned: 10 January 1888
- Decommissioned: 16 May 1908
- Stricken: 1 December 1911
- Fate: Scrapped 1932

General characteristics
- Class & type: Maya-class gunboat
- Displacement: 614 long tons (624 t)
- Length: 47.0 m (154.2 ft)
- Beam: 8.2 m (26 ft 11 in)
- Draught: 2.95 m (9 ft 8 in)
- Propulsion: reciprocating steam engine; 2 shafts, 2 boilers; 950 hp (710 kW)
- Speed: 11.0 knots (12.7 mph; 20.4 km/h)
- Range: 60 tons coal
- Complement: 104
- Armament: 2 × 150 mm (6 in) Krupp L/22 breech-loading gun; 2 × 1-inch Nordenfelt guns

Service record
- Operations: Siege of Port Arthur

Maya (摩耶) was an iron-hulled, steam gunboat, serving in the early Imperial Japanese Navy. She was the lead vessel in the four vessel Maya class, and was named after Mount Maya in Kobe.

== Background ==
Maya was an iron-ribbed, iron-sheathed, two-masted gunboat with a horizontal double expansion reciprocating steam engine with two cylindrical boilers driving two screws. She also had two masts for a schooner sail rig.

Maya was laid down at the Onohama Shipyards in Kobe on 1 June 1885 and launched on 18 August 1886. She was completed on 20 January 1888.

== Operational history ==
Maya saw combat service in the First Sino-Japanese War of 1894-1895 under the command of Lieutenant Commander Hashimoto Masaaki, patrolling between Korea, Dairen and escorting Japanese transports.

On 21 March 1898, Maya was re-designated as a second-class gunboat, and was used for coastal survey and patrol duties.

During the Russo-Japanese War of 1904-1905, Maya assisted in the Siege of Port Arthur, and also made a sortie up the Yalu River to attack Russian positions, and was part of the Japanese fleet for the invasion of Sakhalin. She was rearmed with four 4.7 in (120 mm) QF guns and two quadruple 1-inch Nordenfelt guns in 1906.

She was removed from active combat status on 16 May 1908, and was used as a training vessel at the Yokosuka Naval District. Maya was removed from the navy list and transferred to the Home Ministry on 1 December 1911 for use as a police boat in Kobe harbor. She was subsequently demilitarized and sold in December 1918 to a commercial trading firm, Ikeda Shoji, who used her as a transport until she was scrapped in 1932.
