= Hirose Takeo =

Imperial Japanese Navy career officer (1868-1904)

- 廣瀨 武夫
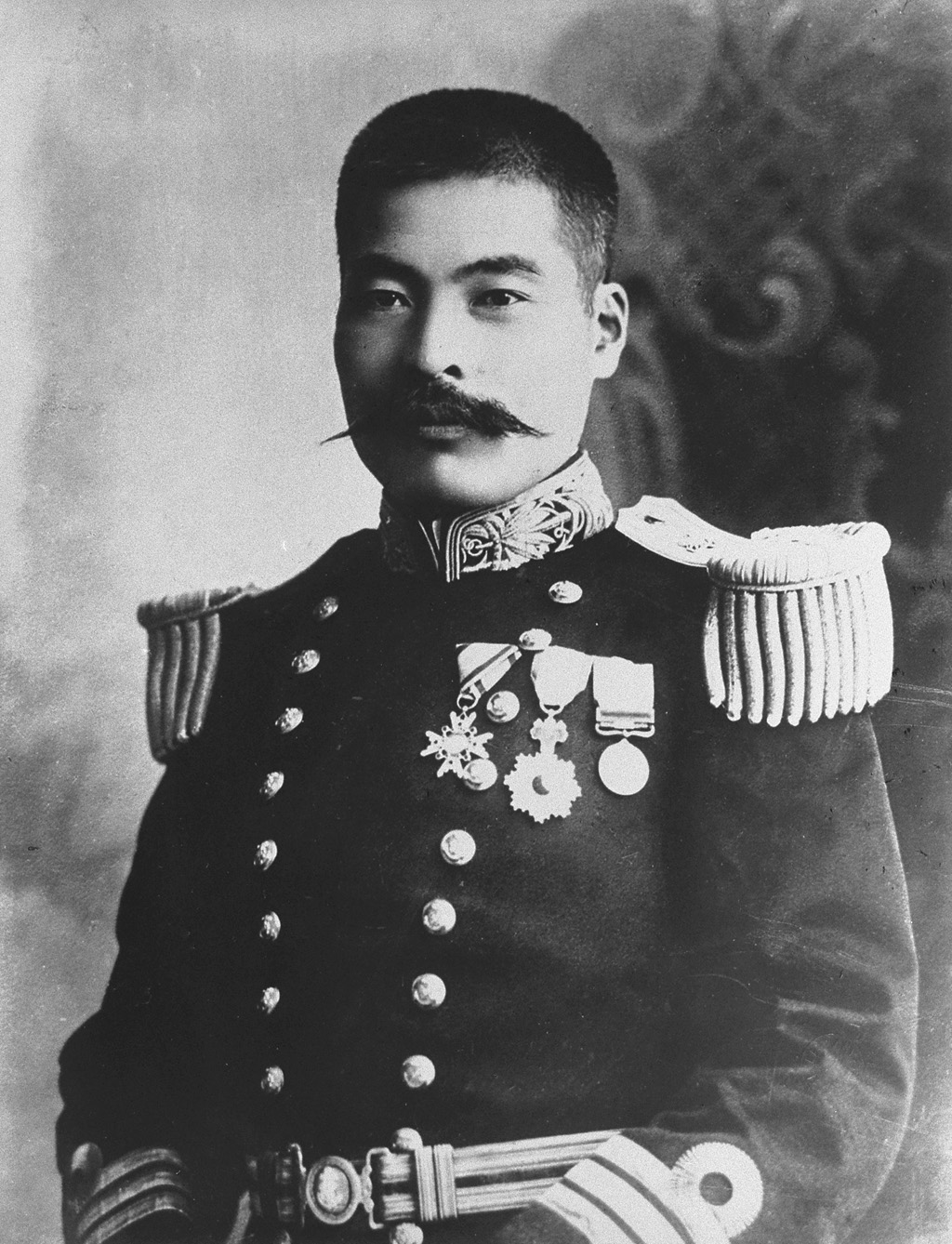
- Born: May 27, 1868; Taketa, Ōita, Japan
- Died: March 27, 1904 (aged 35); Port Arthur, Manchuria
- Cause of death: Killed in action
- Military career
- Allegiance: Empire of Japan
- Branch: Imperial Japanese Navy
- Service years: 1889–1904
- Rank: Commander
- Commands: Fukui Maru
- Conflicts: First Sino-Japanese War; Battle of Yalu River; Russo-Japanese War; Battle of Port Arthur †

Hirose Takeo (廣瀨 武夫, Takeo Hirose; May 27, 1868 – March 27, 1904) was a career officer in the Imperial Japanese Navy. He commanded the cargo vessel Fukui Maru during the Battle of Port Arthur in the Russo-Japanese War. The ship was hit by coastal artillery, and despite being wounded, he was killed while looking for other survivors of the sinking, going down with his ship. His selfless sacrifice elevated him to the status of a deified national hero.

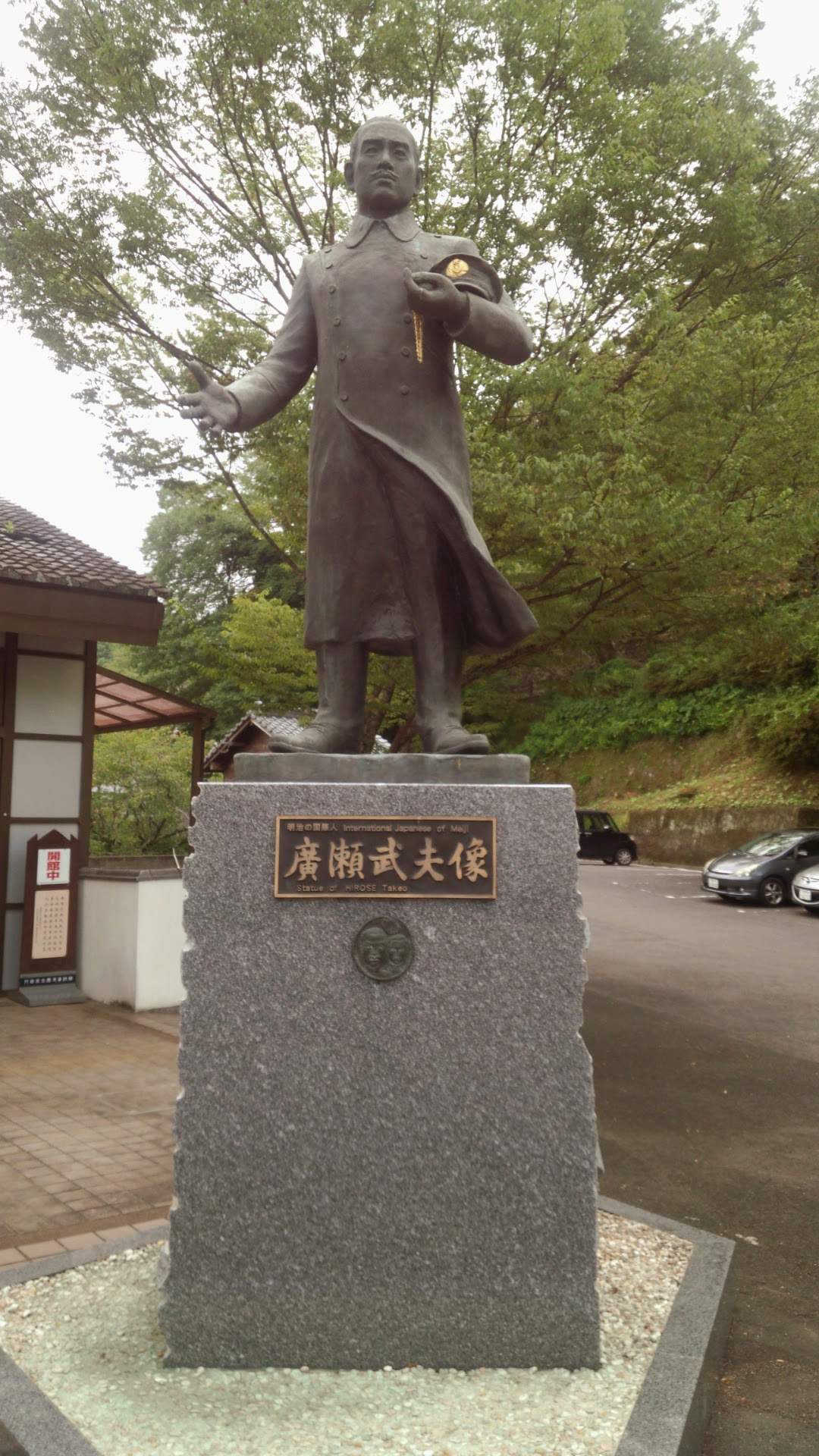
Bronze statue of Lieutenant Colonel Hirose.

== Biography ==
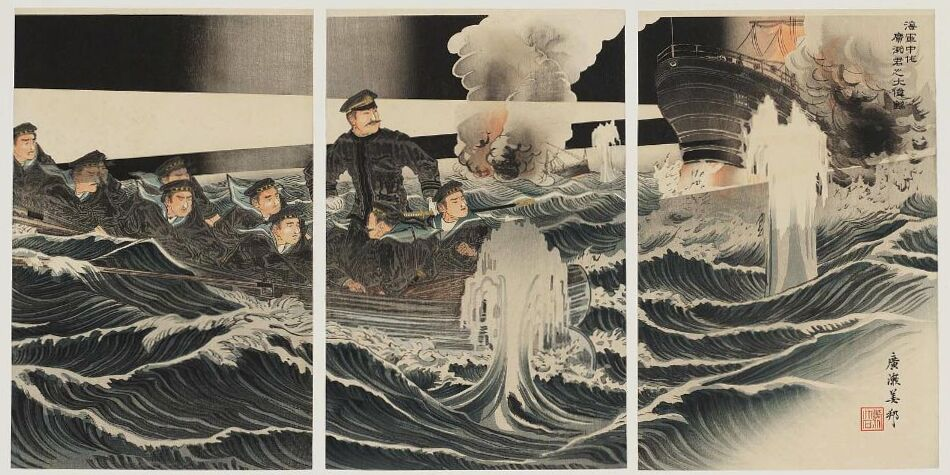
Commemorative print, "Commander Hirose's Great Achievement"

Born in what is now Taketa, Ōita, his father Hirose Shigetake was a judge, while his elder brother Hirose Katsuhiko was a rear admiral. He studied at the Imperial Japanese Naval Academy in Etajima, graduating from the 15th class in 1889. He served aboard the ironclad warship Fusō during the First Sino-Japanese War and saw action at the Battle of Yalu River on September 17, 1894. From 1897 to 1899 Hirose was sent to study in Russia and stayed on as the resident military attaché in St. Petersburg until 1902. During his time as attaché he went on a tour of Germany, France and Great Britain. He was promoted to lieutenant commander in 1900.

When Japan went to war against Russia in the Russo-Japanese War in 1904, Hirose was assigned to the battleship Asahi as torpedo officer. However, during the Battle of Port Arthur he volunteered to command the Fukui Maru, an old cargo vessel which was used as a blockship during the second unsuccessful attempt to blockade the entrance to Port Arthur on the night of March 26. As the ship was about to reach the channel, it was hit by Russian artillery and a torpedo fired by a destroyer Silnyi and sunk. Hirose was fatally wounded while searching for survivors and went down with the ship.

Because of his heroism, he was posthumously promoted to commander, and deified as a "martial spirit" (軍神 gunshin), and a Shinto shrine was built in his honor in Taketa, Oita. A statue of him was also erected outside the Manseibashi Railway Station in Tokyo until 1947.

== Cultural references ==
Song of Commander Hirose was a Monbusho Shoka, or a song authorized by the Ministry of Education, a predecessor of the current Ministry of Education, Culture, Sports, Science and Technology.

Hirose was the subject of the epic historical novel Saka no Ue no Kumo, by author Ryōtarō Shiba. The novel became the basis for the NHK television drama Saka no Ue no Kumo, in which Hirose portrayed by ex-Olympic swimmer and actor Takahiro Fujimoto.

== See also ==
- Tachibana Shūta - the Imperial Japanese Army equivalent to Hirose, who was also deified as a gunshin.
- Ariadna Kovalskaya - Russian woman known for her relationship with Hirose
