= Japanese gunboat Atago =

Maya class steam gunboat

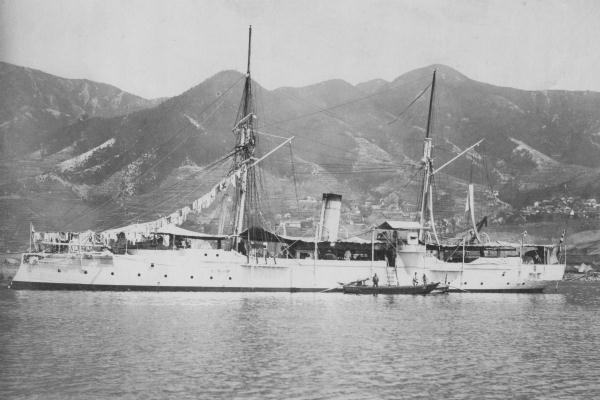
- Atago at Kure, 1897

History

Empire of Japan
- Name: Atago
- Ordered: 1883
- Builder: Yokosuka Naval Arsenal
- Laid down: 17 July 1886
- Launched: 18 June 1887
- Commissioned: 2 March 1889
- Stricken: 15 June 1905
- Fate: Grounded and sank 6 November 1904

General characteristics
- Class & type: Maya-class gunboat
- Displacement: 614 long tons (624 t)
- Length: 47.0 m (154.2 ft)
- Beam: 8.2 m (26 ft 11 in)
- Draught: 2.95 m (9 ft 8 in)
- Propulsion: reciprocating steam engine; 2 shafts, 2 boilers; 950 hp (710 kW)
- Speed: 11.0 knots (12.7 mph; 20.4 km/h)
- Range: 60 tons coal
- Complement: 104
- Armament: 1 × 210 mm (8 in) Krupp L/22 breech-loading gun; 1 × 120 mm (4.7 in) Krupp L/22 breech-loading gun; 2 × 25.4 mm (1.00 in) Nordenfelt guns

Service record
- Operations: Battle of Weihaiwei; Boxer Rebellion; Siege of Port Arthur

Atago (愛宕) was a composite hulled, steam gunboat, serving in the early Imperial Japanese Navy. She was the third vessel to be completed in the four vessel Maya class, and was named after Mount Atago in Kyoto.

== Background ==
Atago was an iron-ribbed, iron-sheathed, two-masted gunboat with a horizontal double expansion reciprocating steam engine with two cylindrical boilers driving two screws. She also had two masts for a schooner sail rig.

Atago was laid down at the Yokosuka Naval Arsenal on 17 July 1886 and launched on 18 June 1887. She was completed on 2 March 1889. To distinguish her from her sister ships, she had a yellow belt painted on her hull.

== Operational history ==
Atago saw combat service in the First Sino-Japanese War of 1894-1895 under the command of Lieutenant Commander Inoue Yoshitomo, patrolling between Korea, Dairen and escorting Japanese transports. During the Battle of Weihaiwei, Atago covered Japanese landing operations on 18 January 1895 (along with Yaeyama and Maya) and shelled Chinese forts on 29 January and 7 February. On the night of 5 February, Atago participated in a night operation with Chōkai, in which the gunboats made a feint attack on the north entrance to the harbor as a diversion while torpedo boats attacked from the east entrance, sinking the Chinese battleship Dingyuan and damaging the cruiser Laiyuan. After the surrender of China, Atago and Chōkai remained at Weihaihei as part of the Japanese occupation force.

On 21 March 1898, Atago was re-designated as a second-class gunboat, and was used for coastal survey and patrol duties. During the Boxer Rebellion, Atago was assigned to patrol off the Taku Forts from June to October 1900 under the command of Commander Heitarō Takenouchi.

During the Russo-Japanese War of 1904–1905, Atago was initially assigned to operations on the Liao River along with the cruiser Tsukushi. She later assisted in the Siege of Port Arthur, and in early October 1904 captured a Chinese junk with military supplies destined for the port. While on patrol outside Port Arthur on 6 November she ran aground due to fog on rocks southwest of the harbor at position 38°24′N 120°55′E, and sank. She was removed the navy list on 15 June 1905.
