= Maya-class gunboat =

Imperial Japanese gunboat class

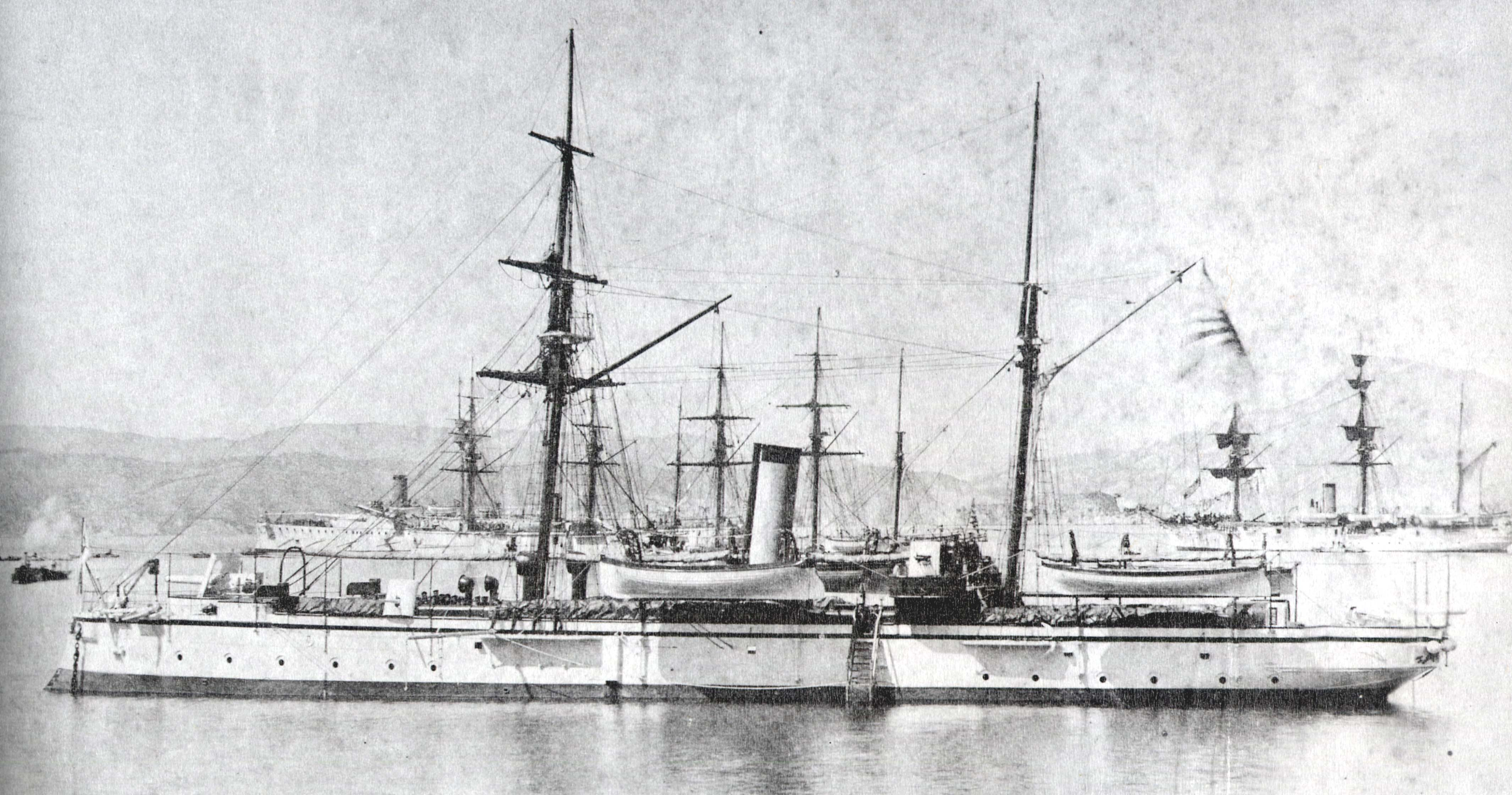
- Japanese gunboat Maya off Kure in 1892

Class overview
- Name: Maya class
- Operators: Imperial Japanese Navy
- Built: 1886-1888
- In commission: 1888-1911
- Completed: 4
- Lost: 1
- Scrapped: 3

General characteristics
- Type: Gunboat
- Displacement: 614 long tons (624 t)
- Length: 47.0 m (154.2 ft)
- Beam: 8.2 m (26 ft 11 in)
- Draught: 2.95 m (9 ft 8 in)
- Installed power: 950 ihp (710 kW)
- Propulsion: 2 × horizontally mounted reciprocating steam engine; 2 boilers, 2 × screws
- Sail plan: Schooner-rigged
- Speed: 10.25 kn (18.98 km/h; 11.80 mph)
- Capacity: 60 t (66 short tons) coal
- Complement: 104
- Armament: 1 × 210 mm (8 in) Krupp L/22 breech-loading gun; 1 × Krupp 120 mm (4.7 in) L/22 breech-loading gun; 2 × quadruple 1-inch Nordenfelt guns

The Maya class (摩耶型砲艦, Maya-gata hōkan) was a four-ship class of gunboats of the early Imperial Japanese Navy.

== Design and description ==
The Maya vessels were Japan’s first iron-hulled gunboats, although only Maya and Chōkai had true iron hulls. Atago had a composite hull construction, whereas Akagi had a steel hull. All four vessels had auxiliary schooner-rigged sails. The Maya-class ships had an overall length of 47.0 metres (154.2 ft), a beam of 8.2 metres (26.9 ft), and a normal draught of 2.95 metres (9.7 ft). They displaced 614 long tons (624 t) at normal load. The crew numbered about 104 officers and enlisted men.

Propulsion was by a coal-fired horizontal double-expansion reciprocating steam engine with two cylindrical boilers driving a double screw. The engines were rated at 614 indicated horsepower (458 kW), and designed to reach a top speed of 10.25 knots (18.98 km/h; 11.80 mph).

The Maya-class ships were initially intended to be armed with one Krupp 210 mm (8 in) Krupp L/22 breech-loading gun, and one Krupp 120 mm (4.7 in) L/22 breech-loading gun, with two quadruple 1-inch Nordenfelt guns as secondary armament. However, each ship later modified to carry different armament in 1906.

Two of the three vessels (Maya and Akagi) were built by the private-contractor, Onohama Shipyards in Kobe (a predecessor of Hitachi Zosen Corporation), and one (Chōkai ) was by built by the private-contractor Ishikawajima-Hirano Shipyards. Atago was built by the government’s Yokosuka Naval Arsenal

All four ships served in the First Sino-Japanese War of 1894-1895. In 1898, the ships were reclassified as second-class gunboats. Atago was lost in combat during the Russo-Japanese War in 1904. Maya and Chōkai were removed from the navy list in 1908 and were subsequently broken up in 1913. Akagi was removed from the navy list in 1911, but survived under civilian ownership until 1953.

== Ships ==
Ship	Builder	Laid down	Launched	Completed	Fate
Maya	Onohama Shipyards, Kobe	5 May 1885	18 August 1886	20 January 1888	Struck 1908, Demilitarized 1911; Broken up, 1932
Chōkai	Ishikawajima-Hirano Shipyards, Tokyo	December 1885	20 September 1887	27 December 1888	Struck 1908, Broken up, 1912
Atago	Yokosuka Naval Arsenal, Yokosuka	July 1886	June 1887	2 March 1889	Sunk in combat 4 November 1904
Akagi	Onohama Shipyards, Kobe	June 1886	August 1888	20 August 1890	Struck 1911, Demilitarized 1912; Broken up, 1953
