= List of Imperial Japanese Navy fleets =

This is a list of fleets of the Imperial Japanese Navy, the navy of the Empire of Japan. This navy existed from 1868 to 1945, when it was replaced by the Japan Maritime Self-Defense Force.

== High rank fleets ==
These fleets were under the command of the Ministry of the Navy, Imperial General Headquarters or Imperial Japanese Navy General Staff.

- Northern Expeditionary Fleet (北伐艦隊, Hokubatsu Kantai)

9 March 1869 => 27 July 1870

- Small Fleet (小艦隊, Shō-Kantai)

28 July 1870 => 17 May 1872

- Medium Fleet (中艦隊, Chū-Kantai)

18 May 1872 => 25 October 1875, divided into Eastern Fleet and Western Fleet on 28 October 1875.
5 September 1876 => 28 December 1885, reorganized to Standing Small-Fleet.

- Eastern Fleet (東部艦隊, Tōbu-Kantai)

28 October 1875 => 4 September 1876, incorporated into Medium Fleet on 5 September 1876.

- Western Fleet (西部艦隊, Seibu-Kantai)

28 October 1875 => 4 September 1876, incorporated into Medium Fleet on 5 September 1876.

- Combined Fleet (聯合艦隊, Rengō Kantai)

18 July 1894 => 15 November 1895
28 December 1903 => 20 December 1905
1 December 1922 => 10 October 1945

- China Area Fleet (支那方面艦隊, Shina Hōmen Kantai)

20 October 1937 => 9 September 1945

- General Escort Command (海上護衛総隊, Kaijō Goei Sōtai)

15 November 1943 => 25 August 1945

== Medium rank fleets ==
These fleets were under the command of a higher rank fleet, and themselves commanded one or more lower rank fleets.

- Southwest Area Fleet (南西方面艦隊, Nansei Hōmen Kantai)

10 April 1942 => 3 September 1945

- Southeast Area Fleet (南東方面艦隊, Nantō Hōmen Kantai)

20 December 1942 => 6 September 1945

- Northeast Area Fleet (北東方面艦隊, Hokutō Hōmen Kantai)

5 August 1943 => 5 December 1944

- 1st Mobile Fleet (第一機動艦隊, Dai-Ichi Kidō Kantai)

1 March 1944 => 15 November 1944

- Central Pacific Area Fleet (中部太平洋方面艦隊, Chūbu Taiheiyō Hōmen Kantai)

4 May 1944 => 18 July 1944

- 10th Area Fleet (第十方面艦隊, Dai-Jū Hōmen Kantai)

5 February 1945 => 12 September 1945

== Lower rank fleets ==
These did not in general have any other fleets under their command.

- Standing Small-Fleet (常備小艦隊, Jōbi Shō-Kantai)

28 December 1885 => 29 July 1889, reorganized to Standing Fleet.

- Standing Fleet (常備艦隊, Jōbi Kantai)

29 July 1889 => 28 December 1903, reorganized to 1st Fleet and 2nd Fleet.

- Guard Fleet (警備艦隊, Keibi Kantai)

13 July 1894 => 19 July 1894, reorganized to Western Sea Fleet.

- Western Sea Fleet (西海艦隊, Saikai Kantai)

19 July 1894 => 15 November 1895

- 1st Fleet (第一艦隊, Dai-Ichi Kantai)

28 December 1903 => 25 February 1944

- 2nd Fleet (第二艦隊, Dai-Ni Kantai)

28 December 1903 => 20 April 1945

- 3rd Fleet (第三艦隊, Dai-San Kantai)

28 December 1903 => 20 December 1905
24 December 1908 => 24 December 1915, reorganized from Southern China Expeditionary Fleet.
25 December 1915 => 1 December 1922
2 February 1932 => 14 November 1939, reorganized to 1st China Expeditionary Fleet on 15 November 1939.
10 April 1941 => 9 March 1942, renamed to 2nd Southern Expeditionary Fleet on 10 March 1942.
14 July 1942 => 15 December 1944, reorganized from 1st Air Fleet.

- 4th Fleet (第四艦隊, Dai-Yon Kantai)

14 June 1905 => 20 December 1905
20 October 1937 => 15 November 1939, reorganized to 3rd China Expeditionary Fleet on 15 November 1939.
15 November 1939 => 15 September 1945

- 5th Fleet (第五艦隊, Dai-Go Kantai)

1 February 1938 => 14 November 1939, reorganized to 2nd China Expeditionary Fleet on 15 November 1939.
25 July 1941 => 5 February 1945

- 6th Fleet (第六艦隊, Dai-Roku Kantai)

15 November 1940 => 15 September 1945

- 7th Fleet (第七艦隊, Dai-Nana Kantai)

15 April 1945 => 15 September 1945

- 8th Fleet (第八艦隊, Dai-Hachi Kantai)

14 July 1942 => 8 September 1945

- 9th Fleet (第九艦隊, Dai-Kyū Kantai)

15 November 1943 => 10 July 1944

- 1st Air Fleet (第一航空艦隊, Dai-Ichi Kōkū Kantai)

10 April 1941 => 14 July 1942, carrier task force.
1 July 1943 => 15 June 1945, reconstituted as the land-based air fleet.

- 2nd Air Fleet (第二航空艦隊, Dai-Ni Kōkū Kantai)

15 June 1944 => 8 January 1945, land-based air fleet.

- 3rd Air Fleet (第三航空艦隊, Dai-San Kōkū Kantai)

10 July 1944 => 15 October 1945, land-based air fleet.

- 5th Air Fleet (第五航空艦隊, Dai-Go Kōkū Kantai)

10 February 1945 => 10 October 1945, land-based air fleet.

- 10th Air Fleet (第十航空艦隊, Dai-Jū Kōkū Kantai)

1 March 1945 => 10 October 1945, land-based air fleet.

- 11th Air Fleet (第十一航空艦隊, Dai-Jūichi Kōkū Kantai)

15 January 1941 => 6 September 1945, land-based air fleet.

- 12th Air Fleet (第十二航空艦隊, Dai-Jūni Kōkū Kantai)

18 May 1943 => 30 November 1945, land-based air fleet.

- 13th Air Fleet (第十三航空艦隊, Dai-Jūsan Kōkū Kantai)

20 September 1943 => 12 September 1945, land-based air fleet.

- 14th Air Fleet (第十四航空艦隊, Dai-Jūyon Kōkū Kantai)

4 March 1944 => 18 July 1944, land-based air fleet.

- Southern Qing Fleet (南清艦隊, Nanshin Kantai)

20 December 1905 => 23 December 1908, reorganized to 3rd Fleet on 24 December 1908.

- China Expeditionary Fleet (遣支艦隊, Kenshi Kantai)

10 August 1918 => 8 August 1919, reorganized from 7th Division on 10 August 1918, reorganized to 1st Expeditionary Fleet on 9 August 1919.

- 1st Expeditionary Fleet (第一遣外艦隊, Dai-Ichi Kengai Kantai)

9 August 1919 => 19 May 1933, reorganized from China Expeditionary Fleet on 9 August 1919, reorganized to 11th Division on 20 May 1933.

- 2nd Expeditionary Fleet (第二遣外艦隊, Dai-Ni Kengai Kantai)

7 February 1917 => 30 November 1918, renamed from 1st Special Task Fleet on 1 December 1918.
16 May 1927 => 20 April 1933

- 1st China Expeditionary Fleet (第一遣支艦隊, Dai-Ichi Kenshi Kantai)

15 November 1939 => 19 August 1943, renamed from 3rd Fleet on 15 November 1939, reorganized Yangtze River Area Base Force on 20 August 1943.

- 2nd China Expeditionary Fleet (第二遣支艦隊, Dai-Ni Kenshi Kantai)

15 November 1939 => 9 September 1945, renamed from 5th Fleet on 15 November 1939.

- 3rd China Expeditionary Fleet (第三遣支艦隊, Dai-San Kenshi Kantai)

15 November 1939 => 9 April 1942, renamed from 4th Fleet on 15 November 1939, reorganized Qingdao Area Special Base Force on 10 April 1942.

- Southern Expeditionary Fleet (南遣艦隊, Nanken Kantai)

31 July 1941 => 2 January 1942, renamed 1st Southern Expeditionary Fleet on 3 January 1942.

- 1st Southern Expeditionary Fleet (第一南遣艦隊, Dai-Ichi Nanken Kantai)

3 January 1942 => 12 September 1945, renamed from Southern Expeditionary Fleet.

- 2nd Southern Expeditionary Fleet (第二南遣艦隊, Dai-Ni Nanken Kantai)

10 March 1942 => 3 September 1945, renamed from 3rd Fleet.

- 3rd Southern Expeditionary Fleet (第三南遣艦隊, Dai-San Nanken Kantai)

3 January 1942 => 3 September 1945

- 4th Southern Expeditionary Fleet (第四南遣艦隊, Dai-Yon Nanken Kantai)

30 November 1943 => 10 March 1945

- 1st Escort Fleet (第一護衛艦隊, Dai-Ichi Goei Kantai)

10 December 1944 => 25 August 1945, reorganized from 1st Escort Squadron.

== Temporary fleets ==
- Special Task Fleet (特務艦隊, Tokumu Kantai)

31 January 1905 => 4 November 1905, Converted merchant cruisers fleet in the Russo-Japanese War.

- Training Fleet (練習艦隊, Renshū Kantai)

20 December 1905 => 20 September 1940, organized and dissolved every year.

- Serving Fleet (接伴艦隊, Seppan Kantai)

6 October 1908 => 25 October 1908, organized for serving the Great White Fleet.

- British Expeditionary Fleet (遣英艦隊, Ken'ei Kantai)

1 April 1911 => 12 November 1911, organized for the Coronation Fleet Review of George V.

- 1st Special Task Fleet (第一特務艦隊, Dai-Ichi Tokumu Kantai)

7 February 1917 => 30 November 1919, fleet for unrestricted submarine warfare in World War I, renamed 2nd Expeditionary Fleet on 1 December 1919.

- 2nd Special Task Fleet (第二特務艦隊, Dai-Ni Tokumu Kantai)

7 February 1917 => 20 July 1919, fleet for unrestricted submarine warfare in World War I.

- 3rd Special Task Fleet (第三特務艦隊, Dai-San Tokumu Kantai)

13 April 1917 => 12 December 1917, fleet for unrestricted submarine warfare in World War I, renamed from 4th Division on 13 April 1917.

== Battle order of Imperial Japanese Navy fleets ==
These diagrams cover only fleets, omitting naval districts, guard districts, divisions, flotillas, squadrons, detachments, and other elements.

- 9 March 1869 (Boshin War)

Ministry of War	Northern Expeditionary Fleet

- 28 July 1870

Ministry of War	Small Fleet (for the Port of Yokohama)
	Small Fleet (for the Port of Hyōgo)
	Small Fleet (for the Port of Nagasaki)

- 18 May 1872

Bureau of Naval Affairs	Medium Fleet

- 28 October 1875

Bureau of Naval Affairs	Eastern Fleet
	Western Fleet

- 28 January 1877 (Satsuma Rebellion)

Bureau of Naval Affairs	Eastern Sea Naval District	Medium Fleet

- 28 December 1885

Bureau of Naval Affairs	Standing Small-Fleet

- 29 July 1889

Bureau of Naval Affairs	Standing Fleet

- 29 July 1894 (First Sino-Japanese War)

Imperial Japanese Navy General Staff	Combined Fleet	Standing Fleet
		Western Sea Fleet

- 6 February 1905 (Battle of Tsushima, Russo-Japanese War)

Imperial Japanese Navy General Staff	Combined Fleet	1st Fleet
		2nd Fleet
		3rd Fleet
Imperial General Headquarters	Special Task Fleet

- 13 April 1917 (World War I)

Imperial Japanese Navy General Staff
Allied Powers

1st Fleet
2nd Fleet
3rd Fleet
1st Special Task Fleet
2nd Special Task Fleet
3rd Special Task Fleet

- 10 October 1937 (Second Sino-Japanese War)

Imperial Japanese Navy General Staff	Combined Fleet	1st Fleet
		2nd Fleet
Imperial General Headquarters	China Area Fleet	3rd Fleet
		4th Fleet

- 10 December 1941 (Pacific War)

Imperial Japanese Navy General Staff
Imperial General Headquarters

Combined Fleet
China Area Fleet

1st Fleet
2nd Fleet
3rd Fleet
4th Fleet
5th Fleet
6th Fleet
1st Air Fleet
11th Air Fleet
Southern Expeditionary Fleet
1st China Expeditionary Fleet
2nd China Expeditionary Fleet
3rd China Expeditionary Fleet

- 1 April 1944 (before the Battle of the Philippine Sea)

Imperial Japanese Navy General Staff	Combined Fleet	6th Fleet
1st Air Fleet
1st Mobile Fleet	2nd Fleet
3rd Fleet
Southwest Area Fleet	1st Southern Expeditionary Fleet
2nd Southern Expeditionary Fleet
3rd Southern Expeditionary Fleet
4th Southern Expeditionary Fleet
9th Fleet
13th Air Fleet
Southeast Area Fleet	8th Fleet
11th Air Fleet
Northeast Area Fleet	5th Fleet
12th Air Fleet
Central Pacific Area Fleet	4th Fleet
14th Air Fleet
Escort Fleet
Imperial General Headquarters	China Area Fleet	2nd China Expeditionary Fleet

- 29 May 1945 (after the Operation Ten-Go)

Imperial General Headquarters	Supreme Headquarters of the Navy	Combined Fleet	4th Fleet
6th Fleet
7th Fleet
1st Air Fleet
3rd Air Fleet
5th Air Fleet
10th Air Fleet
12th Air Fleet
10th Area Fleet	1st Southern Expeditionary Fleet
2nd Southern Expeditionary Fleet
13th Air Fleet
China Area Fleet	2nd China Expeditionary Fleet
Escort Fleet	1st Escort Fleet
Southwest Area Fleet	3rd Southern Expeditionary Fleet
Southeast Area Fleet	8th Fleet
11th Air Fleet

== Bibliography ==
- Naval Minister's Secretariat/Ministry of the Navy (stored at Japan Center for Asian Historical Records (JACAR), National Archives of Japan)
  - Monograph: Year of 1900 - Extract of naval war history of Qing Incident, each volume.
  - Fleet boat division organization and warship torpedo boat deployment, each volume.
  - Vessels boat service list, each volume.
- Senshi Sōsho each volume, Asagumo Simbun, Tōkyō, Japan.
- Rekishi Dokuhon, Special issue No. 33 Overview of admirals of the Imperial Japanese Navy, Shin-Jinbutsuōraisha, Tōkyō, Japan, 1999.
- The Japanese Modern Historical Manuscripts Association, Organizations, structures and personnel affairs of the Imperial Japanese Army & Navy, University of Tōkyō Press, Tōkyō, Japan, 1971, ISBN 978-4-13-036009-8.
- The Maru Special series each volume, "Ushio Shobō"., Tōkyō, Japan.
- Ships of the World series each volume, "Kaijinsha"., Tōkyō, Japan.
- Seiki Sakamoto and Hideki Fukukawa (joint authorship), Encyclopedia of organizations of the Imperial Japanese Navy, Fuyōs Sobō Shuppan, Tōkyō, Japan, 2003, ISBN 4-8295-0330-0.
