= Sasō Sachū =

Vice Admiral Sasō Sachū
- 佐双 左仲
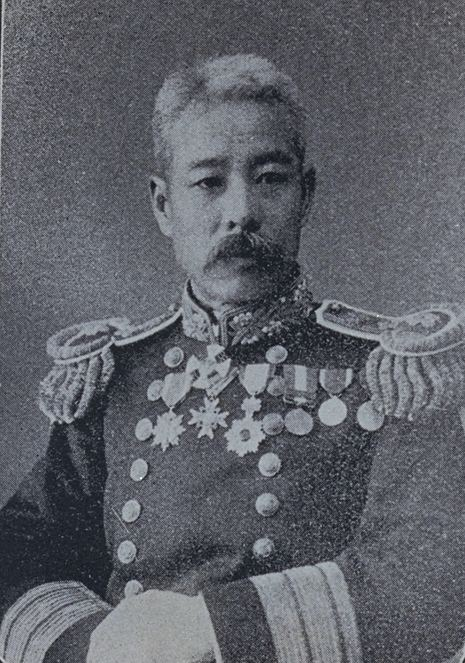
- Sasō Sachū c. 1899
- Born: June 2, 1852; Kanazawa Domain, Japan
- Died: November 9, 1905 (aged 53)
- Alma mater: Imperial Japanese Naval Academy
- Relatives: Horio Jirobei (father)
- Military career
- Allegiance: Empire of Japan
- Branch: Imperial Japanese Navy
- Rank: Vice Admiral
- Commands: Yokosuka Naval Arsenal
- Awards: Honorary doctorate of engineering

Sasō Sachū (佐双 左仲; June 2, 1852 – November 9, 1905) was a Japanese engineer and naval architect of the Meiji period and a career officer in the Imperial Japanese Navy.

== Biography ==
Sasō was born in Kanazawa Domain (present day Kanazawa, Ishikawa) as the fourth son of Horio Jirobei, a samurai in the service of the Maeda clan, and was adopted at an early age by the Sasō family. In 1869, he entered the predecessor to the Imperial Japanese Naval Academy, and from 1871 to 1878 was sent to England for further studies. After his return to Japan in January 1879, he was made deputy general manager of the Shipbuilding Division within the Ministry of the Navy. He subsequently travelled to Europe to visit shipyards, and was eventually promoted to commandant of the Yokosuka Naval Arsenal and other posts within the Navy Ministry, rising to the position of Vice Admiral. He was awarded an honorary doctorate of engineering in 1899.

== Reference and further reading ==
- Cobbing, Andrew (2013). The Japanese Discovery of Victorian Britain. London: Routledge. ISBN 978-1-873410-81-3.
- Evans, David C.; Peattie, Mark R. (1997). Kaigun: Strategy, Tactics, and Technology in the Imperial Japanese Navy, 1887-1941. Annapolis, MD: Naval Institute Press. ISBN 0-87021-192-7.
- O'Brien, Phillips Payson (2013). Technology and Naval Combat in the Twentieth Century and Beyond. London: Routledge. ISBN 978-0-7146-5125-5.
