= Japanese corvette Kaimon =

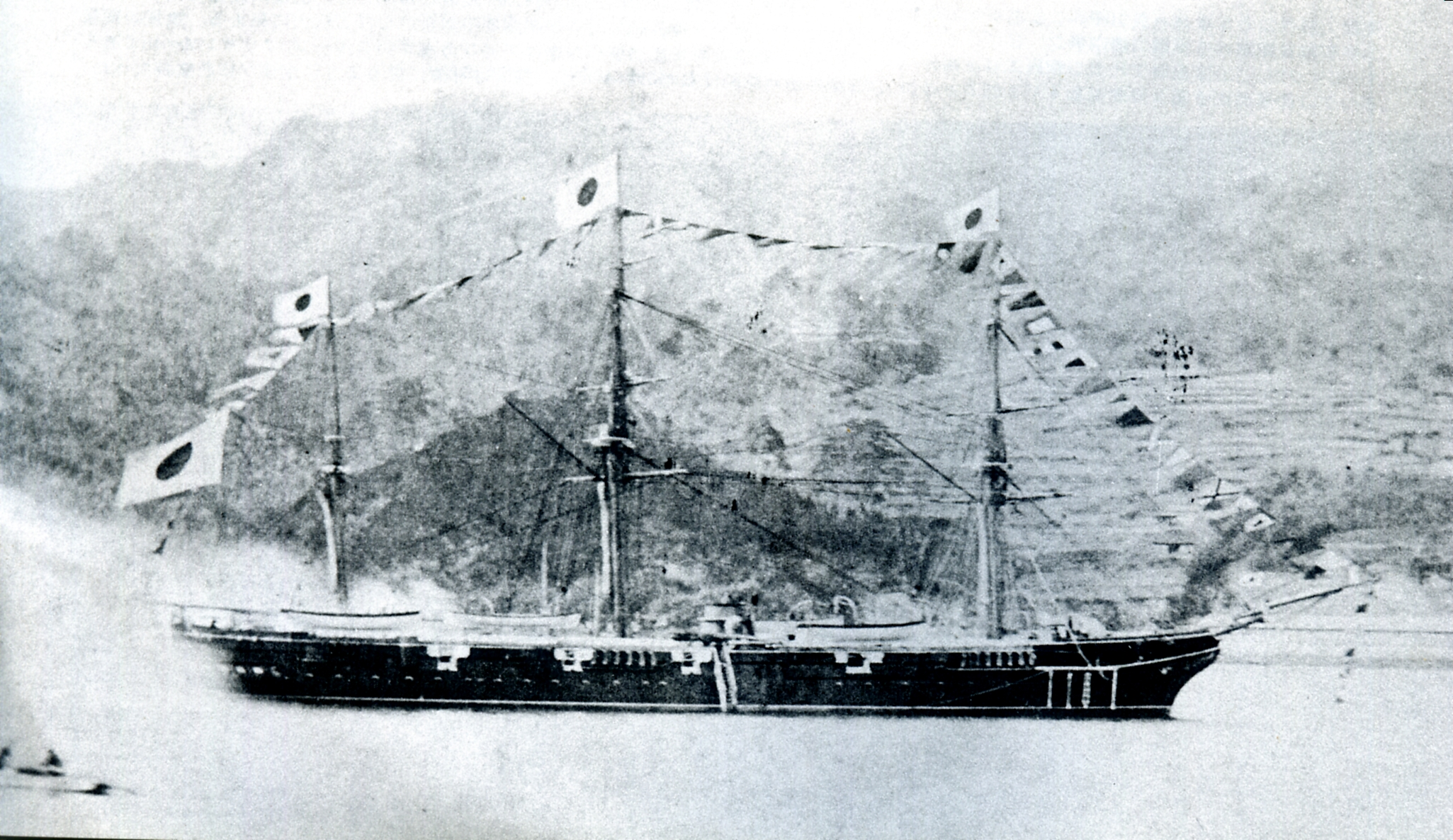
- Japanese armed sloop Kaimon 1886-1887

History

Empire of Japan
- Name: Kaimon
- Ordered: 1877 Fiscal Year
- Builder: Yokosuka Naval Arsenal, Japan
- Laid down: 1 September 1877
- Launched: 28 August 1882
- Commissioned: 13 March 1884
- Stricken: 21 May 1905
- Fate: Mined off Port Arthur 5 July 1904

General characteristics
- Type: Steam corvette
- Displacement: 1,358 long tons (1,380 t)
- Length: 64.68 m (212 ft 2 in)
- Beam: 10.9 m (35 ft 9 in)
- Draft: 5.2 m (17 ft 1 in)
- Propulsion: Horizontally-mounted reciprocating engine, 1,267 hp (945 kW); 4 boilers; 1 shaft
- Sail plan: bark-rigged sloop
- Speed: 12 knots (14 mph; 22 km/h)
- Range: 256 tons coal
- Complement: 210
- Armament: 1 × 170 mm (6.7 in) Krupp breech-loading guns; 6 × 120 mm (4.7 in) Krupp guns; 1 × 80 mm (3.1 in) gun; 4 × 25 mm (1 in) quadruple Nordenfelt guns; 1 × 11.5 mm (0.45 in) quadruple Nordenfelt guns

Kaimon (海門, Sea Gate) was a sail-and-steam corvette of the early Imperial Japanese Navy. Although the name Kaimon translates to "sea gate", the ship was named for Mount Kaimon, although written with different kanji, located in Kagoshima prefecture.

== Background ==
Kaimon was a three-masted bark-rigged sloop-of-war with a coal-fired double expansion reciprocating steam engine with four boilers driving a single screw. She was laid down at the Yokosuka Naval Arsenal on 1 September 1877, launched on 28 August 1882 and commissioned on 13 March 1884. Her construction required over six years, due to numerous technical issues and problems with funding.

The design of Kaimon was almost identical to the corvette Tenryū, completed a year later at the Yokosuka Naval Arsenal. Both ships were designed by French foreign advisors to the early Meiji government in the employ of the Yokosuka Naval Arsenal. During her launching ceremony, a flock of white doves (the traditional messengers of the war god Hachiman) was released, setting a precedent for all future launchings of Japanese warships. Her first captain was Lieutenant Commander Tsuboi Kōzō.

== Operational history ==
Kaimon saw combat service in the First Sino-Japanese War, at the landings of Japanese forces at Chemulpo in Korea, and subsequently at the Battle of Yalu River under the command of Lieutenant Commander Sakurai Kikunozo. She also served with the Japanese task force that supported the invasion of Taiwan in 1895.

On 21 March 1898, Kaimon was re-designated as a third-class coastal defense ship, and was used for coastal survey and patrol duties.

During the Russo-Japanese War, Kaimon was assigned to patrol duties between the Korean Peninsula and Tsushima Strait. She was also used as a transport. She struck a naval mine on 5 July 1904, off Port Arthur (38°50′N 121°50′E), and sunk with the loss of her captain and 22 crewmen. She was struck from the navy list on 21 May 1905.
