= Japanese corvette Tenryū =

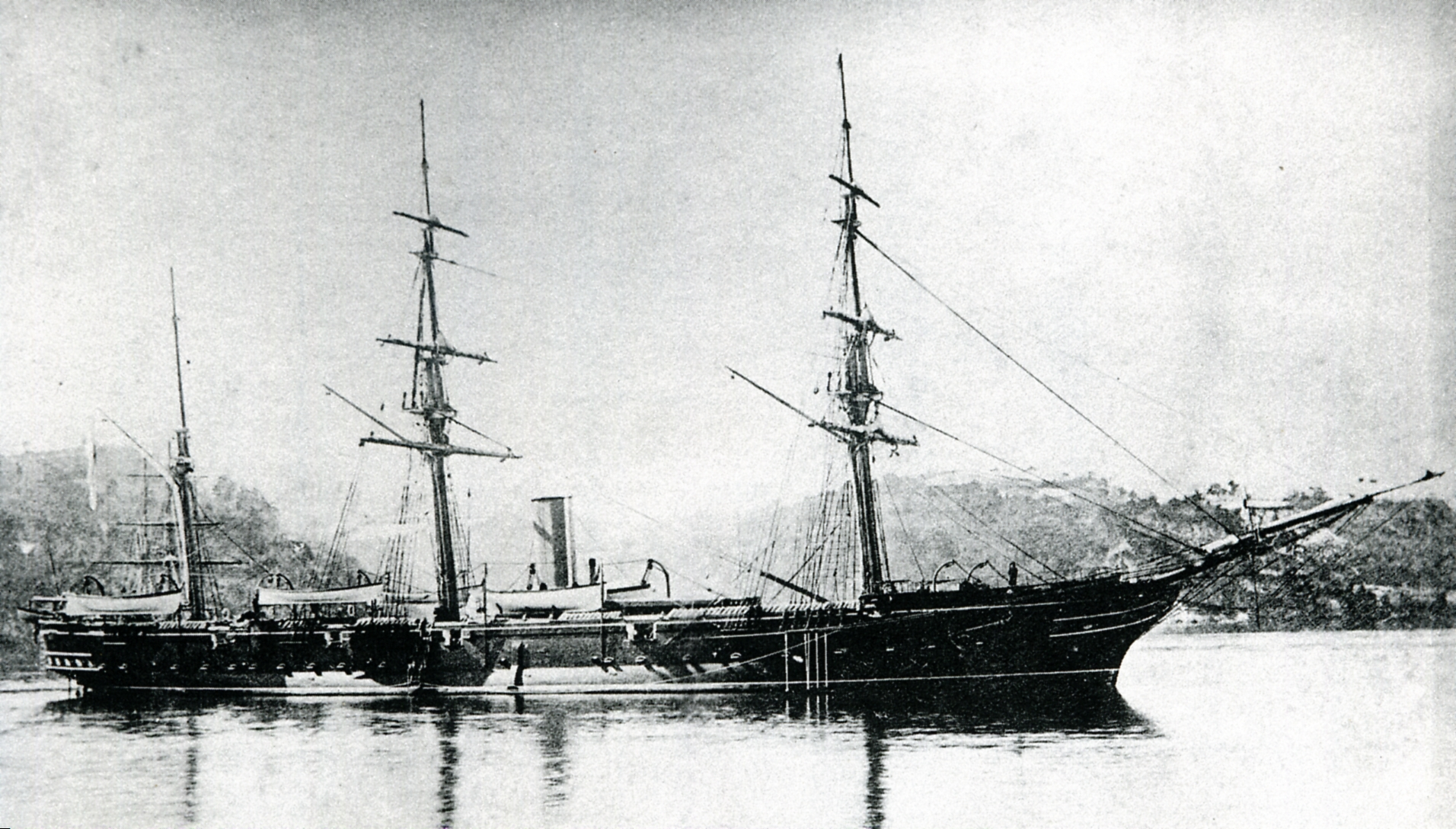
- Japanese armed sloop Tenryū

History

Empire of Japan
- Name: Tenryū
- Ordered: 1877 Fiscal Year
- Builder: Yokosuka Naval Arsenal, Japan
- Laid down: 9 February 1878
- Launched: 18 August 1883
- Commissioned: 5 March 1885
- Stricken: 21 December 1911
- Fate: Scrapped 1912

General characteristics
- Type: Steam corvette
- Displacement: 1,547 long tons (1,572 t)
- Length: 67.4 m (221 ft 2 in)
- Beam: 9.8 m (32 ft 2 in)
- Draft: 5 m (16 ft 5 in)
- Propulsion: Horizontally-mounted reciprocating engine, 1,260 hp (940 kW); 4 boilers; 1 shaft
- Sail plan: Barque-rigged sloop
- Speed: 12 knots (14 mph; 22 km/h)
- Range: 256 tons coal
- Complement: 210
- Armament: 1 × 170 mm (6.7 in) Krupp breech-loading gun; 1 × 150 mm (5.9 in) Krupp breech-loading gun; 4 × 120 mm (4.7 in) guns; 1 × 75 mm (3 in) gun; 4 × 25 mm (0.98 in) quadruple Nordenfelt guns

Tenryū (天龍, Heavenly Dragon) was a sail-and-steam corvette of the early Imperial Japanese Navy. Tenryū was named after the Tenryū River in Shizuoka and Nagano Prefectures.

== Background ==
Tenryū was designed as an iron-ribbed, wooden-hulled, three-masted bark-rigged sloop with a coal-fired double expansion reciprocating steam engine with four boilers driving a single screw. She was laid down at the Yokosuka Naval Arsenal on 9 February 1878, launched on 18 August 1883 and commissioned on 5 March 1885.

Tenryū was based on the design of Kaimon, laid down a year earlier, except slightly larger in displacement and with slightly heavier weaponry. Both ships were designed by French foreign advisors to the early Meiji government in the employ of the Yokosuka Naval Arsenal. As with Kaimon, construction took much longer than initially anticipated, and she required over seven years to complete. However, even after launching, numerous issues needed to be addressed, including a problem with stability that required the addition of bulges to the hull.

== Operational history ==
Tenryū saw combat service in the First Sino-Japanese War, at the Battle of Lushunkou and subsequently at the Battle of Yalu River.

On 21 March 1898, Tenryū was designated a third-class coastal defense ship, and was used for coastal patrol duties. She caught fire in November 1897, and required extensive repairs.

During the Russo-Japanese War, Tenryū was based as a guard ship at Kobe port. After the war, on 20 October 1906, she was transferred to the Maizuru Naval District, where she served as a utility and training vessel. Tenryū was removed from the navy list on 21 December 1911, and sold for scrap on 20 October 1912.
