= Onohama Shipyards =

Japanese shibuilder

Coordinates: 34°41′30″N 135°12′33″E

Onohama Shipyards (小野浜造船所, Onohama Zōsenjo) was one of the first modern commercial shipyards in Japan, and was active in the early Meiji period. It was located in what is now part of Kobe, Japan.

== History ==
Onohama Shipyards was established by Edward Charles Kirby, a British expatriate merchant during late Bakumatsu period and early Meiji period Japan. Kirby came to Japan in 1865, as soon as the country ended its national isolation policy and was opened to foreign trade, and established a chandlery, Kirby & Co in the foreign settlement at Yokohama. He later opened a branch in Kobe.

In 1869, together with two British partners, Robert Huggin and John Taylor, he established the Kobe Iron Works on the Ikuta River about a mile from the foreign settlement, which had an iron foundry, blacksmiths, and a deepwater dock.

In 1878, Kirby bought out his partners and established the Onohama Shipyards, bringing his brother Alfred from Karachi as engineering director. The company engaged in repair work, marine salvage, and built small vessels. In 1882, the company launched Japan's first commercial iron-ribbed steamship, the Dai-ichi Taiko Maru (第一太湖丸), which operated on Lake Biwa. The success of this venture led to a contract from the Imperial Japanese Navy to construct the second of the Katsuragi-class corvettes, the Yamato. However, due to problems with financing, and delays in completion of Yamato caused when suppliers in the UK went on strike, Kirby faced foreclosure on a 50,000 Mexican dollar loan from the Hong Kong & Shanghai Bank, and committed suicide in 1883.

After Kirby's death, the company survived under Japanese government receivership, coming under the control of the Kure Naval Arsenal in 1890. Louis-Émile Bertin, the French naval engineer and senior foreign advisor to the Meiji government and director of the Yokosuka Naval Arsenal recommended that the shipyard concentrate on the production of torpedo boats. In 1893, the name “Onohama Shipyards” was dropped, and the facility as designated a branch of the Kure Naval Arsenal until it was closed in 1895.
