= Guadalcanal campaign =

U.S. military campaign in World War II

- Part of the Solomon Islands campaign of the Pacific Theater of World War II
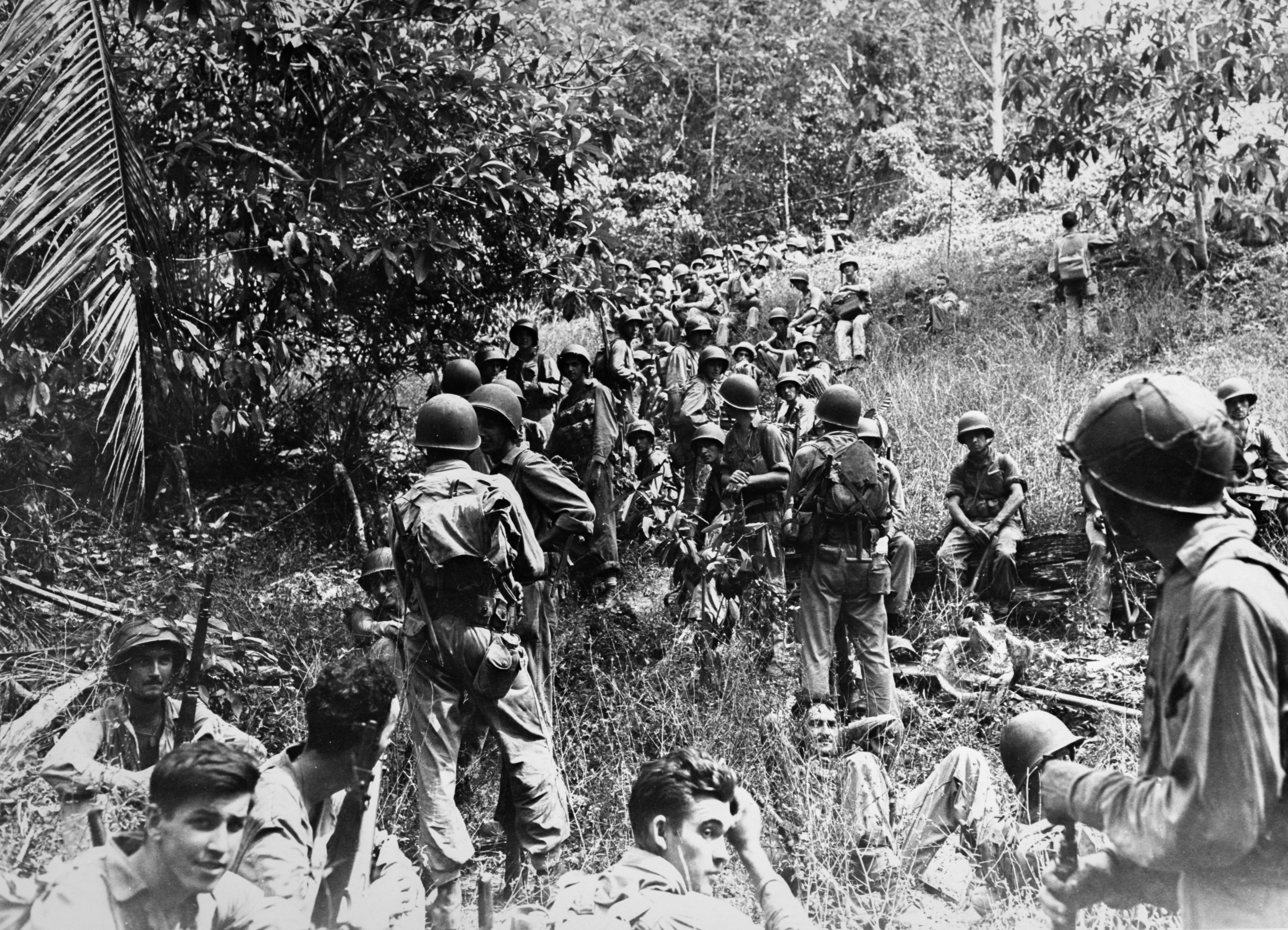
- United States Marines rest in the field during the Guadalcanal campaign.
Date	7 August 1942–9 February 1943 (6 months and 2 days)
Location	Guadalcanal, British Solomon Islands; 9°26′44″S 160°01′13″E
Result	Allied victory

Belligerents
United States; Australia; United Kingdom • (British Solomon Islands) Solomon Islands • Fiji • Tonga; New Zealand	Japan

Commanders and leaders
U.S. Navy: Chester W. Nimitz; Robert L. Ghormley; William F. Halsey Jr. Richmond K. Turner; Frank J. Fletcher; U.S. Marine Corps: Alexander A. Vandegrift U.S. Army: Alexander M. Patch	Imperial Japanese Navy: Isoroku Yamamoto; Chūichi Nagumo; Nobutake Kondō; Nishizō Tsukahara; Jinichi Kusaka; Imperial Japanese Army: Hitoshi Imamura; Harukichi Hyakutake

Units involved
See order of battle	See order of battle

Strength
60,000+ men (ground forces)	36,200 men (ground forces)

Casualties and losses
7,100 killed 7,789+ wounded 4 captured 29 ships lost including 2 fleet carriers, 6 heavy cruisers, 2 light cruisers and 17 destroyers. 615 aircraft lost	Army: 19,200 dead, of whom 8,500 were killed in combat 1,000 captured 38 ships lost including 1 light carrier, 2 battleships, 3 heavy cruisers, 1 light cruiser and 11 destroyers. 683 aircraft lost 10,652 evacuated

The Guadalcanal campaign, also known as the Battle of Guadalcanal and codenamed Operation Watchtower by the United States, was an Allied offensive against forces of the Empire of Japan in the Solomon Islands during the Pacific Theater of World War II. It was fought between 7 August 1942 and 9 February 1943, and involved major land and naval battles on and surrounding the island of Guadalcanal. It was the first major Allied land offensive against Japan during the war.

In summer 1942, the Allies decided to mount major offensives in New Guinea and the Solomon Islands with the objectives of defending sea lines to Australia and eventually attacking the major Japanese base at Rabaul on New Britain. The Guadalcanal operation was under the command of Robert L. Ghormley, reporting to Chester W. Nimitz, while the Japanese defense consisted of the Combined Fleet under Isoroku Yamamoto and the Seventeenth Army under Harukishi Hyakutake.

On 7 August 1942, Allied forces, predominantly U.S. Marines, landed on Guadalcanal, Tulagi, and Florida Island in the southern Solomon Islands. The Japanese defenders, who had occupied the islands since May 1942, offered little initial resistance, but the capture of Guadalcanal soon turned into a lengthy campaign as both sides added reinforcements. The Allies captured and completed Henderson Field on Guadalcanal and established a defense perimeter. The Japanese made several attempts to retake the airfield, including in mid-September and in late October. The campaign also involved major naval battles, including the Battles of Savo Island, the Eastern Solomons, Cape Esperance, and the Santa Cruz Islands, culminating in a decisive Allied victory at the Naval Battle of Guadalcanal in mid-November. Further engagements took place at the Battle of Tassafaronga and Battle of Rennell Island. In December, the Japanese decided to abandon Guadalcanal to focus on the defense of the other Solomon Islands, and evacuated their last forces by 9 February 1943.

The campaign followed the successful Allied defensive actions at the Battle of the Coral Sea and the Battle of Midway in May and June 1942. Along with the battles at Milne Bay and Buna–Gona on New Guinea, the Guadalcanal campaign marked the Allies' transition from defensive operations to offensive ones, and effectively allowed them to seize the strategic initiative in the Pacific theater from the Japanese. The campaign was followed by other major Allied offensives in the Pacific, most notably: the Solomon Islands campaign, New Guinea campaign, the Gilbert and Marshall Islands campaign, the Mariana and Palau Islands campaign, the Philippines campaign of 1944 to 1945, and the Volcano and Ryukyu Islands campaign prior to the surrender of Japan in August 1945.

== Background ==
=== Strategic considerations ===
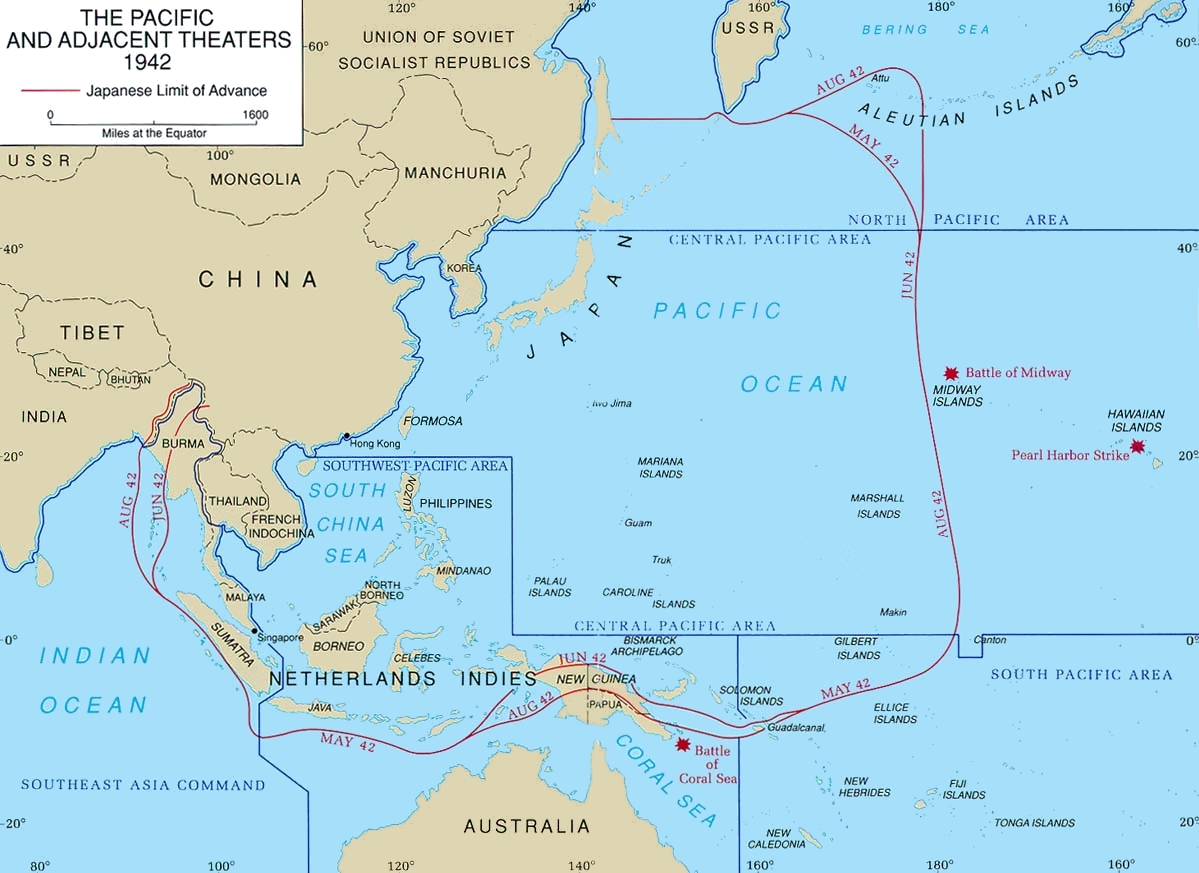
Japanese control of the western Pacific area between May and August 1942. Guadalcanal is located in the lower right center of the map.

On 7 December 1941, Japanese forces attacked the United States Pacific Fleet at Pearl Harbor, Hawaii. The attack killed almost 2,500 and crippled much of the U.S. battleship fleet, precipitating formal declarations of war between the two nations the next day. The initial goals of the Japanese leadership were to neutralize the U.S. Navy, seize territories rich in natural resources, and establish strategic military bases with which to defend Japan's empire in the Pacific Ocean and Asia. Initially, Japanese forces captured the Philippines, Thailand, Malaya, Singapore, Burma, the Dutch East Indies, Wake Island, Gilbert Islands, New Britain and Guam. The U.S. was joined in the war against Japan by several of the Allied powers, including the British Empire and the Dutch government-in-exile, both of which had also been attacked by Japan.

The Japanese made two attempts to continue their offensive and extend their outer defensive perimeter in the south and central Pacific to a point at which they could threaten Australia, Hawaii, and the U.S. west coast. The first offensive was thwarted in the naval Battle of the Coral Sea, which was a tactical stalemate but a strategic Allied victory in that it checked Japan's expansion across the Pacific for the first time: it was the Allies' first major victory against the Japanese and significantly reduced the offensive capability of Japan's carrier forces.

However, the battle did not temper Japan's audacious offensive military posture for several crucial months, with Japanese forces attempting a failed attack on Port Moresby over the Kokoda track. The second major Japanese offensive was stopped at the Battle of Midway. Both sides suffered significant losses in carrier aircraft and aircrew during these engagements. Crucially, while the Americans were able to reconstitute their naval air strength in relatively short order, Japanese limitations in industrial and pilot training capacity meant combat losses rapidly outpaced replacement men and matériel. These strategic victories allowed the Allies to transition to a more offensive stance in the Pacific theater, and attempt to seize the strategic initiative from Japan.

The Allies chose the Solomon Islands (a protectorate of the United Kingdom), specifically the southern islands of Guadalcanal, Tulagi and Florida Island, as their first target, designated Task One (codename Pestilence), with the initial objectives of occupying the Santa Cruz Islands (codename Huddle), Tulagi (codename Watchtower), and "adjacent positions". Guadalcanal (codename Cactus), which eventually became the focus of the operation, was not even mentioned in the early directive, and only later took on the operation name Watchtower. Tulagi, although small, had a large natural harbor that was ideal for a float-plane base; Florida Island also had to be taken, as it dominated Tulagi. Guadalcanal, much larger than the other two islands and located to the south across the soon-to-be-named Ironbottom Sound, was added when it was discovered the Japanese were constructing an airbase there.

The Imperial Japanese Navy (IJN) had occupied Tulagi in May 1942 and had constructed a seaplane base nearby. Allied concern grew when, in early July, the IJN began constructing a large airfield at Lunga Point on nearby Guadalcanal. From such a base, Japanese long-range bombers could threaten the sea lines of communication and maritime trade and transportation routes from the west coast of the Americas to the populous east coast of Australia. By August, the Japanese had about 900 naval troops on Tulagi and nearby islands, and 2,800 personnel (including 2,200 Korean forced laborers and trustees, as well as Japanese construction specialists) on Guadalcanal. These bases were meant to protect Japan's major naval base at Rabaul, threaten Allied supply and communication lines, and establish a staging area for a planned offensive against Fiji, New Caledonia and Samoa (Operation FS). The Japanese planned to deploy 45 fighters and 60 bombers to Guadalcanal. In the overall strategy for 1942, these aircraft would provide ground-based air cover for Japanese naval forces advancing farther into the South Pacific.

The Allied plan to invade the southern Solomons was conceived by U.S. Admiral Ernest King, Commander in Chief, United States Fleet. He proposed the offensive in order to deny the use of the islands to the Japanese as bases from which the supply routes between the United States and Australia could be threatened, and to use them as starting points for further Allied offensives in the South Pacific. With U.S. President Franklin D. Roosevelt's tacit consent, King also advocated for an invasion of Guadalcanal. Due to the Roosevelt administration's support for Great Britain's proposal that priority be given to defeating Germany before Japan, Allied commanders in Pacific theater had to compete for personnel and resources with the European theater.

An early obstacle was the desire of both the U.S. Army and the Roosevelt administration to initiate offensive action in Europe prior to a large-scale operation in the Pacific. In addition, it was initially unclear who would command the campaign: Tulagi lay in the area under the command of General Douglas MacArthur, whereas the Santa Cruz Islands lay in Admiral Chester W. Nimitz's Pacific Ocean Area, which would also supply almost all Allied offensive forces that would be staged, supplied and covered from that area. Both problems were overcome, and the Chief of Staff of the U.S. Army, General George C. Marshall, gave the operation his full support, despite MacArthur's command being unable to directly assist in the operation and the U.S. Navy taking full operational responsibility. As a result, and in order to preserve the unity of command, the boundary between MacArthur's South West Pacific Area and Nimitz's Pacific Ocean Area was shifted 60 miles (97 km) to 360 miles (580 km) to the west, effective from 1 August 1942.

Chief of Staff to the Commander in Chief William D. Leahy established two goals for 1942–1943: first, that Guadalcanal would be taken, in conjunction with an Allied offensive in New Guinea under MacArthur; and second, that the Admiralty Islands and Bismarck Archipelago, including the major Japanese base at Rabaul, would be captured as well. The directive held that the eventual goal was the American reconquest of the Philippines, from which American forces had been evicted in early 1942. The U.S. Joint Chiefs of Staff created the South Pacific theater, with Vice Admiral Robert L. Ghormley taking command on 19 June, to direct the offensive in the Solomons. Nimitz, based at Pearl Harbor, was designated as overall Allied commander-in-chief for Allied forces in the Pacific.

=== Task force ===
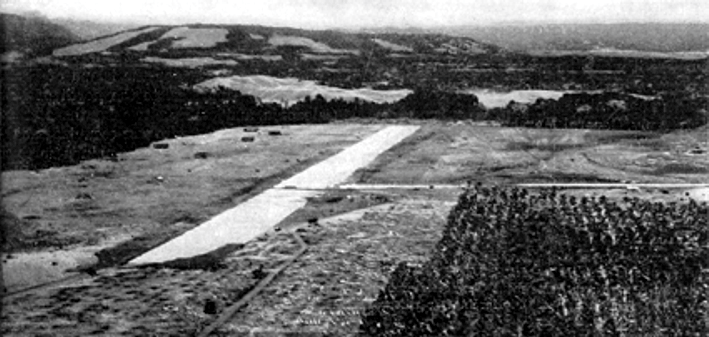
The airfield at Lunga Point on Guadalcanal under construction by Japanese and conscripted Korean laborers in July 1942

In preparation for the offensive in the Pacific in May 1942, U.S. Marine Major General Alexander Vandegrift was ordered to move his 1st Marine Division from the United States to New Zealand. Other Allied land, naval and air units were sent to establish or reinforce bases in Fiji, Samoa, New Hebrides and New Caledonia.

The island of Espiritu Santo, in the New Hebrides, was selected as the headquarters and primary staging ground for the offensive, codenamed Operation Watchtower, with the commencement date set for 7 August. At first, only the seizure of Tulagi and the Santa Cruz Islands was planned, omitting a landing on Guadalcanal. After Allied reconnaissance discovered Japanese airfield construction efforts on Guadalcanal, its capture was added to the plan, and planned landings on the Santa Cruz islands were (eventually) abandoned. The Japanese were aware, via signals intelligence, of the large-scale movement of Allied forces in the South Pacific Area, but concluded that the Allies were reinforcing either Australia or Port Moresby on the southern coast of New Guinea.

The Watchtower force, numbering 75 warships and transports (including vessels from the U.S. and Australia), assembled near Fiji on 26 July and conducted a single rehearsal landing prior to leaving for Guadalcanal on 31 July. The commander of the Allied expeditionary force was U.S. Vice Admiral Frank Fletcher, Commander of Task Force 16 (whose flag was on the aircraft carrier USS Saratoga). Commanding the amphibious forces was U.S. Rear Admiral Richmond K. Turner. Vandegrift led the 16,000 Allied (primarily U.S. Marine) infantry earmarked for the amphibious landings. The troops sent to Guadalcanal were fresh from military training, armed with legacy bolt-action M1903 Springfield rifles and a meager 10-day supply of ammunition. Because of the need to get the troops into battle quickly, the Allied planners had reduced their supplies from 90 days to only 60. The men of the 1st Marine Division began referring to the coming battle as "Operation Shoestring".

== Events ==
=== Landings ===
Routes of Allied amphibious forces for landings on Guadalcanal and Tulagi, 7 August 1942

Poor weather conditions allowed the Allied expeditionary force to arrive unseen by the Japanese on the night of 6 August and morning of 7 August, taking the defenders by surprise. This is occasionally referred to as the "Midnight Raid on Guadalcanal". A Japanese patrol aircraft from Tulagi had searched the general area that the Allied invasion fleet was moving through, but was unable to spot the Allied fleet due to severe storms and heavy clouds. The landing force split into two groups, with one group assaulting Guadalcanal and the other Tulagi, Florida, and other nearby islands. Allied warships bombarded the invasion beaches, while U.S. carrier aircraft bombed Japanese positions on the target islands and destroyed 15 Japanese seaplanes at their base near Tulagi.

Tulagi and two nearby small islands, Gavutu and Tanambogo, were assaulted by 3,000 U.S. Marines under the command of Brigadier General William Rupertus. The 886 IJN personnel manning the naval and seaplane bases on the three islands fiercely resisted the Marine landings. With some difficulty, the Marines secured all three islands: Tulagi on 8 August, and Gavutu and Tanambogo by 9 August. The Japanese defenders were killed almost to the last man, and the Marines suffered 248 casualties.

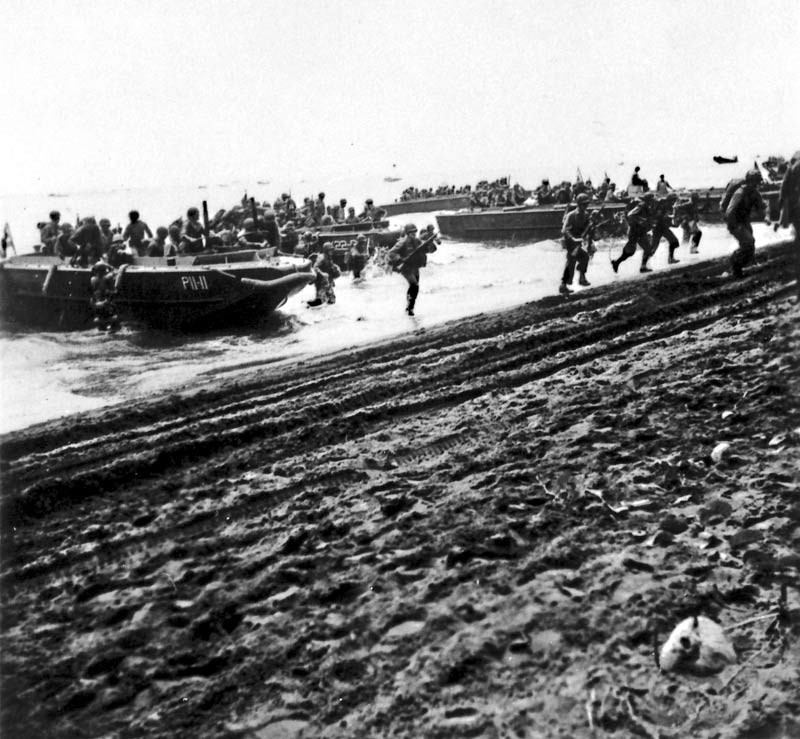
U.S. Marines debark from LCP(L)s onto Guadalcanal on 7 August 1942.

In contrast to Tulagi, Gavutu, and Tanambogo, the landings on Guadalcanal encountered much less resistance. At 09:10 on 7 August, Vandegrift and 11,000 U.S. Marines came ashore on Guadalcanal between Koli Point and Lunga Point. Advancing towards Lunga Point, they encountered scant Japanese resistance and secured the airfield by 16:00 on 8 August. The Japanese naval construction units and combat troops, under the command of Captain Kanae Monzen, had panicked after coming under naval bombardment and aerial bombing, and had abandoned the airfield and fled about 3 miles (5 km) west to the Matanikau River and Point Cruz area. Japanese troops left behind food, supplies, intact construction equipment and vehicles, and 13 dead at the airfield and surrounding area.

During the landing operations on 7 and 8 August, Rabaul-based Japanese naval aircraft under the command of Yamada Sadayoshi attacked the Allied amphibious forces several times, setting on fire the transport USS George F. Elliott, which sank two days later, and heavily damaging the destroyer USS Jarvis. Over the course of two days of air attacks, Japanese air units lost 36 aircraft, while the U.S. lost 19 (including 14 carrier aircraft), both in combat and to accidents.

After these aerial clashes, Fletcher became concerned about the unexpectedly high losses to his carrier fighter aircraft strength, anxious about the threat to his carriers from further Japanese air attacks, and worried about his ships' remaining fuel supply. Fletcher withdrew from the Solomon Islands area with his carrier task force on the evening of 8 August. In response to the loss of carrier-based air cover, Turner decided to withdraw his ships from Guadalcanal, even though less than half of the supplies and heavy equipment needed by the troops ashore had been unloaded. Turner planned to unload as many supplies as possible on Guadalcanal and Tulagi throughout the night of 8 August, and then depart with his ships early on 9 August.

=== Battle of Savo Island ===
While the transports continued to unload on the night of 8–9 August, two groups of screening Allied cruisers and destroyers, under the command of British Rear Admiral Victor Crutchley, were surprised and defeated by a Japanese force of seven cruisers and one destroyer from the 8th Fleet based at Rabaul and Kavieng, commanded by Japanese Vice Admiral Gunichi Mikawa. The 8th Fleet had been sighted at least five times over the course of the previous days, both by Allied submarines and aerial reconnaissance, but a combination of misidentification of ships and the Allied leadership's dismissal of Japanese night fighting capability contributed to an air of complacence and ignorance among the Allied surface fleet that proved disastrous. Japanese submarine activity and air attack continued to be the main source of concern to Turner and his staff, not the threat of Japanese surface action.

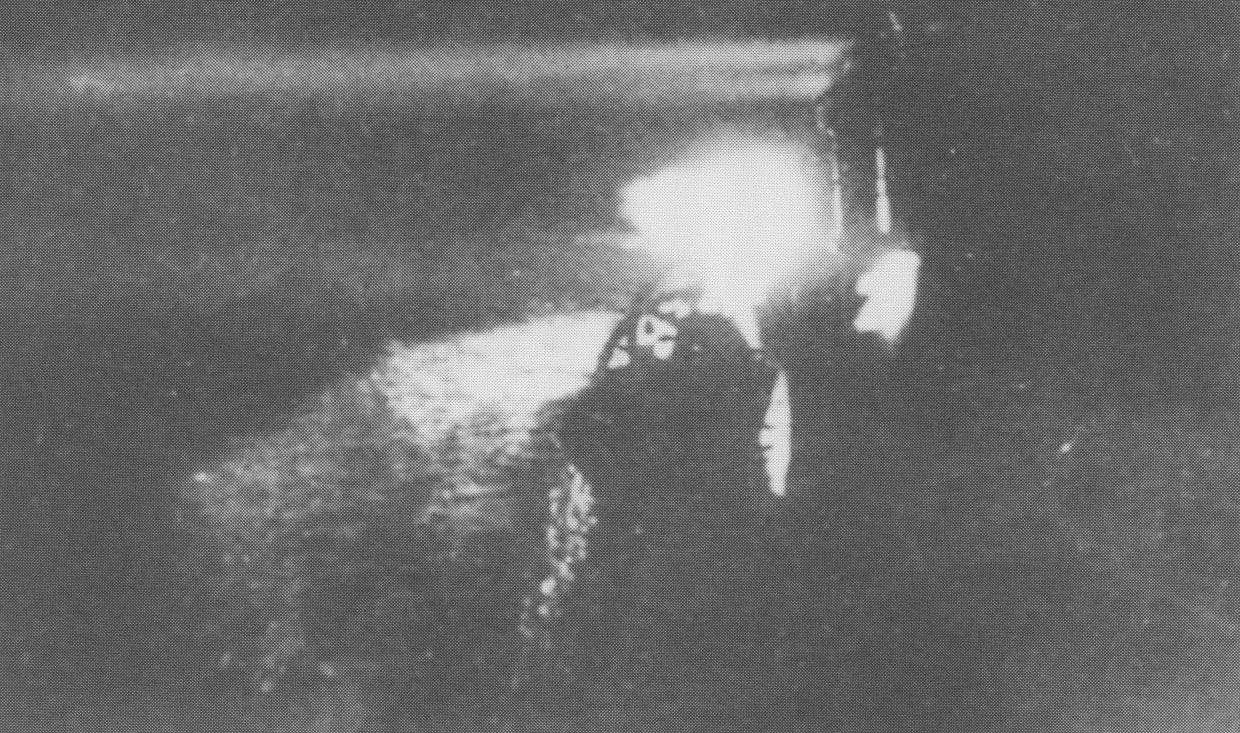
Japanese cruiser Yūbari shines searchlights towards the northern force during the night battle around Savo Island on 9 August 1942. In the course of this action 4 allied cruisers were sunk and one was heavily damaged with no Japanese ships lost, and the transport fleet was left exposed to further attack.

As a result, during the Battle of Savo Island on the night of 9 August, Mikawa's force was able to surprise and sink one Australian and three American cruisers, as well as damage another American cruiser and two destroyers. The Japanese suffered only moderate damage to one cruiser. Despite this success, Mikawa was unaware that Fletcher was preparing to withdraw with the U.S. aircraft carriers, and immediately retired to Rabaul without attempting to attack the (now defenseless) Allied transports, fearing daytime air attacks on his vessels once the cover of darkness had been lost. Bereft of his carrier air cover and concerned about Japanese submarine and surface attacks against his degraded fleet, Turner withdrew his badly mauled naval forces from the area on the evening of 9 August. This left the Marines ashore understrength (as some transports in the Allied fleet had retreated without disembarking all of their troops), and without much of their heavy equipment and provisions. Mikawa's decision not to attempt to destroy the Allied transport ships when he had the opportunity proved to be a crucial strategic mistake.

=== Initial ground operations ===
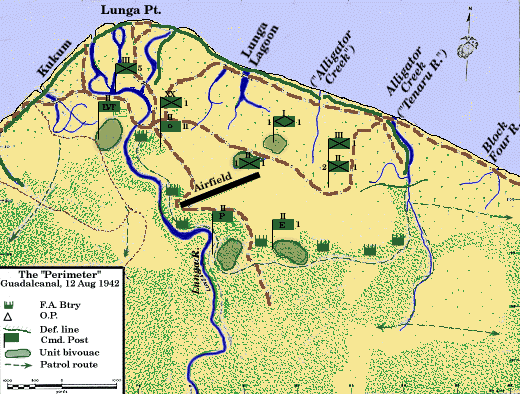
Initial U.S. Marine defenses around the airstrip at Lunga Point, Guadalcanal, 12 August 1942

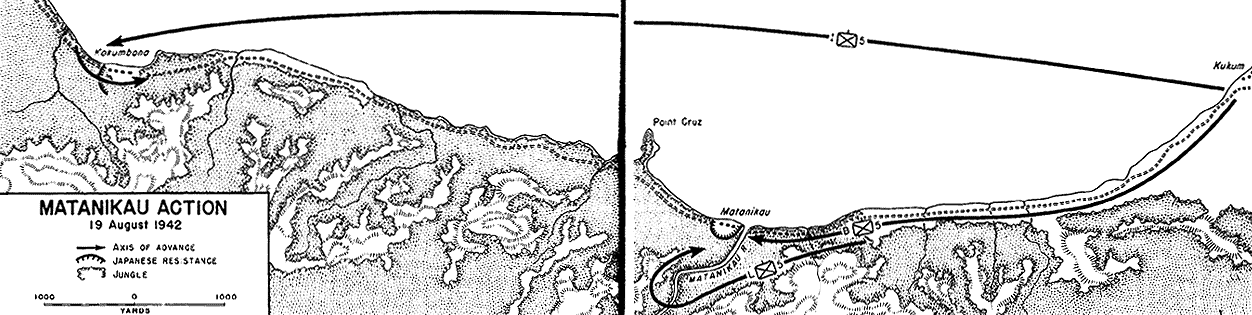
Map showing the U.S. Marine attacks west of the Matanikau River on 19 August

The 11,000 Marines on Guadalcanal initially concentrated on forming a loose defensive perimeter centered around Lunga Point and the airfield, moving what supplies had been brought ashore within the perimeter, and completing the construction of the airfield. Over four days of intense effort, the supplies were moved from the landing beaches to dispersed dumps within the defensive perimeter. Work began on the airfield immediately, mainly using captured Japanese equipment. On 12 August the airfield was named Henderson Field after Lofton R. Henderson, a Marine aviator who was killed during the Battle of Midway. By 18 August the airfield was ready for operation. Five days' worth of food had been landed from the transports, which, along with captured Japanese provisions, gave the Marines a total of 14 days' supply of food. To conserve supplies, the troops were limited to two meals per day.

Allied troops suffered from a severe strain of dysentery soon after the landings, with one in five Marines afflicted by mid-August. Although some of the Korean construction workers surrendered to the Marines, most of the remaining Japanese and Korean personnel gathered just west of the Lunga perimeter on the west bank of the Matanikau River and subsisted mainly on coconuts. A Japanese naval outpost was also located at Taivu Point, about 35 kilometers (22 mi) east of the Lunga perimeter. On 8 August, a Japanese destroyer from Rabaul delivered 113 naval reinforcement troops to the Matanikau position.

=== Goettge patrol ===
On the evening of 12 August, a 25-man U.S. Marine patrol, led by Division D-2 Lieutenant Colonel Frank Goettge and primarily consisting of intelligence personnel, landed by boat west of the U.S. Marine Lunga perimeter, east of Point Cruz and west of the Japanese perimeter at Matanikau River, on a reconnaissance mission with a secondary objective of contacting a group of Japanese troops that U.S. forces believed might be willing to surrender. Soon after the patrol landed, a nearby platoon of Japanese naval troops attacked it and almost completely wiped it out, with only three swimming back to the Marine base.

In response, on 19 August, Vandegrift sent three companies of the U.S. 5th Marine Regiment to attack the Japanese troop concentration west of the Matanikau. One company attacked across the sandbar at the mouth of the Matanikau River while another crossed the river 1,000 meters (1,100 yd) inland and attacked the Japanese forces located in Matanikau village. The third landed by boat further west and attacked Kokumbuna village. After briefly occupying the two villages, the three Marine companies returned to the Lunga perimeter, having killed about 65 Japanese soldiers while losing four Marines. This action, sometimes referred to as the "First Battle of the Matanikau", was the first of several major actions around the Matanikau River during the campaign.

On 20 August, the escort carrier USS Long Island delivered a squadron of 19 Grumman F4F Wildcats and a squadron of 12 Douglas SBD Dauntlesses to Henderson Field. The airfield's rudimentary nature meant that carrier aircraft, designed for rough landings on flight decks at sea, were more suited for use on Henderson Field than ground-based planes. The aircraft based at Henderson became known as the "Cactus Air Force", after the Allied codename for Guadalcanal, Cactus. The Marine fighters went into action the next day, which also saw the first of what would become almost-daily Japanese bomber air raids on the airfield. On 22 August five U.S. Army Bell P-400 Airacobras and their pilots arrived at Henderson Field.

=== Battle of the Tenaru ===
Dead Japanese soldiers on the sandbar at the mouth of Alligator Creek, Guadalcanal after the Battle of the Tenaru

In response to the Allied landings, the Japanese Imperial General Headquarters assigned the task of retaking Guadalcanal to the Imperial Japanese Army's (IJA) 17th Army, a corps-sized command based at Rabaul under the command of Lieutenant General Harukichi Hyakutake. The army was to be supported by Japanese naval units, including the Combined Fleet under the command of Isoroku Yamamoto, which was headquartered at Truk. The 17th Army, at that time heavily involved in the Japanese campaign in New Guinea, had only a few units available to allocate to Guadalcanal. Of these, the 35th Infantry Brigade under Major General Kiyotake Kawaguchi was at Palau, the 4th (Aoba) Infantry Regiment under Major General Yumio Nasu was in the Philippines and the 28th (Ichiki) Infantry Regiment, under the command of Colonel Kiyonao Ichiki, was berthed on transport ships near Guam. These units began to move towards Guadalcanal via Truk and Rabaul immediately, but Ichiki's regiment, being the closest, arrived in the area first. A "First Element" of Ichiki's unit, consisting of about 917 soldiers, was landed by IJN destroyers at Taivu Point, east of the Lunga perimeter, after midnight on 19 August, then conducted a 9-mile (14 km) night march west toward the Marine perimeter.

Underestimating the strength of Allied forces on Guadalcanal, Ichiki's unit conducted a nighttime frontal assault on Marine positions at Alligator Creek (often called the "Ilu River" on U.S. Marine maps) on the east side of the Lunga perimeter in the early morning hours of 21 August. Jacob Vouza, a Solomon Islands Coastwatcher scout, warned the Americans of the impending attack minutes before it started; the attack was defeated with heavy losses to the Japanese. After daybreak, the Marine units counterattacked Ichiki's surviving troops, killing many more of them. The dead included Ichiki; it has been reported that he died by seppuku after realizing the magnitude of his defeat. In total, 789 of the original 917 members of the Ichiki Regiment's First Element were killed in the battle. About 30 survived the battle and joined Ichiki's rear guard of about 100, and these 128 Japanese returned to Taivu Point, notified 17th Army headquarters of their defeat and awaited further reinforcements and orders from Rabaul.

=== Battle of the Eastern Solomons ===
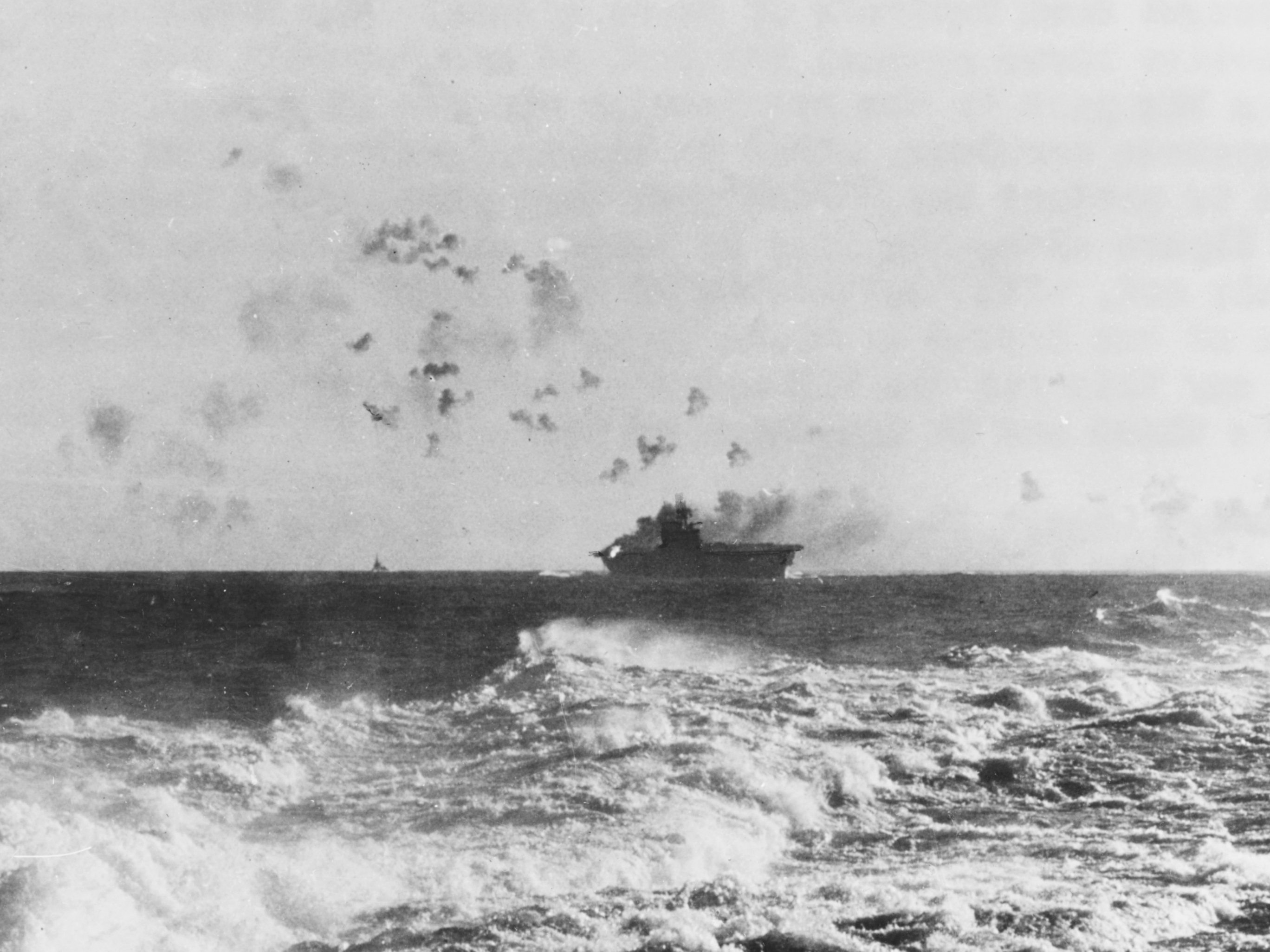
The carrier USS Enterprise under aerial attack during the Battle of the Eastern Solomons

As the Tenaru battle was ending, more Japanese reinforcements were already on their way to Guadalcanal. Yamamoto had organized an extremely powerful naval expeditionary force, with the goal of destroying any American fleet units in the Solomons and subsequently eliminating Allied ground forces at Henderson Field. This force sortied from Truk on 23 August. Several other IJN units carrying reinforcements and supplies, and ships tasked with naval bombardment of the island, sortied from both Truk and Rabaul. Three slow transport ships departed from Truk on 16 August, carrying the remaining 1,400 soldiers from Ichiki's (28th) Infantry Regiment plus 500 naval marines from the 5th Yokosuka Special Naval Landing Force. The transports were guarded by 13 warships commanded by Japanese Rear Admiral Raizō Tanaka, who planned to land the troops on Guadalcanal on 24 August. To cover the landing of these troops and provide support for the operation to retake Henderson Field from Allied forces, Yamamoto directed Chūichi Nagumo to sortie with a carrier force from Truk on 21 August and sail toward the southern Solomon Islands. Nagumo's force included three carriers and 30 other warships. Yamamoto would send the light carrier Ryūjō ahead of the rest of the Japanese fleet to act as bait to draw the American aircraft into combat. The aircraft from the two fleet carriers would then attack the American fleet while it lacked air cover.

Simultaneously, the U.S. carrier task force under Fletcher approached Guadalcanal to counter the Japanese offensive efforts. On 24 August, the two carrier forces located and launched strikes against each other. The Japanese had two fleet carriers, the Shōkaku and Zuikaku, as well as the light carrier Ryūjō, with a total of 177 carrier-based aircraft. The American forces had two carriers, the Saratoga and Enterprise, and their 176 aircraft. The Japanese light carrier Ryūjō, offered as bait to Allied naval aircraft, was hit by several 1,000-pound (450 kg) bombs and an aerial torpedo; she was abandoned by her crew and sank that night. The two Japanese fleet carriers were not attacked, but Japanese aircraft successfully attacked Enterprise, badly damaging her flight deck. Both fleets subsequently retreated from the area. The Japanese lost the Ryūjō, along with dozens of carrier aircraft and most of their aircrew; the Americans lost a handful of planes and suffered damage to Enterprise requiring two months to repair in Hawaii. Unable to safely land on Enterprise's ruined flight deck, many of her remaining aircraft flew to Guadalcanal and reinforced the beleaguered American air units at Henderson Field.

Concurrently to the carrier air battle, on 25 August, Tanaka's convoy, headed by the flagship Jintsū, was attacked near Taivu Point by Cactus Air Force aircraft based at Henderson Field. After suffering heavy damage during the battle, including the sinking of one of the transports, the convoy was forced to divert to the Shortland Islands in the northern Solomons in order to transfer the surviving troops to destroyers for later delivery to Guadalcanal. A Japanese transport was sunk, and the older destroyer Mutsuki was so badly damaged that she had to be scuttled. Several other Japanese warships were damaged, including Tanaka's flagship Jintsū. At this point, Tanaka withdrew and rescheduled the supply run for the night of 28 August, to be carried out by the remaining destroyers. Japanese air raids against the Allied positions on Guadalcanal continued largely unabated during this time.

On 25 August, the American carrier Wasp, after refueling, positioned herself east of Guadalcanal, expecting Japanese movement to the area. No Japanese forces made any movement towards the area, however, and the Wasp was left idle.

The Americans had won a modest tactical victory with the destruction of the Ryūjō, destroying some 75 Japanese aircraft while losing 25 of their own. The forced withdrawal of Tanaka's troop convoy also bought valuable breathing room for the embattled Allied troops on Guadalcanal. While the Enterprise was taken out of action for repair for several months, she was able to return to sea later in the campaign. The temporary loss of Enterprise was offset by the timely arrival of the carrier Hornet. Additionally, the reinforcement of Henderson Field by Enterprise's orphaned carrier aircraft bolstered ground-based Allied air strength on the island, while ground-based Japanese pilots based at Rabaul were forced to undertake a grueling day-long round-trip flight in order to make their attacks. These factors combined to render daylight supply runs to Guadalcanal impossible for the Japanese. Only weeks before this, the Japanese had total control of the sea in the region; now they were forced to make supply runs only under the cover of darkness. Japanese naval commanders began to recognize the reality that their ships could not safely operate in the Solomons in the daytime without first suppressing Allied airpower at Henderson Field.

=== Transport Division 12 ===
For six weeks, from early August to the end of September, the U.S. Navy largely avoided the waters off Tulagi and Guadalcanal, and was ordered not to resupply the Marines or provide escort duty for slow transport ships, as American naval commanders feared a repeat of the disastrous defeat at Savo Island suffered by Australian and American surface vessels on 9 August. Transport Division 12 (Trans Div 12), consisting of six obsolete World War I-era Wickes-class destroyers converted to high-speed transports, were the most heavily armed U.S. surface ships operating in Ironbottom Sound during this time. Their torpedo tubes were retrofitted to hold landing craft boats, enough to carry over 100 extra Marines for rapid transportation. They landed the first Marines onto Tulagi and later on Guadalcanal, conducted special operations missions with Marine Raiders, participated in anti-submarine warfare, and provided covering fire for the Marines on Guadalcanal. They also directly delivered crucial supplies to the Marines that helped to construct Henderson Field and to maintain the aircraft stationed there.

On 30 August USS Colhoun (APD-2) was bombed by Japanese high-altitude horizontal bombers and sank with the loss of 51 men. On 4–5 September, USS Little (APD-4) and USS Gregory (APD-3) had finished landing a complement of Marine Raiders back onto Guadalcanal and proceeded to patrol the area for submarines, which had been surfacing and shelling the Marines nightly. Three Japanese destroyers, which did not know that enemy surface ships were patrolling the area, positioned themselves to attack Henderson Field. They were spotted by two American destroyer-transports, and initially identified as a submarine. A U.S. patrol plane also misidentified the destroyers as an enemy submarine at nighttime and dropped flares over the area, inadvertently silhouetting Little and Gregory. The Japanese destroyers immediately fired on and sank the overmatched American ships. 65 men from Little were killed and 24 men from Gregory were killed, including the commanding officer of Transport Division 12 and the commanding officers of both ships.

=== Air battles over Henderson Field and strengthening of the Lunga defenses ===
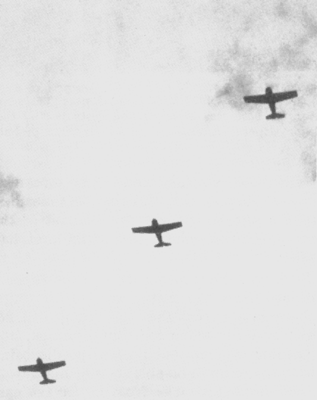
U.S. Marine Grumman F4F Wildcats from Henderson Field preparing to attack incoming Japanese aircraft in late August or early September 1942

Throughout August, small numbers of American aircraft and their crews continued to arrive at Guadalcanal. By the end of August, 64 planes of various types were stationed at Henderson Field. On 3 September, the commander of the 1st Marine Aircraft Wing, U.S. Marine Brigadier General Roy Geiger, arrived with his staff and took command of all air operations at Henderson Field. Air battles between the Allied aircraft at Henderson and Japanese bombers and fighters from Rabaul continued almost daily. Between 26 August and 5 September, the U.S. lost about 15 aircraft to the Japanese's approximately 19. More than half of the U.S. aircrews shot down were rescued; most of the Japanese aircrews were not. The eight-hour round-trip flight from Rabaul to Guadalcanal, about 1,120 miles (1,800 km), seriously hampered Japanese efforts to establish air superiority over Henderson Field. Throughout the campaign, Rabaul-based Japanese aircrew had to fly almost 600 miles before combat with Allied pilots operating in the immediate area of Henderson Field. The Japanese navy also did not systematically rotate their veteran pilots out of combat zones. This steadily exhausted and depleted Japanese air power in the region. From a strategic standpoint, the overall quality of Japanese aviation in the Solomons deteriorated as worn-out veteran pilots were replaced by inexperienced aircrew with minimal combat experience. Australian coastwatchers on Bougainville and New Georgia islands were often able to provide Allied forces on Guadalcanal with advance notice of approaching Japanese air strikes, allowing the U.S. fighters time to take off and position themselves to attack the Japanese aircraft as they approached. The Japanese air forces were slowly losing a war of attrition in the skies above Guadalcanal.

During this time, Vandegrift continued to direct efforts to strengthen and improve the defenses of the Lunga perimeter. Between 21 August and 3 September, he relocated three Marine battalions, including the 1st Raider Battalion, under Merritt A. Edson (Edson's Raiders), and the 1st Parachute Battalion from Tulagi and Gavutu to Guadalcanal. These units added about 1,500 troops to Vandegrift's original 11,000 men defending Henderson Field. The 1st Parachute Battalion, which had suffered heavy casualties in the Battle of Tulagi and Gavutu–Tanambogo in August, was placed under Edson's command.

The other relocated battalion, the 1st Battalion, 5th Marine Regiment, was landed by boat west of the Matanikau near Kokumbuna village on 27 August with the mission of attacking Japanese units in the area, much as in the first Matanikau action of 19 August. The Marines were impeded by difficult terrain, hot sun, and well-emplaced Japanese defenses. The next morning, the Marines found that the Japanese defenders had departed during the night, so the Marines returned to the Lunga perimeter by boat. These actions resulted in the loss of 20 Japanese and 3 Marines.

Small Allied naval convoys arrived at Guadalcanal on 23 and 29 August, and 1 and 8 September to provide the Marines at Lunga with more food, ammunition, aircraft fuel, aircraft technicians, and other supplies. The convoy on 1 September also brought 392 Seabees to maintain and improve Henderson Field. In addition, on 3 September, Marine Aircraft Group 25 began airlifting high-priority cargo, including personnel, aviation gasoline, munitions, and other supplies, to Henderson Field.

=== Tokyo Express ===
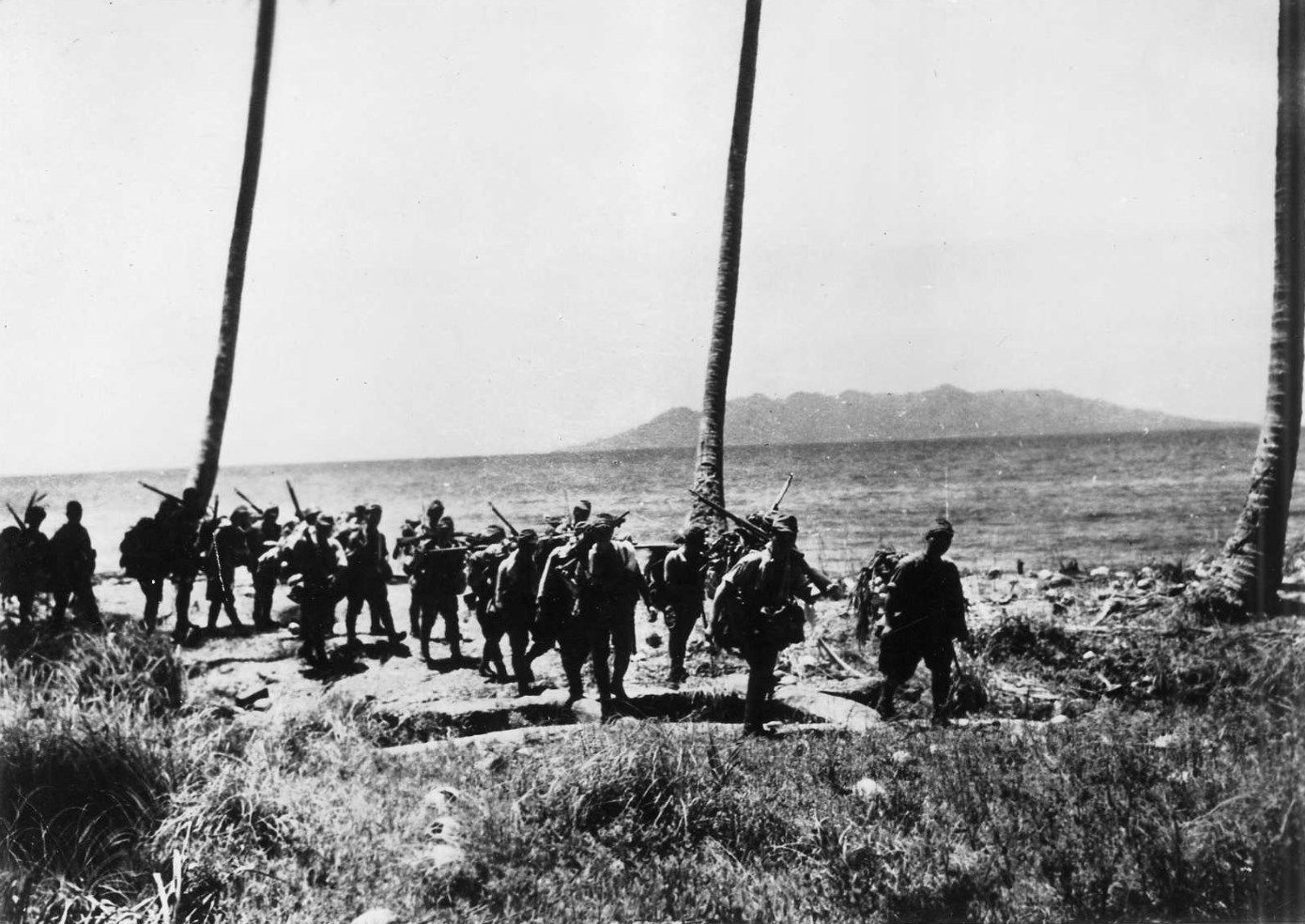
Japanese reinforcements arriving on Guadalcanal, circa early September 1942; note Savo Island in background

By 23 August, Kawaguchi's 35th Infantry Brigade reached Truk and was loaded onto slow transport ships for the rest of the trip to Guadalcanal. The damage done to Tanaka's convoy during the Battle of the Eastern Solomons caused the Japanese to reconsider trying to deliver more troops to Guadalcanal via slow transport. Instead, the ships carrying Kawaguchi's soldiers were rerouted to Rabaul. From there, the Japanese planned to deliver Kawaguchi's unit to Guadalcanal using fast destroyers at night, staging through a Japanese naval base in the Shortland Islands. The Japanese destroyers were usually able to make round trips down "The Slot" (New Georgia Sound) to Guadalcanal and back in a single night throughout the campaign, which minimized their exposure to daytime Allied air attack. These runs became known as the "Tokyo Express" to Allied forces, and were labeled "rat transportation" by the Japanese. While troops could be transported in this manner, most of the heavy equipment such as heavy artillery and vehicles, and supplies such as food and ammunition, could not. In addition, this activity tied up destroyers that the IJN desperately needed to escort convoys elsewhere in the Pacific. The Byzantine nature of the Japanese navy's command setup in the region exacerbated these logistical problems; Tanaka was receiving contradictory orders from the Combined Fleet headquarters and two rival subordinate naval commands at Rabaul, the Eleventh Air Fleet and the Eighth Fleet. Regardless, Tanaka's persistent destroyer operations gradually increased the strength of the forces available to Kawaguchi on the island. A combination of inability and unwillingness prevented Allied naval commanders from frequently challenging Japanese naval forces at night, so the Japanese effectively controlled the seas around the Solomon Islands after sunset. Conversely, the growing Allied airpower at Henderson Field (which was further reinforced on 11–12 September by 24 Wildcats that had been made homeless by the torpedoing of the carrier Saratoga in early September by IJN submarine I-26) meant that any Japanese vessel within range (200 miles or 320 kilometres) of Guadalcanal in daylight was at great risk from air attack. This tactical situation, wherein Japanese naval forces operated freely at night and Allied aircraft enjoyed local air superiority during the day, persisted for the next several months of the campaign.

Between 29 August and 4 September, Japanese light cruisers, destroyers, and patrol boats were able to land almost 5,000 troops at Taivu Point, including most of the 35th Infantry Brigade, much of the Aoba (4th) Regiment, and the rest of Ichiki's regiment. General Kawaguchi, who landed at Taivu Point on 31 August, was placed in command of all Japanese forces on Guadalcanal. A barge convoy took another 1,000 soldiers of Kawaguchi's brigade, under the command of Colonel Akinosuke Oka, to Kamimbo, west of the Lunga perimeter.

=== Battle of Edson's Ridge ===
On 7 September, Kawaguchi issued his attack plan to "rout and annihilate the enemy in the vicinity of the Guadalcanal Island airfield". Kawaguchi's plan called for the forces under his command, split into three divisions, to approach the Lunga perimeter inland, culminating with a surprise night attack. Oka's forces would attack the perimeter from the west, while Ichiki's Second Echelon, renamed the Kuma Battalion, would attack from the east. The main attack would be conducted from the jungle south of the Lunga perimeter by Kawaguchi's "Center Body", numbering 3,000 men in three battalions. By 7 September, most of Kawaguchi's troops had departed Taivu to begin marching towards Lunga Point along the coastline. About 250 Japanese troops remained behind to guard the brigade's supply base at Taivu.

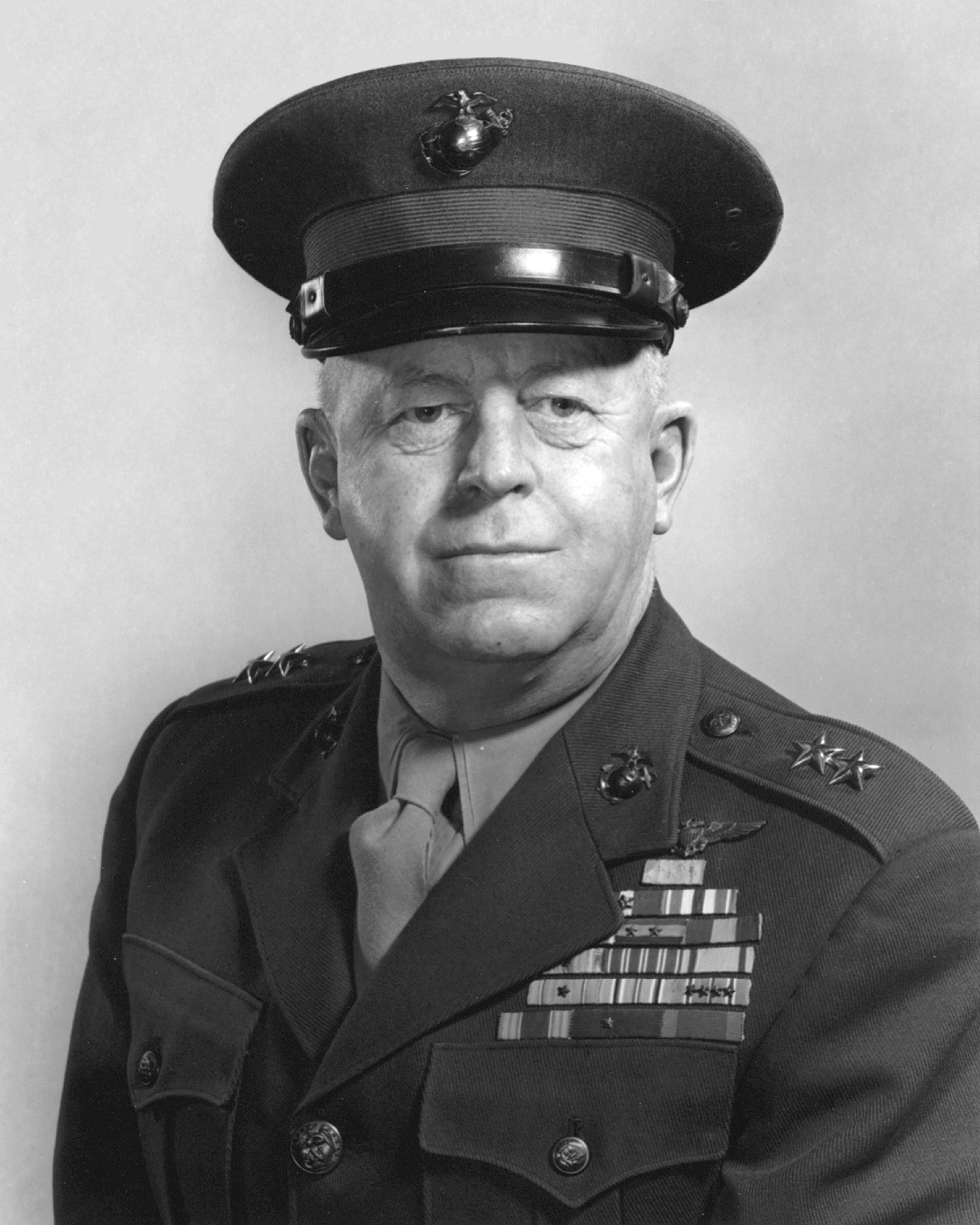
U.S. Marine Lieutenant Colonel Merritt A. Edson (here photographed as a major general) led Marine forces in the Battle of Edson's Ridge.

Meanwhile, native scouts under the direction of Martin Clemens, a coastwatcher officer in the British Solomon Islands Protectorate Defence Force and the British district officer for Guadalcanal, brought reports to the U.S. Marines of Japanese troops at Taivu near the village of Tasimboko. Edson subsequently planned a raid on the Japanese troop concentration at Taivu. On 8 September, after being dropped off near Taivu by boat, Edson's men captured Tasimboko and forced the Japanese defenders to retreat into the jungle. In Tasimboko, Edson's troops discovered Kawaguchi's main supply depot, including large stockpiles of food, ammunition, medical supplies, and a powerful shortwave radio. After destroying everything in sight, aside from some documents and equipment that were carried back with them, the Marines returned to the Lunga perimeter. Intelligence gathered from the captured documents indicated that at least 3,000 Japanese troops were on the island, planning to initiate a large-scale ground assault on the airfield in short order.

Edson, along with Colonel Gerald C. Thomas, Vandegrift's operations officer, correctly anticipated that the main Japanese attack would fall upon Lunga Ridge, a narrow, grassy, 1,000-yard-long (900 m) coral ridge that ran parallel to the Lunga River, just south of Henderson Field. The ridge offered a natural avenue of approach to the airfield, commanded the surrounding area, and was almost undefended. On 11 September, the 840 men of Edson's battalion were deployed onto and around the ridge and began digging in.

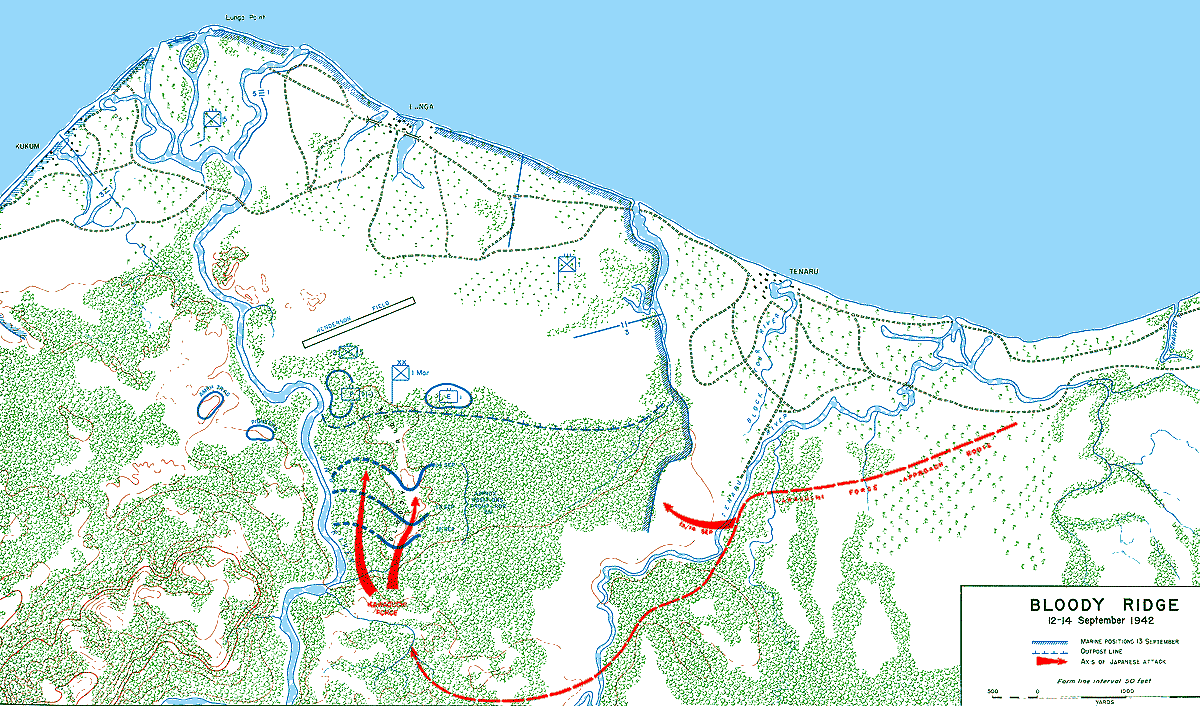
Map of the Lunga perimeter on Guadalcanal showing the approach routes of the Japanese forces and the locations of the Japanese attacks during the battle. Oka's attacks were in the west (left), the Kuma Battalion attacked from the east (right) and the center body attacked "Edson's Ridge" (Lunga Ridge) in the lower center of the map.

On the night of 12 September, Kawaguchi's 1st Battalion attacked the Raiders between the Lunga River and ridge, forcing one Marine company to fall back to the ridge before the Japanese halted their attack for the night. The next night Kawaguchi faced Edson's 840 Raiders with 3,000 troops of his brigade, reinforced by an assortment of light artillery. The Japanese began their attack just after nightfall, with Kawaguchi's 1st Battalion assaulting Edson's right flank just to the west of the ridge. After breaking through the Marine lines, the battalion's assault was eventually stopped by Marine units occupying the northern section of the ridge.

Two companies from Kawaguchi's 2nd Battalion charged up the southern edge of the ridge and pushed Edson's troops back to Hill 123, in the center section of the ridge. Throughout the night the Marines at this position, supported by a battery of howitzers brought up from Lunga Point, turned back wave after wave of frontal Japanese infantry attacks, several of which devolved into hand-to-hand combat. The weight of these repeated assaults eventually pressed the Marines back to within a quarter mile of the airfield. At this stage, as the intensity of the battle reached its apex, small groups of Japanese soldiers managed to break through Edson's lines, with some reaching the edge of the airfield itself. Several Japanese soldiers were killed as they attempted to climb onto and destroy parked aircraft, and General Vandegrift's command post even came under direct attack at dawn, with several Japanese infiltrators killed within sight of the general. Nonetheless, Kawaguchi's units were spent, and the main Japanese attack on Edson's positions ground to a halt. The supporting attacks by the Kuma Battalion and Oka's unit at other locations on the Lunga perimeter were likewise defeated. On 14 September, Kawaguchi led the survivors of his shattered brigade on a five-day march west to the Matanikau Valley to join with Oka's unit. In total Kawaguchi's forces lost about 850 killed, with the Marines suffering 104.

On 15 September at Rabaul, Hyakutake learned of Kawaguchi's defeat and forwarded the news to Imperial General Headquarters in Japan. In an emergency meeting, the senior Japanese IJA and IJN command staffs concluded that "Guadalcanal might develop into the decisive battle of the war". The results of the battle now began to exert significant strategic impact on Japanese operations in other areas of the Pacific. Hyakutake realized that he could not send sufficient men and materiel to defeat the Allied forces on Guadalcanal while simultaneously supporting the major ongoing Japanese offensive on the Kokoda Track in New Guinea. Hyakutake, with the concurrence of General Headquarters, ordered his troops on New Guinea, who were within 30 miles (50 km) of their objective of Port Moresby, to withdraw until the "Guadalcanal matter" was resolved. Hyakutake prepared to send more troops to Guadalcanal for another attempt to recapture Henderson Field.

=== Allied reinforcement ===
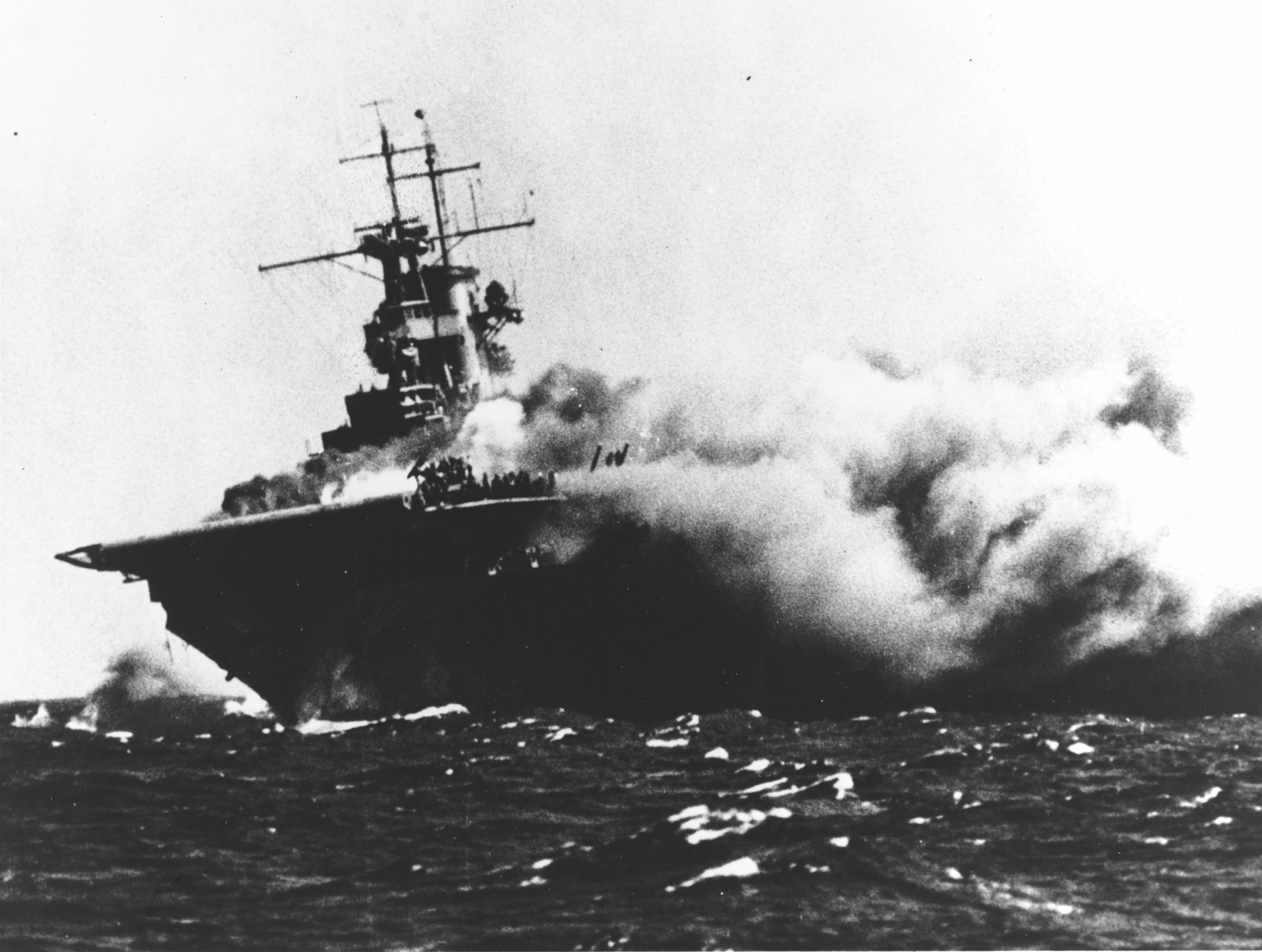
The U.S. carrier Wasp burns after being hit by Japanese submarine torpedoes on 15 September.

As the Japanese regrouped west of the Matanikau, the U.S. forces concentrated on shoring up and strengthening their Lunga defenses. On 14 September Vandegrift moved another battalion (3rd Battalion, 2nd Marine Regiment) from Tulagi to Guadalcanal. On 18 September, an Allied naval convoy delivered 4,157 men from the 3rd Provisional Marine Brigade (the 7th Marine Regiment plus a battalion from the 11th Marine Regiment and some additional support units), 137 vehicles, tents, aviation fuel, ammunition, rations, and engineering equipment to Guadalcanal. These crucial reinforcements allowed Vandegrift, beginning on 19 September, to establish an unbroken line of defense around the Lunga perimeter. While covering this convoy, the aircraft carrier USS Wasp was scuttled after being struck by torpedoes from the Japanese submarine I-19 southeast of Guadalcanal. This stretched Allied naval airpower thin, with only one aircraft carrier (USS Hornet) remaining in operation in the entire South Pacific Area. Vandegrift also made some changes in the senior leadership of his combat units, transferring several officers who did not meet his performance standards off the island and promoting junior officers who had proven themselves to take their place. One of these was the recently promoted Colonel Merritt Edson, who was placed in command of the 5th Marine Regiment.

A lull occurred in the air war over Guadalcanal, with no Japanese air raids between 14 and 27 September because of bad weather, during which both sides reinforced their respective air units. The Japanese delivered 85 fighters and bombers to their air units at Rabaul, while the U.S. sent a further 23 fighters and attack aircraft to Henderson Field. By 20 September the Japanese had 117 total aircraft at Rabaul, while the Allies tallied 71 aircraft at Henderson Field. The air war resumed with a Japanese air raid on Guadalcanal on 27 September, which was contested by U.S. Navy and Marine fighters from Henderson Field.

The Japanese immediately began to prepare for their next attempt to recapture Henderson Field. The 3rd Battalion, 4th (Aoba) Infantry Regiment had landed at Kamimbo Bay on the western end of Guadalcanal on 11 September - too late to join Kawaguchi's attack, but in time to join Oka's forces near the Matanikau. Tokyo Express runs by IJN destroyers on 14, 20, 21 and 24 September brought food and ammunition as well as 280 men from the 1st Battalion, Aoba Regiment, to Kamimbo Bay. Meanwhile, the Japanese 2nd and 38th Infantry Divisions were transported from the Dutch East Indies to Rabaul, beginning on 13 September. The Japanese planned to transport a total of 17,500 troops from these two divisions to Guadalcanal to take part in the next major attack on the Lunga perimeter by late October.

=== Actions along the Matanikau ===
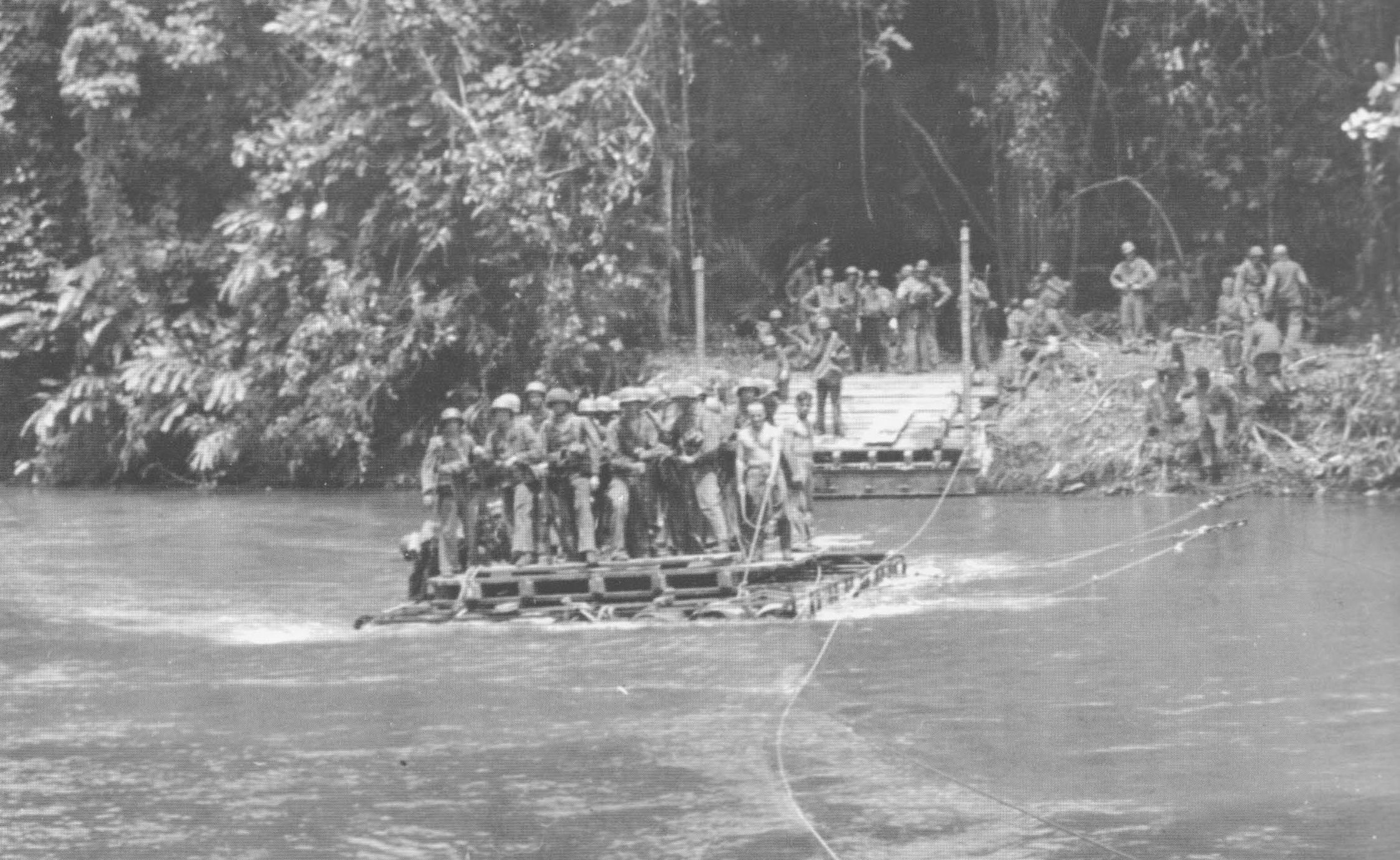
U.S. Marines cross the Matanikau River on Guadalcanal on a raft ferry in November 1942.

Vandegrift and his staff were aware that Kawaguchi's troops had retreated to the area west of the Matanikau, and that numerous groups of Japanese stragglers were scattered throughout the area between the Lunga perimeter and the Matanikau River. Vandegrift therefore decided to conduct another series of small unit operations around the Matanikau Valley. Their purpose was to mop up scattered groups of Japanese troops east of the Matanikau and to keep the main body of Japanese soldiers off-balance, preventing them from consolidating positions so close to the main Marine defenses at Lunga Point.

An attack on Japanese forces west of the Matanikau was conducted between 23 and 27 September by elements of three U.S. Marine battalions. The attack was repulsed by Kawaguchi's troops under Akinosuke Oka's local command. During the action three Marine companies were surrounded by Japanese forces near Point Cruz west of the Matanikau, took heavy losses, and escaped only due to assistance from the destroyer USS Monssen and landing craft crewed by U.S. Coast Guard personnel. One of those was piloted by Douglas Munro, who was killed as he maneuvered his craft to protect the escaping Marines and became the only Coast Guardsman to be awarded the Medal of Honor.

Between 6 and 9 October a larger force of Marines successfully crossed the Matanikau River, attacked newly landed Japanese forces from the 2nd Infantry Division under the command of Generals Masao Maruyama and Yumio Nasu, and inflicted heavy losses on the Japanese 4th Infantry Regiment. This action forced the Japanese to retreat from their positions east of the Matanikau and hindered Japanese preparations for their planned major offensive on the U.S. Lunga defenses. Between 9 and 11 October the U.S. 1st Battalion, 2nd Marines raided two small Japanese outposts about 30 miles (48 km) east of the Lunga perimeter at Gurabusu and Koilotumaria near Aola Bay. These raids killed 35 Japanese at a cost of 17 Marines and 3 U.S. Navy personnel killed.

=== Battle of Cape Esperance ===
Throughout the last week of September and the first week of October, Tokyo Express runs continually delivered troops from the Japanese 2nd Infantry Division to Guadalcanal. The Japanese Navy promised to support the IJA's planned offensive by delivering the necessary troops, equipment, and supplies to the island, and also by stepping up air attacks on Henderson Field and sending warships to bombard the airfield.

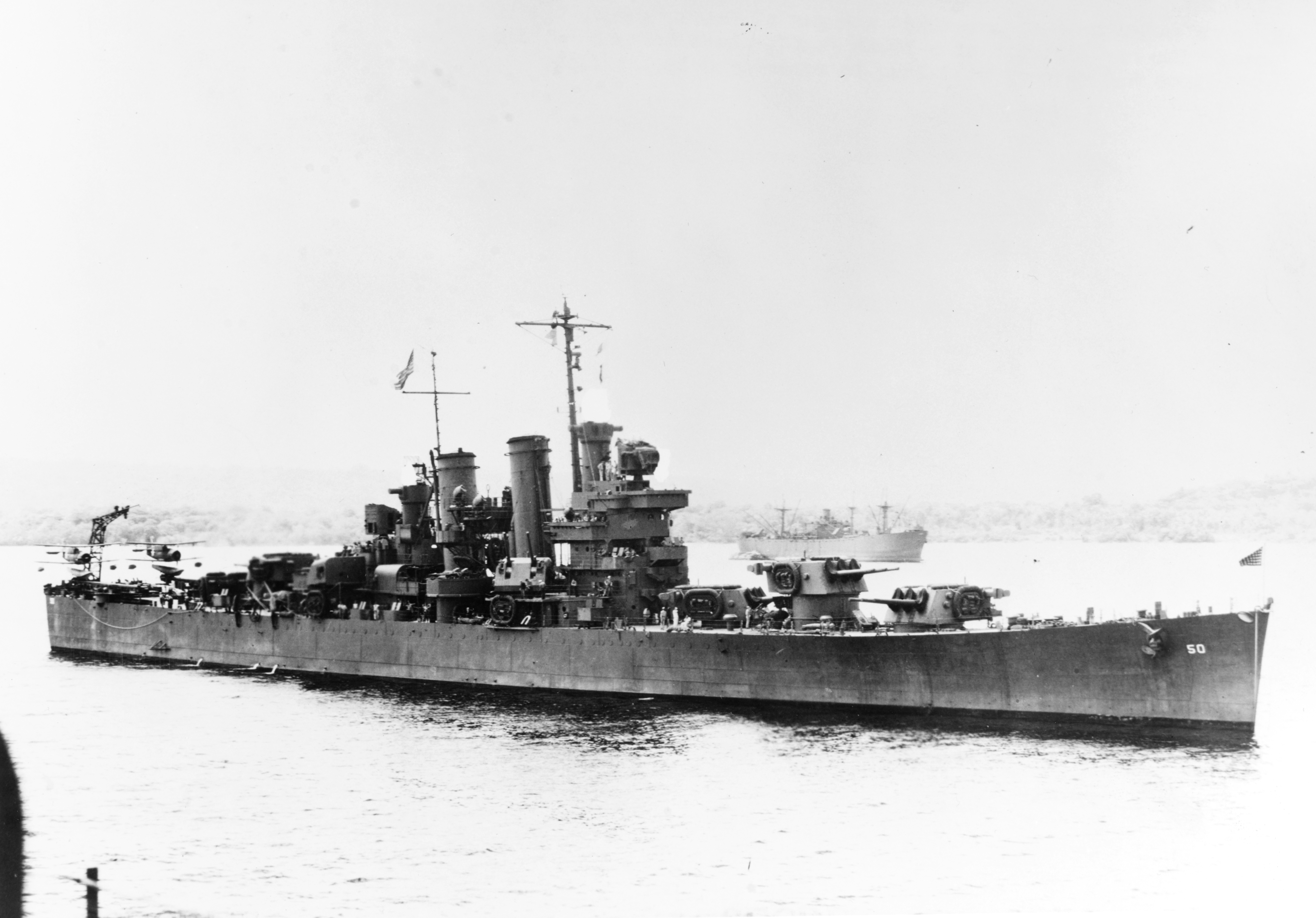
U.S. cruiser Helena, part of Task Force 64 under Norman Scott

In the meantime, Millard F. Harmon, commander of U.S. Army forces in the South Pacific, convinced Ghormley that U.S. Marine forces on Guadalcanal needed to be reinforced immediately if the Allies were to successfully defend the island from the next expected Japanese offensive. Thus, on 8 October, the 2,837 men of the 164th Infantry Regiment from the Americal Division boarded ships at New Caledonia for the trip to Guadalcanal with a projected arrival date of 13 October. To protect the transports carrying the 164th to Guadalcanal, Ghormley ordered Task Force 64, consisting of four cruisers and five destroyers under U.S. Rear Admiral Norman Scott, to intercept and combat any Japanese ships that approached Guadalcanal and threatened the arrival of the transport convoy.

Mikawa's 8th Fleet staff scheduled a substantial Express run for the night of 11 October. Two seaplane tenders and six destroyers were ordered to put 728 soldiers, along with artillery and ammunition, ashore on Guadalcanal. At the same time, in a separate operation, three heavy cruisers and two destroyers under the command of Rear Admiral Aritomo Gotō were to bombard Henderson Field with special explosive shells with the objective of destroying the Cactus Air Force and the airfield's facilities. Because U.S. Navy warships had not yet attempted to interdict any Tokyo Express missions to Guadalcanal, the Japanese were not expecting any opposition from Allied naval surface forces that night.

Just before midnight, Scott's warships detected Gotō's force on radar near the entrance to the strait between Savo Island and Guadalcanal. Scott's force was in a position to cross the T on Gotō's unsuspecting formation. Opening fire, Scott's warships sank a cruiser and a destroyer, heavily damaged another cruiser, mortally wounded Gotō, and forced the rest of Gotō's warships to abandon their bombardment mission and retreat. During the exchange of gunfire, one of Scott's destroyers was sunk, and one cruiser and another destroyer were heavily damaged. In the meantime, the Japanese supply convoy successfully completed unloading at Guadalcanal and began its return journey without being discovered by Scott's force.

Later on the morning of 12 October, four Japanese destroyers from the supply convoy turned back to assist Gotō's retreating, damaged warships. Air attacks by CAF aircraft from Henderson Field sank two of these destroyers later that day. Meanwhile, the convoy of U.S. Army troops reached Guadalcanal as scheduled on 13 October, successfully delivering its cargo and passengers to the island.

=== Henderson Field ===
==== Battleship bombardment ====
Despite the U.S. victory off Cape Esperance, the Japanese continued with plans and preparations for their large offensive scheduled for later in October. The Japanese decided to risk a rare departure from their usual practice of only using fast warships to deliver men and materiel to the island. On 13 October, a convoy comprising six cargo ships escorted by eight screening destroyers departed the Shortland Islands for Guadalcanal. The convoy carried 4,500 troops from the 16th and 230th Infantry Regiments, some naval marines, two batteries of heavy artillery, and one company of tanks.

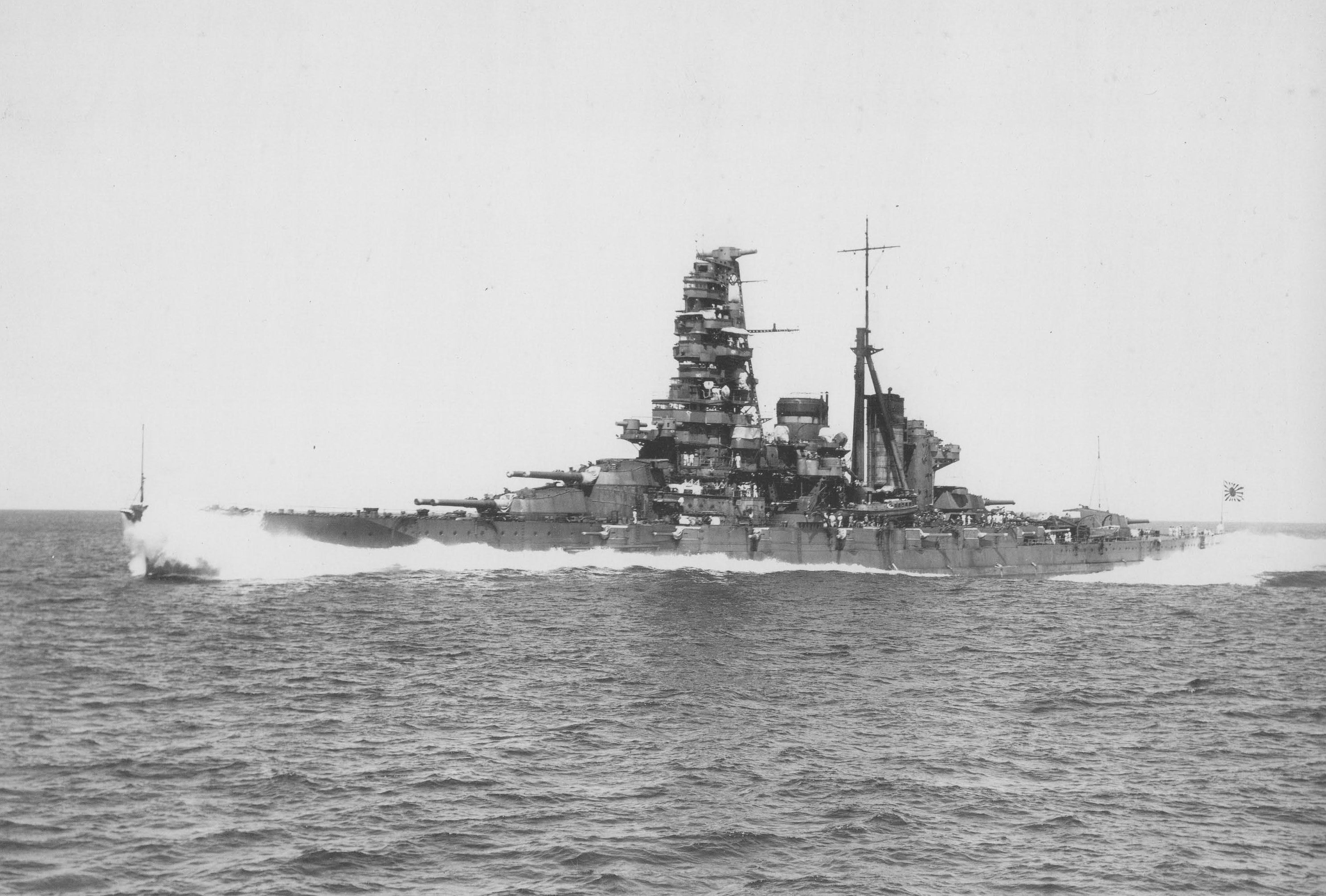
Japanese battleship Haruna

To protect the approaching convoy from attack by CAF aircraft, Yamamoto sent the 3rd Battleship Division from Truk to bombard Henderson Field, under the command of Takeo Kurita. At 01:33 on 14 October, IJN battleships Kongō and Haruna, escorted by one light cruiser and nine destroyers, reached Guadalcanal and opened fire on Henderson Field from a distance of 16,000 meters (17,500 yd). At this range, over ten miles (16 km), Allied shore batteries had no prospect of returning effective fire. Over the next one hour and 23 minutes, the two battleships fired 973 14-inch (356 mm) shells into the Lunga perimeter, most of which fell in and around the 2,200 m^{2} (24,000 sq ft) area of the airfield. Many of the shells were fragmentation shells, effective against land targets. The bombardment heavily damaged both runways, burned almost all of the available aviation fuel, and destroyed 48 of the CAF's 90 aircraft. 41 men were killed, including six CAF pilots. Few CAF aircraft survived entirely unscathed, and only about a dozen remained in flyable condition the next day. Wrecked and damaged planes were lined up wingtip to wingtip, in the hopes of diverting Japanese attention from the few surviving aircraft. After exhausting their ammunition around 3 a.m., the Japanese battleship force immediately returned to Truk. Allied troops stationed at Henderson Field colloquially referred to this bombardment, the heaviest they had endured thus far in the campaign, as "The Night".

Despite the heavy damage, Henderson personnel were able to restore one of the runways to operational condition within a few hours. Seventeen SBD-3 Dauntless dive bombers and 20 F4F Wildcats at Espiritu Santo were quickly flown to Henderson, and U.S. Army and Marine transport aircraft shuttled aviation gasoline from Espiritu Santo to Guadalcanal. Aware of the approach of the large Japanese reinforcement convoy, the U.S. desperately sought a way to interdict the convoy before it could reach Guadalcanal. Using fuel drained from destroyed aircraft and from a cache in the nearby jungle, the CAF attacked the convoy twice on 14 October but caused no damage.

The Japanese convoy reached Tassafaronga Point at midnight on 14 October and began unloading. Throughout the day of 15 October, a string of CAF aircraft from Henderson bombed and strafed the unloading convoy, destroying three of the cargo ships. The remainder of the convoy departed that night, having unloaded all of the troops and about two-thirds of the supplies and equipment. Several Japanese heavy cruisers also bombarded Henderson on the nights of 14 and 15 October, destroying a few additional CAF aircraft but failing to inflict further significant damage to the airfield.

==== Battle for Henderson Field ====
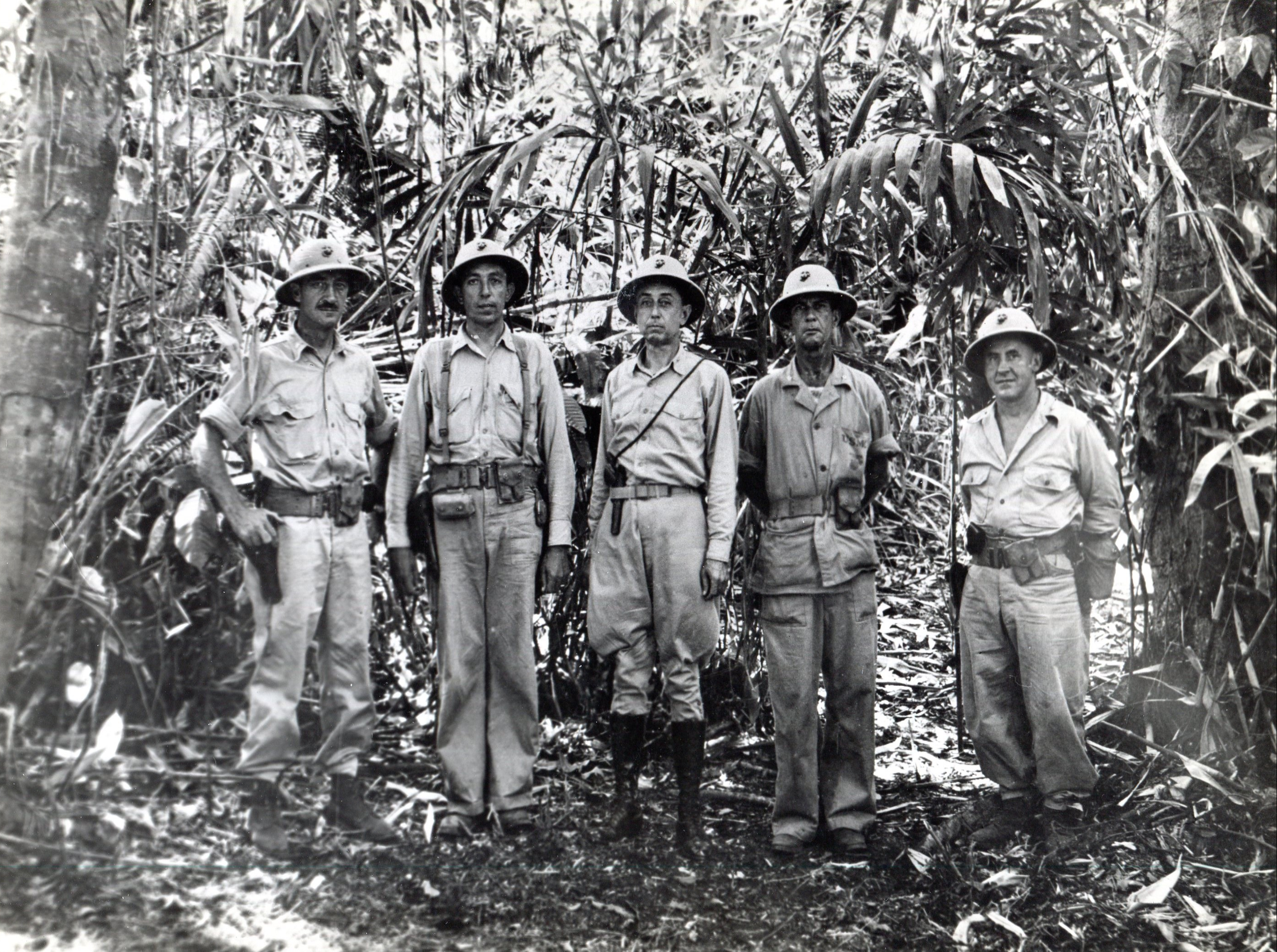
From left to right: Lieutenant Colonel Leonard B. Cresswell (1st Battalion), Lieutenant Colonel Edwin A. Pollock (Executive Officer 1st Marines), Colonel Clifton B. Cates (Commanding Officer 1st Marines), Lieutenant Colonel William N. McKelvy (3rd Battalion) and Lieutenant Colonel William W. Stickney (2nd Battalion) on Guadalcanal, October 1942

Between 1 and 17 October, the Japanese delivered 15,000 troops to Guadalcanal, giving Hyakutake 20,000 total troops to employ for his planned offensive. Because of the loss of their positions on the east side of the Matanikau, the Japanese decided that an attack on the U.S. defenses along the coast would be prohibitively difficult. Therefore, Hyakutake decided that the main thrust of his planned attack would be from south of Henderson Field. His 2nd Division (augmented by troops from the 38th Division), under Maruyama and comprising 7,000 soldiers in three infantry regiments of three battalions each was ordered to march through the jungle and attack the American defenses from the south, near the east bank of the Lunga River. The date of the attack was set for 22 October, then changed to 23 October. To distract the Americans from the planned attack from the south, Hyakutake's heavy artillery plus five battalions of infantry (about 2,900 men) under Major General Tadashi Sumiyoshi were to attack the American defenses from the west along the coastal corridor. The Japanese estimated that there were 10,000 American troops on the island, when in fact there were about 23,000. Despite this, American commanders were pessimistic about their ability to repulse another concerted Japanese attack on the airfield. Units were given orders to fight as guerrillas should they be overrun by the Japanese, and the 1st Marine Division's intelligence staff began burning their classified records. Speaking to reporters in Washington, D.C., Secretary of the Navy Frank Knox refused to publicly guarantee that Guadalcanal could be held.

Map of the battle, 23–26 October. Sumiyoshi's forces attack in the west at the Matanikau (left) while Maruyama's 2nd division attacks the Lunga perimeter from the south (right).

On 12 October, a company of Japanese engineers began to break a trail, called the "Maruyama Road", from the Matanikau towards the southern portion of the U.S. Lunga perimeter. The 15-mile-long (24 km) trail traversed some of the most difficult terrain on Guadalcanal, including numerous rivers and streams, deep, muddy ravines, steep ridges, and dense jungle. Between 16 and 18 October, the 2nd Division began their march along the Maruyama Road.

By 23 October, Maruyama's forces were still struggling through the jungle to reach the American lines. That evening, after learning that his forces had yet to reach their attack positions, Hyakutake postponed the attack to 19:00 on 24 October. The Americans remained unaware of the approach of Maruyama's forces.

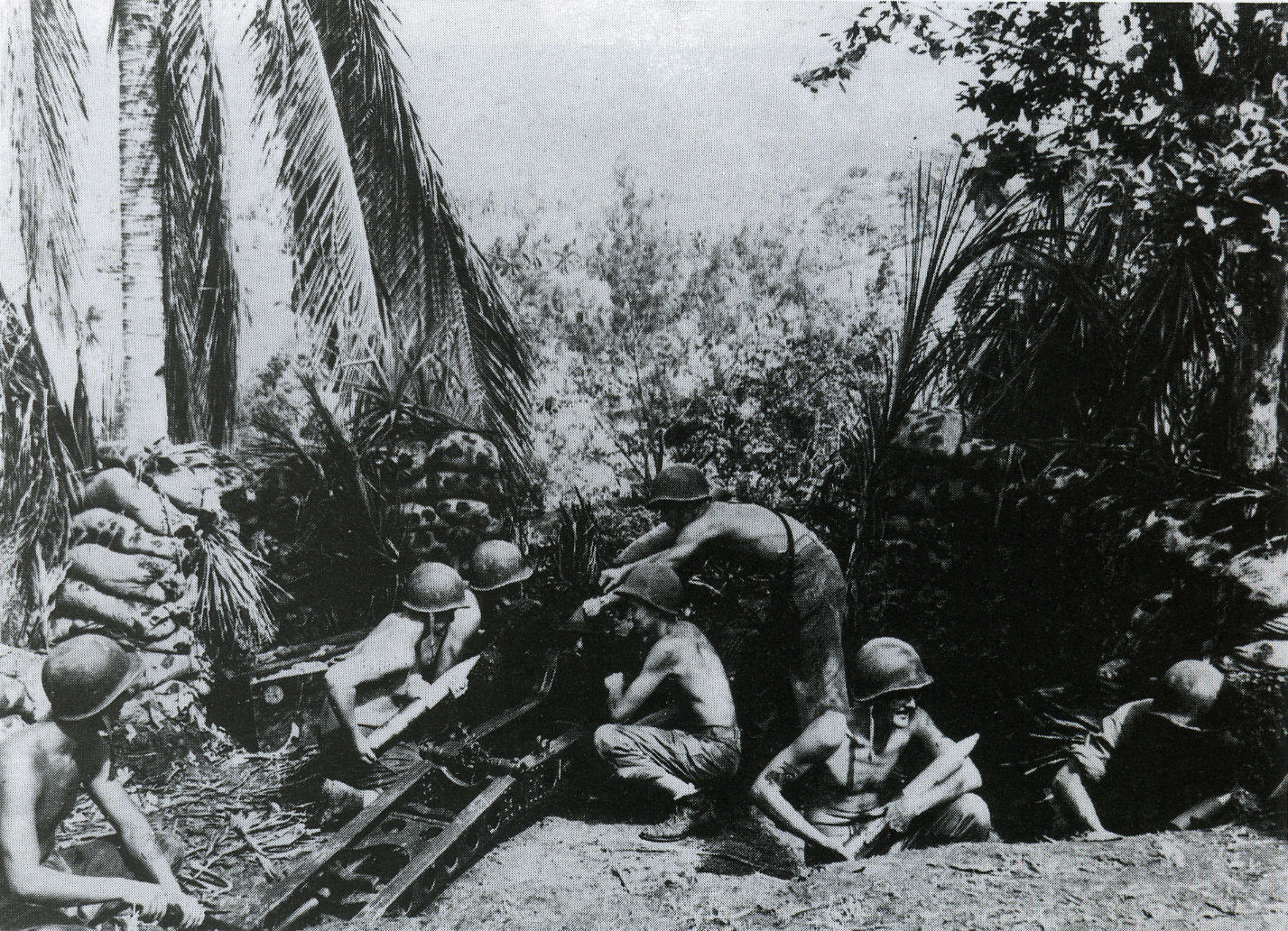
A U.S. 11th Marines 75mm pack howitzer and crew

Sumiyoshi was informed by Hyakutake's staff of the postponement of the offensive to 24 October, but he was unable to contact his troops to inform them of the delay. Thus, at dusk on 23 October, two battalions of the 4th Infantry Regiment and the nine tanks of the 1st Independent Tank Company launched attacks on the U.S. Marine defenses at the mouth of the Matanikau. U.S. Marine artillery, cannon, and small arms fire repulsed the attacks, destroying all the tanks and killing many of the Japanese soldiers while suffering only light casualties.

Finally, late on 24 October, Maruyama's forces reached the Lunga perimeter. Over two consecutive nights Maruyama's forces conducted numerous frontal assaults on positions defended by troops of the U.S. Army's 3rd Battalion, 164th Infantry Regiment, commanded by Lieutenant Colonel Robert Hall and the 1st Battalion, 7th Marines under Lieutenant Colonel Chesty Puller. U.S. Army and Marine Corps units armed with rifles, machine guns, mortars, and artillery, including direct canister fire from 37 mm anti-tank guns, "wrought terrible carnage" on the Japanese. A few small groups of Japanese broke through the American defenses, but were hunted down and killed over the next several days. More than 1,500 of Maruyama's troops were killed in the attacks, while the Americans lost about 60 killed. Over the same two days American aircraft from Henderson Field defended against attacks by Japanese aircraft and warships, destroying 14 aircraft and sinking light cruiser Yura.

Further Japanese attacks near the Matanikau on 26 October were also repulsed with heavy losses for the Japanese. As a result, by 08:00 on 26 October, Hyakutake called off any further attacks and ordered his forces to retreat. About half of Maruyama's survivors were ordered to retreat back to the upper Matanikau Valley while the 230th Infantry Regiment under Colonel Toshinari Shōji was told to head for Koli Point, east of the Lunga perimeter. Leading elements of the 2nd Division reached the 17th Army headquarters area at Kokumbona, west of the Matanikau on 4 November. The same day, Shōji's unit reached Koli Point and made camp. Decimated by combat losses, malnutrition, and tropical diseases, the 2nd Division was incapable of further offensive action and fought as a defensive force along the coast for the rest of the campaign. In total, the Japanese lost 2,200–3,000 troops in the battle while the Americans lost around 80 killed.

=== Battle of the Santa Cruz Islands ===
At the same time that Hyakutake's troops were attacking the Lunga perimeter, a large Japanese naval force consisting of two fleet carriers (Shokaku and Zuikaku), two other light carriers, four battleships and various supporting vessels moved into a position near the southern Solomon Islands. Under the overall command of Yamamoto, this fleet was the largest that the Japanese had assembled since the Battle of Midway. Yamamoto's goal was to draw the bulk of Allied naval strength in the region, specifically the American aircraft carriers, into a decisive sea battle at the same time that Japanese troops on Guadalcanal were attacking the airfield in force. Allied naval carrier forces in the area, under the overall command of William Halsey Jr., also hoped to meet the Japanese naval forces in battle. Nimitz had replaced Ghormley with Admiral Halsey on 18 October after concluding that Ghormley had become too pessimistic and myopic to effectively continue leading Allied forces in the South Pacific Area. Due to faulty reports from Hyakutake that his ground forces had seized the airfield over the night of 25 October, Yamamoto ordered his task force to sail south and seek out the American fleet.

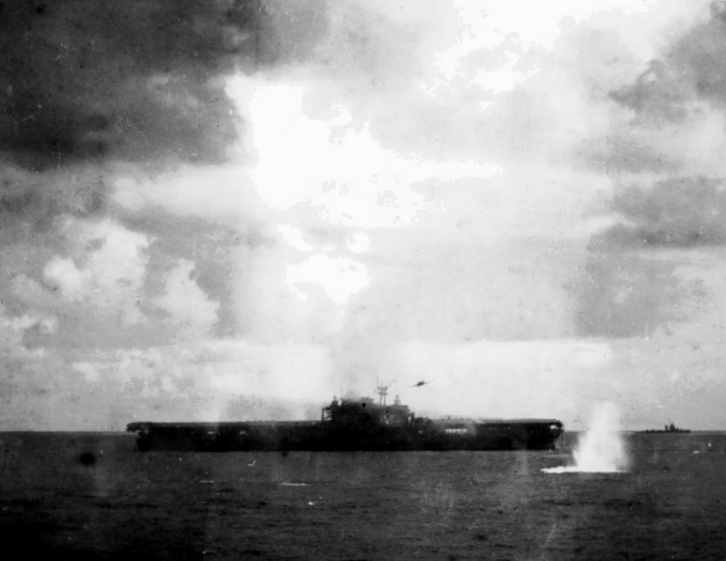
USS Hornet is torpedoed and fatally damaged by a Japanese carrier aircraft on 26 October.

The two opposing carrier forces confronted each other on the morning of 26 October, in what became known as the Battle of the Santa Cruz Islands, the last carrier battle of the war in the Pacific until the Battle of the Philippine Sea nearly two years later. After an exchange of carrier air attacks, Allied surface ships were forced to retreat from the battle area with the loss of one carrier sunk (Hornet) and another (Enterprise) heavily damaged. The participating Japanese carrier forces, however, also retired because of high aircraft and aircrew losses and significant damage to two carriers. Although the Japanese had apparently secured a tactical victory in terms of ships sunk and damaged, their loss of almost 150 veteran carrier pilots provided a long-term strategic advantage for the Allies, whose aircrew losses in the battle were relatively low. Throughout the Guadalcanal campaign, Allied forces were far more successful in recovering downed pilots (both ground-based and carrier-based) than the Japanese. Japanese carriers would play no further significant role in the campaign.

=== November land actions ===
In order to exploit the victory in the Battle for Henderson Field, Vandegrift sent one Army battalion and six Marine battalions, on an offensive west of the Matanikau. The operation was commanded by Merritt Edson and its goal was to capture Kokumbona, headquarters of the 17th Army, west of Point Cruz. Defending the Point Cruz area were Japanese Army troops from the 4th Infantry Regiment commanded by Nomasu Nakaguma. The 4th Infantry was severely understrength because of battle damage, tropical disease, and malnutrition.

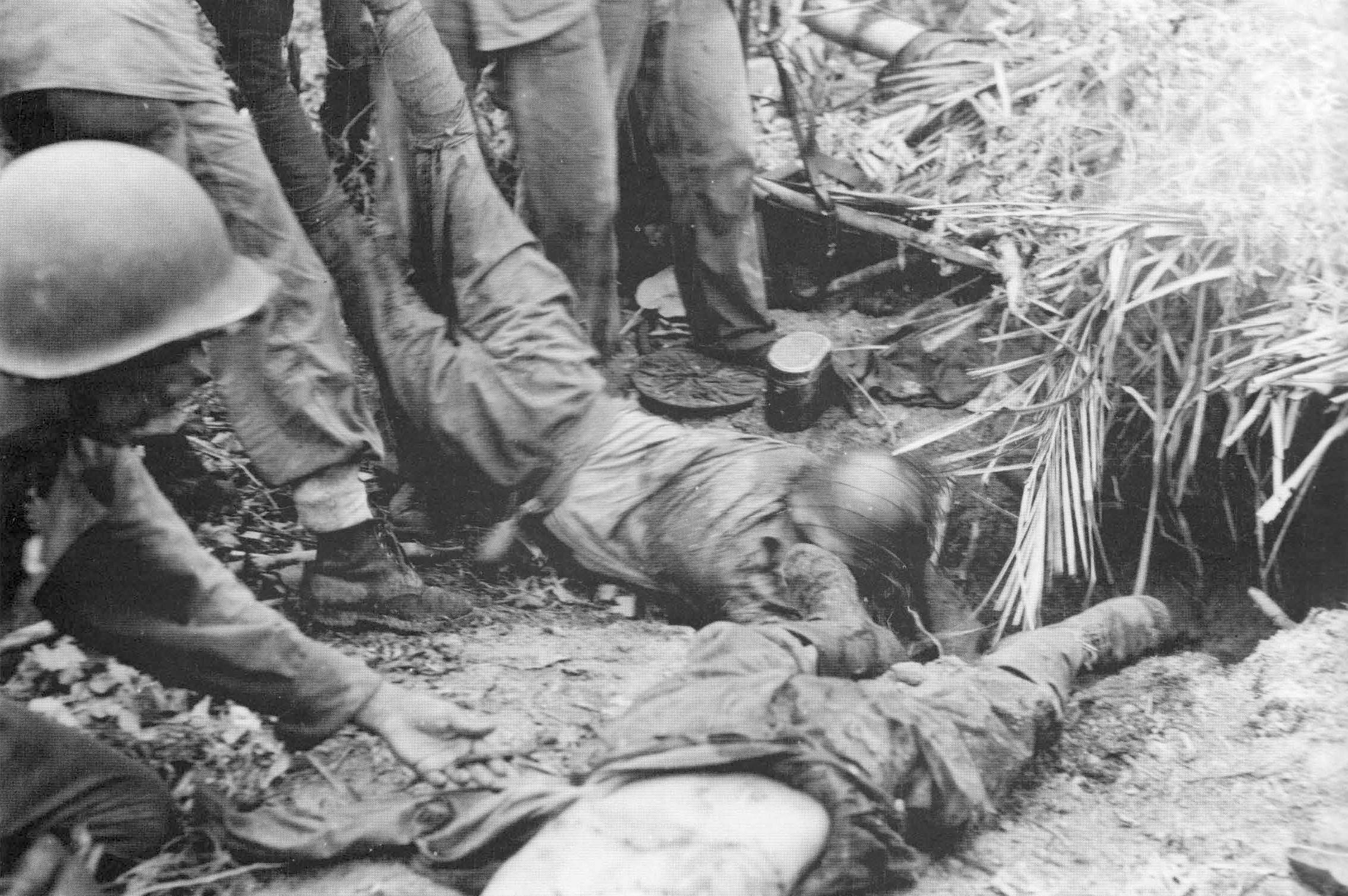
U.S. Marines drag the corpses of Japanese soldiers from their bunker in the Point Cruz area after the battle in early November.

The American offensive began on 1 November and succeeded in destroying Japanese forces defending the Point Cruz area by 3 November, including troops sent to reinforce Nakaguma's battered regiment. The Americans appeared to be on the verge of breaking through the Japanese defenses and capturing Kokumbona. At this time, however, other American forces discovered and engaged newly landed Japanese troops near Koli Point on the eastern side of the Lunga perimeter. To counter this new threat, Vandegrift temporarily halted the Matanikau offensive on 4 November. The Americans suffered 71 killed and the Japanese around 400 killed in the offensive.

At Koli Point early in the morning 3 November, five Japanese destroyers delivered 300 army troops to support Shōji and his troops who were en route to Koli Point after the Battle for Henderson Field. Having learned of the planned landing, Vandegrift sent a battalion of Marines under Herman H. Hanneken to intercept the Japanese at Koli. Soon after landing, the Japanese soldiers encountered and drove Hanneken's battalion back towards the Lunga perimeter. In response, Vandegrift ordered Puller's Marine battalion plus two of the 164th infantry battalions, along with Hanneken's battalion, to move towards Koli Point to attack the Japanese forces there.

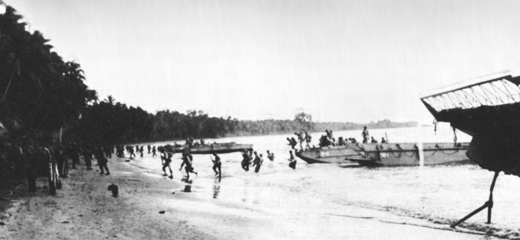
Carlson's raiders coming ashore at Aola Bay on 4 November

As the American troops began to move, Shōji and his soldiers began to arrive at Koli Point. Beginning on 8 November, the American troops attempted to encircle Shōji's forces at Gavaga Creek near Koli Point. Meanwhile, Hyakutake ordered Shōji to abandon his positions at Koli and rejoin Japanese forces at Kokumbona in the Matanikau area. A gap existed by way of a swampy creek in the southern side of the American lines. Between 9 and 11 November, Shōji and between 2,000 and 3,000 of his men escaped into the jungle to the south. On 12 November, the Americans completely overran and killed all the remaining Japanese soldiers left in the pocket. The Americans counted the bodies of 450–475 Japanese dead in the Koli Point area and captured most of Shōji's heavy weapons and provisions. The American forces suffered 40 killed and 120 wounded in the operation.

Meanwhile, on 4 November, two companies from the 2nd Marine Raider Battalion, commanded by Lieutenant Colonel Evans Carlson landed by boat at Aola Bay, 40 miles (64 km) east of Lunga Point. Troops from the Army's 147th Infantry Regiment, along with Carlson's raiders, were to provide security for 500 Seabees as they attempted to construct an airfield at that location. Halsey, acting on a recommendation by Turner, had approved the Aola Bay airfield construction effort; however it was abandoned at the end of November because of unsuitable terrain.

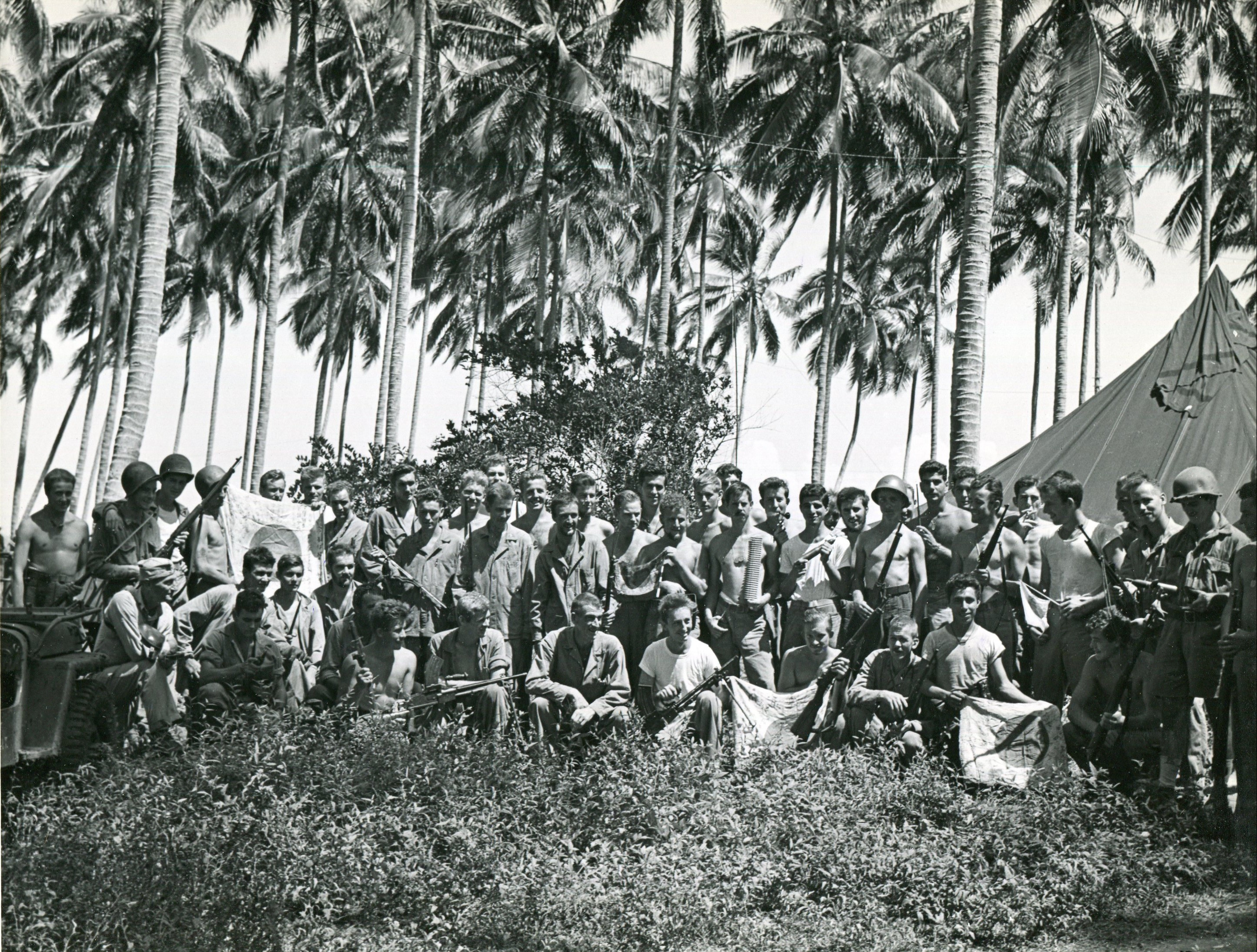
Carlson's Raiders with captured Japanese equipment on Guadalcanal

On 5 November, Vandegrift ordered Carlson and his raiders to march overland from Aola and attack any of Shōji's forces that had escaped from Koli Point. With the rest of the companies from his battalion, which arrived a few days later, Carlson and his troops set off on a 29-day patrol from Aola to the Lunga perimeter. During the patrol, the raiders fought several battles with Shōji's retreating forces, killing almost 500 of them, while suffering 16 killed. Tropical diseases and a lack of food felled more of Shōji's men. By the time Shōji's forces reached the Lunga River in mid-November, about halfway to the Matanikau, only 1,300 men remained with the main body. When Shōji reached the 17th Army positions west of the Matanikau, only 700 to 800 survivors were still with him. Most of the survivors from Shōji's force joined other Japanese units defending the Mount Austen and upper Matanikau River area.

Tokyo Express runs on 5, 7, and 9 November delivered additional troops from the Japanese 38th Infantry Division, including most of the 228th Infantry Regiment. These fresh troops were quickly placed in the Point Cruz and Matanikau area and helped successfully resist further attacks by American forces on 10 and 18 November. The Americans and Japanese remained facing each other along a line just west of Point Cruz for the next six weeks.

=== Naval Battle of Guadalcanal ===
After the defeat in the Battle for Henderson Field, the IJA planned to try again to retake the airfield in November 1942, but further reinforcements were needed before the operation could proceed. The IJA requested assistance from Yamamoto to deliver the needed reinforcements to the island and to support the next offensive. Yamamoto provided 11 large transport ships to carry the remaining 7,000 troops from the 38th Infantry Division, their ammunition, food, and heavy equipment from Rabaul to Guadalcanal. He also provided a warship support force that included two battleships, Hiei and Kirishima, equipped with special fragmentation shells, which were to bombard Henderson Field on the night of 12–13 November. The goal of the bombardment was to destroy the airfield and the aircraft stationed there, to allow the slow transports to reach Guadalcanal and unload safely the next day. The warship force was commanded from Hiei by recently promoted Vice Admiral Hiroaki Abe.

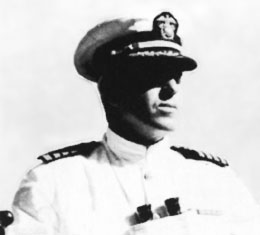
U.S. Rear Admiral Daniel J. Callaghan (pictured here as a captain)

In early November, Allied intelligence learned that the Japanese were preparing again to try to retake Henderson Field. In response, on 11 November the U.S. sent Turner's Task Force 67 to Guadalcanal, carrying Marine replacements, two U.S. Army infantry battalions, ammunition and food. The supply ships were protected by two task groups, commanded by Rear Admirals Daniel J. Callaghan and Norman Scott, as well as by aircraft from Henderson Field. The ships were attacked several times on 11 and 12 November by Japanese aircraft from Rabaul staging through an air base at Buin, Bougainville, but most unloaded their cargo without serious damage.

U.S. reconnaissance aircraft spotted the approach of Abe's bombardment force and passed a warning to Allied commanders. Thus warned, Turner detached all usable combat ships under Callaghan to protect the troops ashore from the expected Japanese naval attack and troop landing, and ordered the supply ships at Guadalcanal to depart by early evening 12 November. Callaghan's force comprised two heavy cruisers, three light cruisers, and eight destroyers.

Around 01:30 on 13 November, Callaghan's force intercepted Abe's bombardment group between Guadalcanal and Savo Island. In addition to the two battleships, Abe's force included one light cruiser and 11 destroyers. In the pitch darkness the two warship forces became intermingled before opening fire at unusually close range. In the resulting mêlée, Abe's warships sank or severely damaged all but one cruiser and one destroyer in Callaghan's force; both Callaghan and Scott were killed. Two Japanese destroyers were sunk, and another destroyer and the battleship Hiei were heavily damaged. Despite his defeat of Callaghan's force, Abe ordered his warships to retire without bombarding Henderson Field. The Hiei sank later that day after repeated air attacks by aircraft from Henderson Field and the carrier Enterprise. Because of Abe's failure to neutralize Henderson Field, Yamamoto ordered Tanaka's troop transport convoy, located near the Shortland Islands, to wait an additional day before heading towards Guadalcanal. Yamamoto ordered Nobutake Kondō to assemble another bombardment force using warships from Truk and Abe's force to attack Henderson Field on 15 November.

In the meantime, around 02:00 on 14 November, a cruiser and destroyer force under Gunichi Mikawa from Rabaul conducted an unopposed bombardment of Henderson Field. The bombardment caused some damage, but failed to put the airfield or most of its aircraft out of operation. As Mikawa's force retired towards Rabaul, Tanaka's transport convoy, trusting that Henderson Field was destroyed or heavily damaged, began its run down "the Slot" towards Guadalcanal. Throughout the day of 14 November, aircraft from Henderson Field and the Enterprise attacked Mikawa and Tanaka's ships, sinking one heavy cruiser and seven of the transports. Most of the troops were rescued from the transports by Tanaka's escorting destroyers and returned to the Shortlands. After dark, Tanaka and the remaining four transports continued towards Guadalcanal as Kondō's force approached to bombard Henderson Field.

In order to intercept Kondō's force, Halsey, who was low on undamaged ships, detached two battleships, the Washington and South Dakota, and four destroyers from the Enterprise task force. This force, under the command of Willis A. Lee aboard the Washington, reached Guadalcanal and Savo Island just before midnight on 14 November, shortly before Kondō's bombardment force arrived. Kondō's force consisted of the battleship Kirishima, two heavy cruisers, two light cruisers, and nine destroyers. After the two forces made contact, Kondō's force quickly sank three of the U.S. destroyers and heavily damaged the fourth. The Japanese warships then sighted, opened fire, and damaged the South Dakota. As Kondō's warships concentrated on the South Dakota, the Washington approached the Japanese ships unobserved and opened fire on the Kirishima, inflicting severe damage upon the Japanese battleship. After fruitlessly chasing the Washington towards the Russell Islands, Kondō ordered his warships to retire without bombarding Henderson Field. One of Kondō's destroyers was also sunk during the engagement.

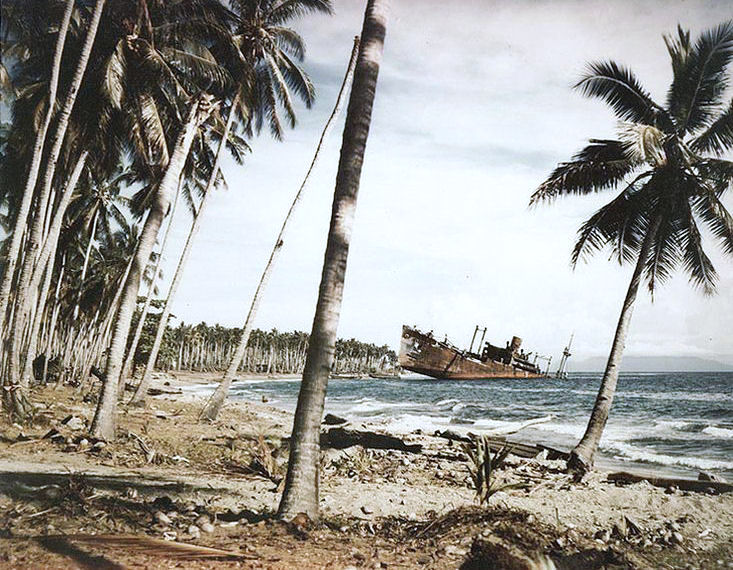
Transport Kinugawa Maru beached at Guadalcanal in November 1942.

As Kondō's ships retired, the four Japanese transports beached near Tassafaronga Point on Guadalcanal at 04:00. At 05:55, U.S. aircraft and artillery began attacking the beached transports, destroying all four, along with most of the supplies that they carried. Only 2,000–3,000 of the IJA troops reached the shore. Because of the failure to deliver most of the troops and supplies, the Japanese were forced to cancel their planned November offensive on Henderson Field, making the battle a significant strategic victory for the Allies and marking the beginning of the end of Japanese attempts to retake Henderson Field.

On 26 November, Japanese Lieutenant General Hitoshi Imamura took command of the newly formed Eighth Area Army at Rabaul. The new command encompassed both Hyakutake's 17th Army and the 18th Army in New Guinea. One of Imamura's first priorities upon assuming command was the continuation of the attempts to retake Henderson Field and Guadalcanal. The Allied offensive at Buna in New Guinea, however, changed Imamura's priorities. Because the Allied attempt to take Buna was considered a more severe threat to Rabaul, Imamura postponed further major reinforcement efforts to Guadalcanal, in order to concentrate on the situation in New Guinea.

=== Battle of Tassafaronga ===
By this stage of the campaign, the Japanese were experiencing severe difficulty delivering sufficient supplies to sustain their troops on Guadalcanal. Attempts to use submarines for resupply runs in the last two weeks in November failed to provide sufficient food for Hyakutake's forces. A separate attempt to establish bases in the central Solomon Islands, which could facilitate barge convoys to Guadalcanal, also failed because of destructive and frequent Allied air attacks. On 26 November, the 17th Army notified Imamura that it faced an acute food crisis. Some front-line units had not been resupplied for six days, and even the rear-area troops were on one-third rations. The situation forced the Japanese to return to delivering supplies with destroyers, which were unable to bring the amounts required by the beleaguered IJA troops on Guadalcanal.

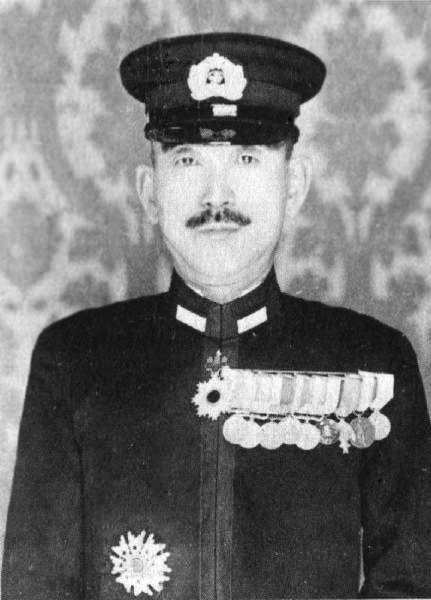
Raizo Tanaka

The staff of the IJN Eighth Fleet devised a plan to help reduce the exposure of destroyers delivering supplies to Guadalcanal. Large oil or gas drums were cleaned and filled with medical supplies and food, with enough air space to provide buoyancy, and strung together with rope. When the destroyers arrived at Guadalcanal they would make a sharp turn and the drums would be cut loose. A swimmer or boat from shore was to pick up the buoyed end of a rope attached to the drums and return it to the beach, where teams of soldiers could haul in the supplies.

The Eighth Fleet's Guadalcanal Reinforcement Unit (the Tokyo Express), commanded by Tanaka, was tasked by Mikawa with making the first of five scheduled runs to Tassafaronga using the drum method on the night of 30 November. Tanaka's unit was centered on eight destroyers, with six destroyers assigned to carry between 200 and 240 drums of supplies apiece. Notified by intelligence sources of the Japanese supply attempt, Halsey ordered the newly formed Task Force 67, comprising four cruisers and four destroyers under the command of Rear Admiral Carleton H. Wright, to intercept Tanaka's force off Guadalcanal. Two additional destroyers joined Wright's force en route to Guadalcanal from Espiritu Santo during the day of 30 November.

At 22:40 on 30 November, Tanaka's force arrived off Guadalcanal and prepared to unload the supply barrels. Meanwhile, Wright's warships were approaching through Ironbottom Sound from the opposite direction. Wright's destroyers detected Tanaka's force on radar, and the destroyer commander requested permission to attack with torpedoes. Wright waited four minutes before giving permission, allowing Tanaka's force to escape from an optimum firing setup. All of the American torpedoes missed their targets. At the same time, Wright's cruisers opened fire, hitting and destroying one of the Japanese guard destroyers. The rest of Tanaka's warships abandoned the supply mission, increased speed, turned, and launched a total of 44 torpedoes in the direction of Wright's cruisers. The Japanese torpedoes hit and sank the U.S. cruiser Northampton and heavily damaged the cruisers Minneapolis, New Orleans, and Pensacola. The rest of Tanaka's destroyers escaped without damage but failed to deliver any of the provisions to Guadalcanal.

By 7 December 1942, Hyakutake's forces were losing about 50 men each day from malnutrition, disease, and Allied ground or air attacks. Further attempts by Tanaka's destroyer forces to deliver provisions on 3, 7 and 11 December failed to alleviate the crisis, and one of Tanaka's destroyers was sunk by a U.S. PT boat torpedo. Tanaka privately informed Admiral Mikawa that the Japanese forces on Guadalcanal could no longer be supplied by sea, and advised that they be withdrawn from the island. Tanaka was subsequently transferred to an administrative post in Singapore.

=== Japanese decision to withdraw ===
On 12 December, the Japanese Navy proposed that Guadalcanal be abandoned. At the same time, several army staff officers at the Imperial General Headquarters (IGH) also suggested that further efforts to retake Guadalcanal would be impossible. A delegation led by Colonel Joichiro Sanada, chief of the IGH's operations section, visited Rabaul on 19 December and consulted Imamura and his staff. Upon the delegation's return to Tokyo, Sanada recommended that Guadalcanal be abandoned. The IGH's top leaders agreed with Sanada's recommendation on 26 December and ordered their staffs to begin drafting plans for a withdrawal from Guadalcanal, establishment of a new defense line in the central Solomons, and shifting priorities and resources to the campaign in New Guinea.

On 28 December, General Hajime Sugiyama and Admiral Osami Nagano personally informed Emperor Hirohito of the decision to withdraw from Guadalcanal. On 31 December, Hirohito formally endorsed the decision. The Japanese secretly began to prepare for the evacuation, called Operation Ke, scheduled to begin during the latter part of January 1943. By now, Japanese forces on the island had dwindled to fewer than 15,000 men.

=== Battle of Mount Austen, the Galloping Horse, and the Sea Horse ===
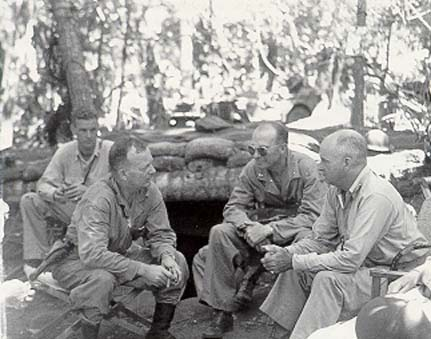
Left to right, unnamed soldier, Colonel Richard H. Jeschke, Commander of the 8th Marines, U.S. Army Major General Alexander Patch, who succeeded Vandegrift on 9 December 1942

By December, the weary 1st Marine Division was withdrawn for recuperation, and over the course of the next month the U.S. XIV Corps took over operations on the island. This corps consisted of the U.S. Army's 25th Infantry and 23rd "Americal" Divisions and the 2nd Marine Division. U.S. Army Major General Alexander Patch replaced Vandegrift as commander of Allied forces on Guadalcanal, which by January totaled just over 50,000 men.

On 18 December, Allied (mainly U.S. Army) forces began attacking Japanese positions on Mount Austen. A strong Japanese fortified position, called the Gifu, stymied the attacks and the Americans were forced to temporarily halt their offensive on 4 January. The Allies renewed the offensive on 10 January, attacking the Japanese on Mount Austen as well as on two nearby ridges called the Sea Horse and the Galloping Horse. After exceptionally brutal fighting, the Allies captured all three by 23 January. At the same time, marines advanced along the north coast of the island, making some gains. The Americans lost about 250 killed in the operation while the Japanese suffered around 3,000 killed, about 12 to 1 in the Americans' favor.

=== Ke evacuation ===
On 14 January 1943, a Tokyo Express run delivered a battalion of troops to act as a rear guard for the Ke evacuation. A staff officer from Rabaul accompanied the troops to notify Hyakutake of the decision to withdraw. At the same time, Japanese warships and aircraft moved into position around the Rabaul and Bougainville areas in preparation to execute the withdrawal operation. Allied intelligence detected the Japanese movements but misinterpreted them as preparations for another attempt to retake Henderson Field and Guadalcanal.

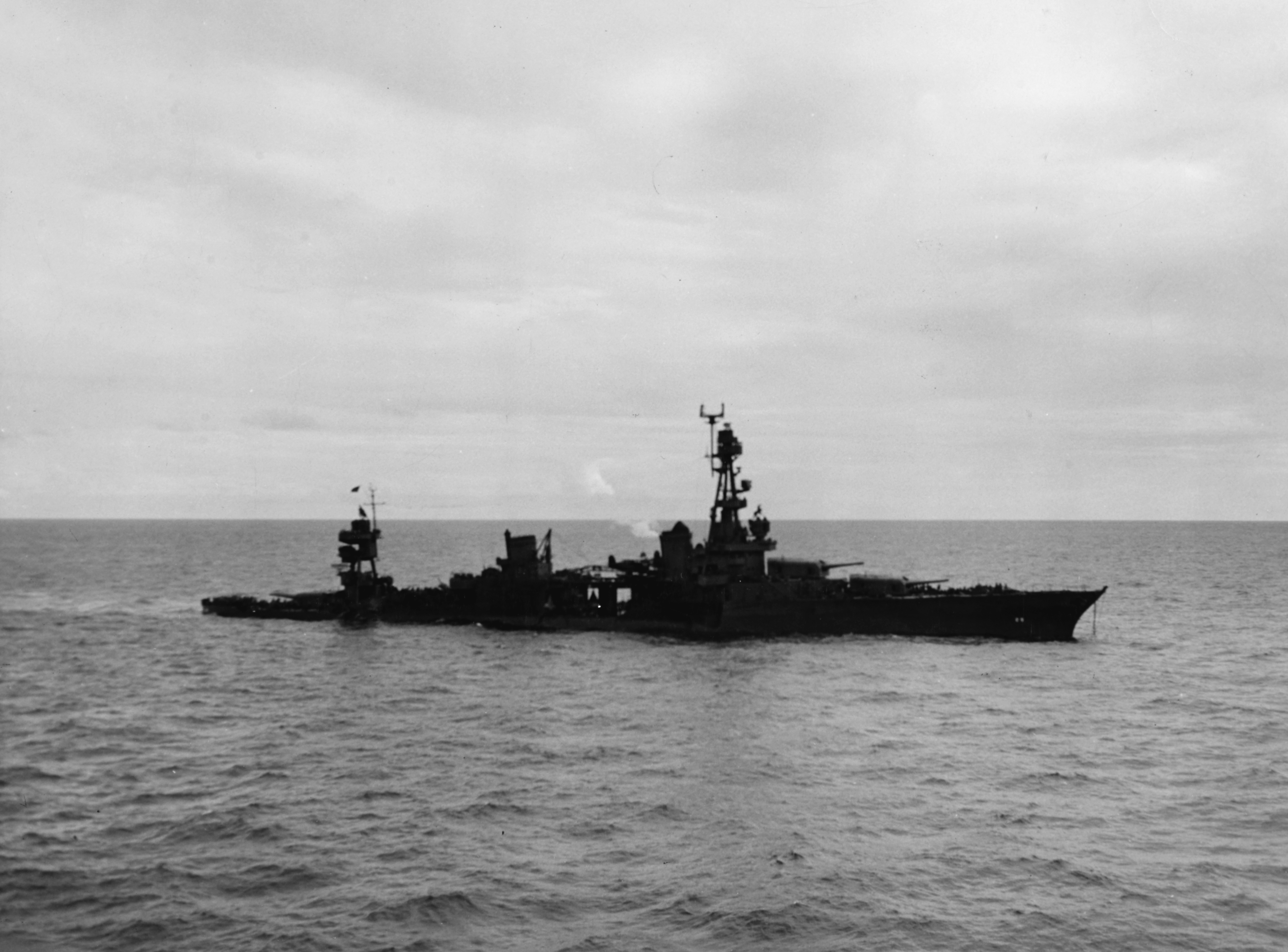
USS Chicago sinking on 30 January 1943 during the Battle of Rennell Island

Patch, wary of what he thought to be an imminent Japanese offensive, committed only a relatively small portion of his troops to continue a slow-moving offensive against Hyakutake's forces. On 29 January, Halsey, acting on the same intelligence, sent a resupply convoy to Guadalcanal screened by a cruiser task force. Sighting the cruisers, Japanese naval torpedo bombers attacked that same evening and heavily damaged the cruiser Chicago. The next day, more torpedo aircraft attacked and sank Chicago. Halsey ordered the remainder of the task force to return to base and directed the rest of his naval forces to take station in the Coral Sea, south of Guadalcanal, to be ready to counter a Japanese offensive.

In the meantime, the Japanese 17th Army withdrew to the west coast of Guadalcanal while rear guard units checked the American offensive. On the night of 1 February, a force of 20 destroyers from Mikawa's 8th Fleet under Shintarō Hashimoto successfully extracted 4,935 soldiers, mainly from the 38th Division, from the island. The Japanese and Americans each lost a destroyer from an air and naval attack related to the evacuation mission.

On the nights of 4 and 7 February, Hashimoto and his destroyers evacuated the remaining Japanese forces from Guadalcanal. Apart from some air attacks, Allied forces were still anticipating a large Japanese offensive and did not attempt to interdict Hashimoto's evacuation runs. In total, the Japanese successfully evacuated 10,652 men from Guadalcanal. Their last troops left the island on the evening of 7 February, six months to the day from when the U.S. forces first landed. Two days later, on 9 February, Patch realized that the Japanese were gone and declared Guadalcanal secure.

== Aftermath ==
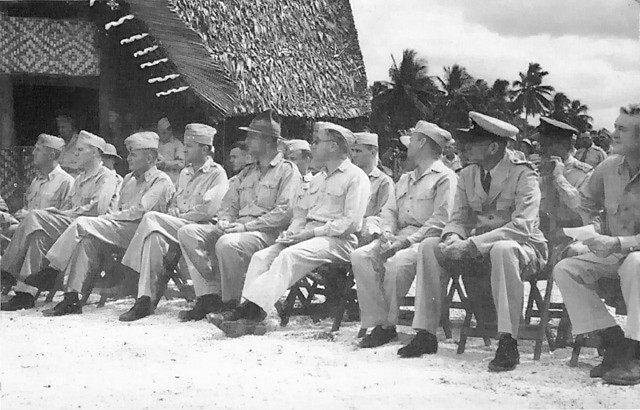
Allied commanders assemble on Guadalcanal in August 1943 to plan the next Allied offensive against the Japanese in the Solomons as part of Operation Cartwheel.

After the Japanese defeat, Guadalcanal and Tulagi were developed into major bases supporting the Allied advance further up the Solomon Islands chain. Besides Henderson Field, two additional fighter runways were constructed at Lunga Point, and a bomber airfield was built at Koli Point. Extensive naval port and logistics facilities were established at Guadalcanal, Tulagi, and Florida. The anchorage around Tulagi became an important forward base for Allied warships and transport ships supporting the Solomon Islands campaign. Major ground units were staged through large encampments and barracks on Guadalcanal before deployment further up the Solomons.

After Guadalcanal the Japanese were clearly on the defensive in the Pacific. The constant pressure to reinforce Guadalcanal had weakened Japanese efforts in other theaters, contributing to a successful Australian and American counteroffensive in New Guinea which culminated in the capture of the key bases of Buna and Gona in early 1943. The Allies had gained a strategic initiative which they never relinquished. In June, the Allies launched Operation Cartwheel which, after modification in August 1943, formalized the strategy of isolating Rabaul and cutting its sea lines of communication. The subsequent successful neutralization of Rabaul and the forces centered there facilitated the South West Pacific campaign under MacArthur and the island-hopping campaign in the Central Pacific under Nimitz, with both efforts successfully advancing toward Japan. The remaining Japanese defenses in the South Pacific Area were then either destroyed or bypassed by Allied forces as the war progressed.

=== Medal of Honor recipients ===
Army

- William G. Fournier, Sergeant – 10 January 1943 (posth.)
- Lewis Hall, Technician 5th Grade – 10 January 1943 (posth.)
- Charles W. Davis, Captain – 12 January 1943

Marine Corps

- Kenneth D. Bailey, Major – 12–13 September 1942 (posth.)
- Merritt A. Edson, Colonel – 13–14 September 1942
- John Basilone, Sergeant – 24–25 October 1942
- Mitchell Paige, Platoon Sergeant – 26 October 1942
- Joseph J. Foss, Captain (pilot) – 9 October – 19 November 1942, Jan 1943
- Alexander A. Vandegrift, Major General – 7 August – 9 December 1942

Navy

- Daniel J. Callaghan, Rear Admiral – 12–13 November 1942 (posth.)

Coast Guard

- Douglas A. Munro, Signalman First class – 27 September 1942 (posth.)

== Significance ==
=== Resources ===
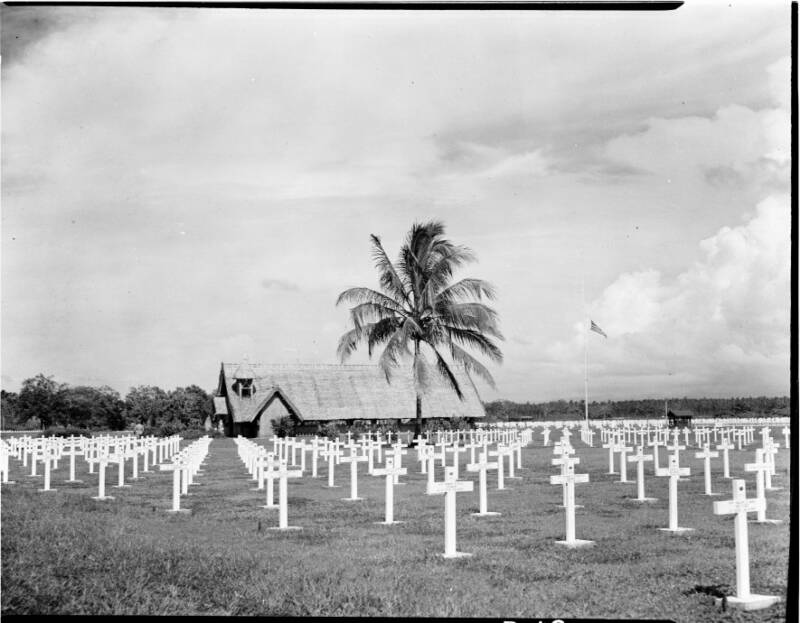
Military cemetery on Guadalcanal, 1945

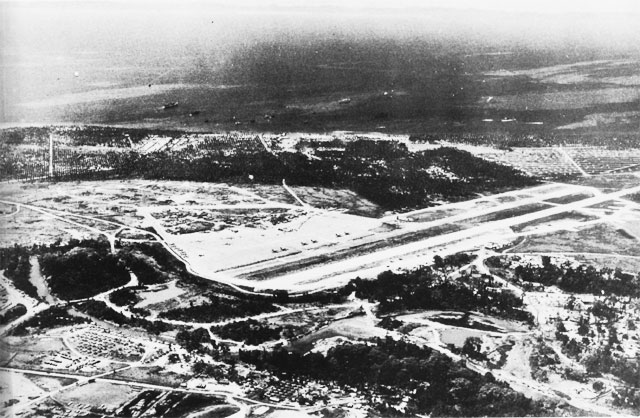
Henderson Field in August 1944

The Battle of Guadalcanal was one of the first prolonged campaigns in the Pacific Ocean theater of World War II. It strained logistical capabilities of the combatant nations. For the U.S., this need prompted the development of effective combat air transport for the first time. A failure to achieve air supremacy forced Japan to rely on reinforcement by barges, destroyers, and submarines, with very uneven results. Early in the campaign, the Americans were hindered by a lack of resources, as they suffered heavy losses in cruisers and carriers, with replacements from ramped-up shipbuilding programs still months away from materializing.

The U.S. Navy suffered such high personnel losses during the campaign that it refused to publicly release total casualty figures for years. However, as the campaign continued, and the American public became more and more aware of the plight and perceived heroism of the American forces on Guadalcanal, more forces were dispatched to the area. This spelled trouble for Japan as its military-industrial complex was unable to match the output of American industry and manpower. Thus, as the campaign wore on the Japanese were losing irreplaceable units while the Americans were rapidly replacing and even augmenting their forces.

The Guadalcanal campaign was costly to Japan strategically and in material losses and manpower. Roughly 30,000 personnel, including 25,000 experienced ground troops, died during the campaign. As many as three-quarters of the deaths were from non-combat causes such as starvation and various tropical diseases. The drain on resources directly contributed to Japan's failure to achieve its objectives in the New Guinea campaign. Japan also lost control of the southern Solomons and the ability to interdict Allied shipping to Australia. Japan's major base at Rabaul became further directly threatened by Allied air power. Most importantly, scarce Japanese land, air, and naval forces had disappeared forever into the Guadalcanal jungle and surrounding sea. The Japanese could not replace the aircraft destroyed and ships sunk in this campaign, as well as their highly trained and veteran crews, especially the naval aircrews, nearly as quickly as the Allies.

=== Strategy ===
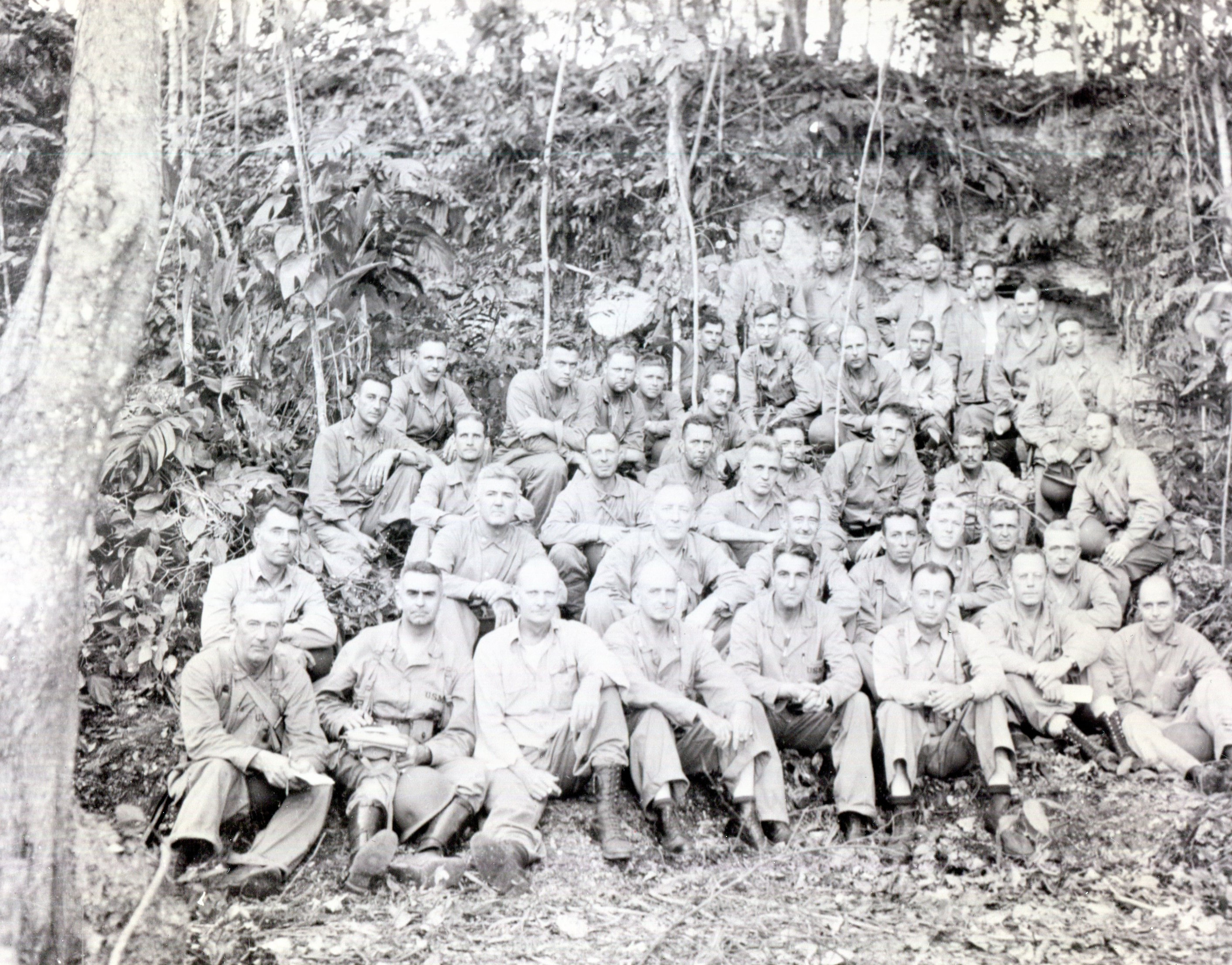
1st Marine Division Staff, Guadalcanal, August 1942

While the Battle of Midway is viewed as a turning point in the Pacific War, Japan remained on the offensive, as shown by its advances down the Solomon Islands. Only after the Allied victories in Guadalcanal and New Guinea (at Milne Bay and Buna–Gona) were these large-scale Japanese offensive actions stopped. Strategic initiative passed to the Allies, as it proved, permanently. The Guadalcanal campaign ended all Japanese expansion attempts in the Pacific and placed the Allies in a position of clear supremacy. The Allied victory at Guadalcanal was the first step in a long string of successes that eventually led to the surrender and occupation of Japan.

The "Europe first" policy agreed to by the Allies had initially only allowed for defensive actions against Japanese expansion in order to focus resources on defeating Germany. However, Admiral King's argument for the Guadalcanal invasion, as well as its successful implementation, convinced Roosevelt that the Pacific Theater could be pursued offensively as well. By the end of 1942, it was clear Japan had lost the Guadalcanal campaign, a serious blow to Japan's strategic plans for the defense of their empire and an unanticipated defeat at the hands of the Americans.

Perhaps as important as the military victory for the Allies was the psychological victory. On a level playing field, the Allies had beaten Japan's best land, air, and naval forces. After Guadalcanal, Allied personnel regarded the Japanese military with much less fear and awe than previously. In addition, the Allies viewed the eventual outcome of the Pacific War with greatly increased optimism.

Tokyo Express no longer has terminus on Guadalcanal.

—Major General Alexander Patch, USA, Commander, U.S. Forces on Guadalcanal

Guadalcanal is no longer merely a name of an island in Japanese military history. It is the name of the graveyard of the Japanese army.

— Major General Kiyotake Kawaguchi, IJA, Commander, 35th Infantry Brigade at Guadalcanal

Beyond Kawaguchi, several Japanese political and military leaders, including Naoki Hoshino, Nagano, and Torashirō Kawabe, stated shortly after the war that Guadalcanal was the decisive turning point in the conflict. Said Kawabe, "As for the turning point [of the war], when the positive action ceased or even became negative, it was, I feel, at Guadalcanal."

== Vilu War Museum and Guadalcanal American Memorial ==
The Vilu War Museum is on Guadalcanal, about 25 kilometres (16 mi) west of Honiara, the capital of the Solomon Islands. The remains of military equipment and of several aircraft can be seen in the open-air museum. Several memorials for the American, Australian, Fijian, New Zealand and Japanese soldiers who died are erected there.

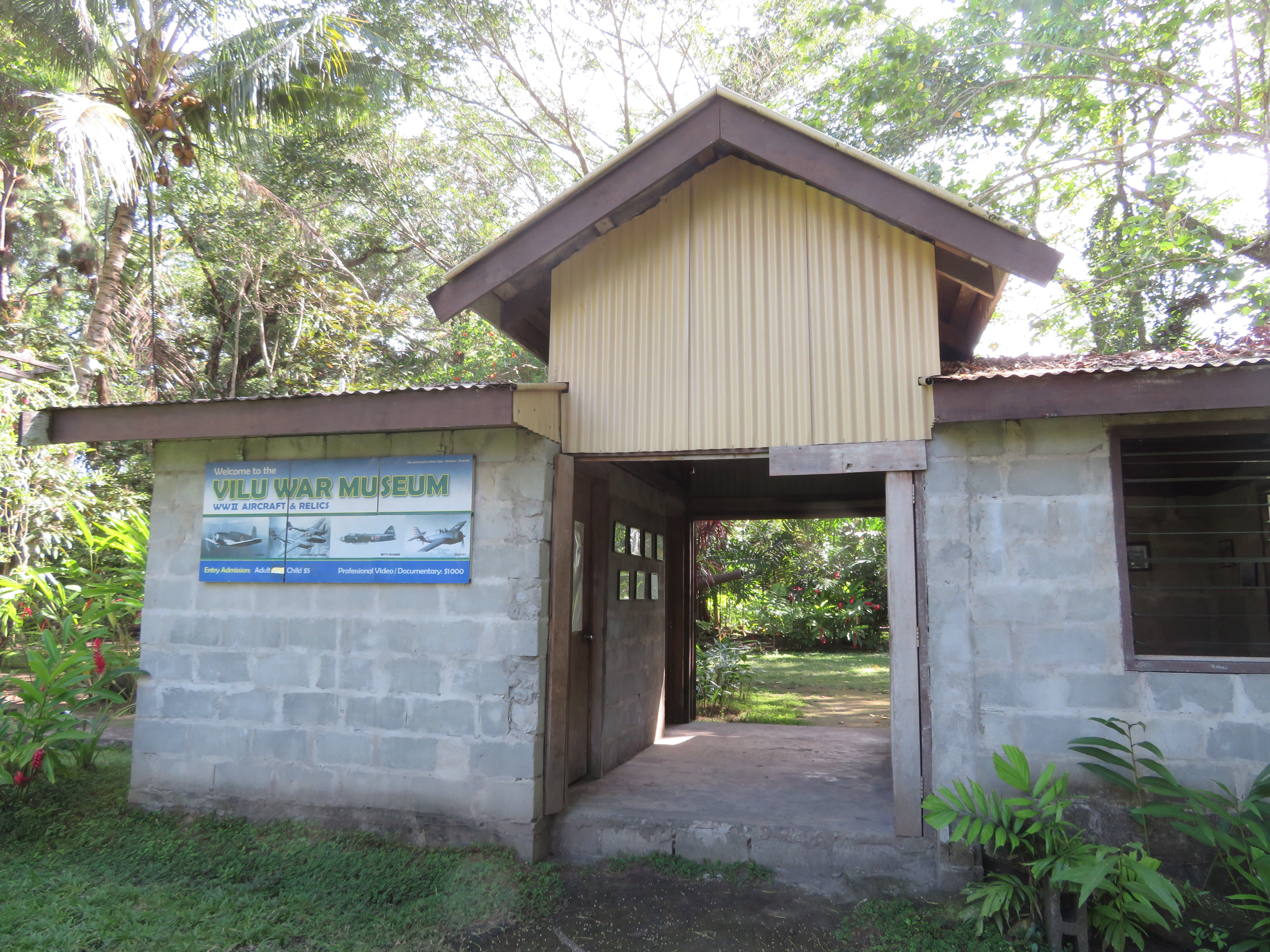
Entrance of Vilu War Museum

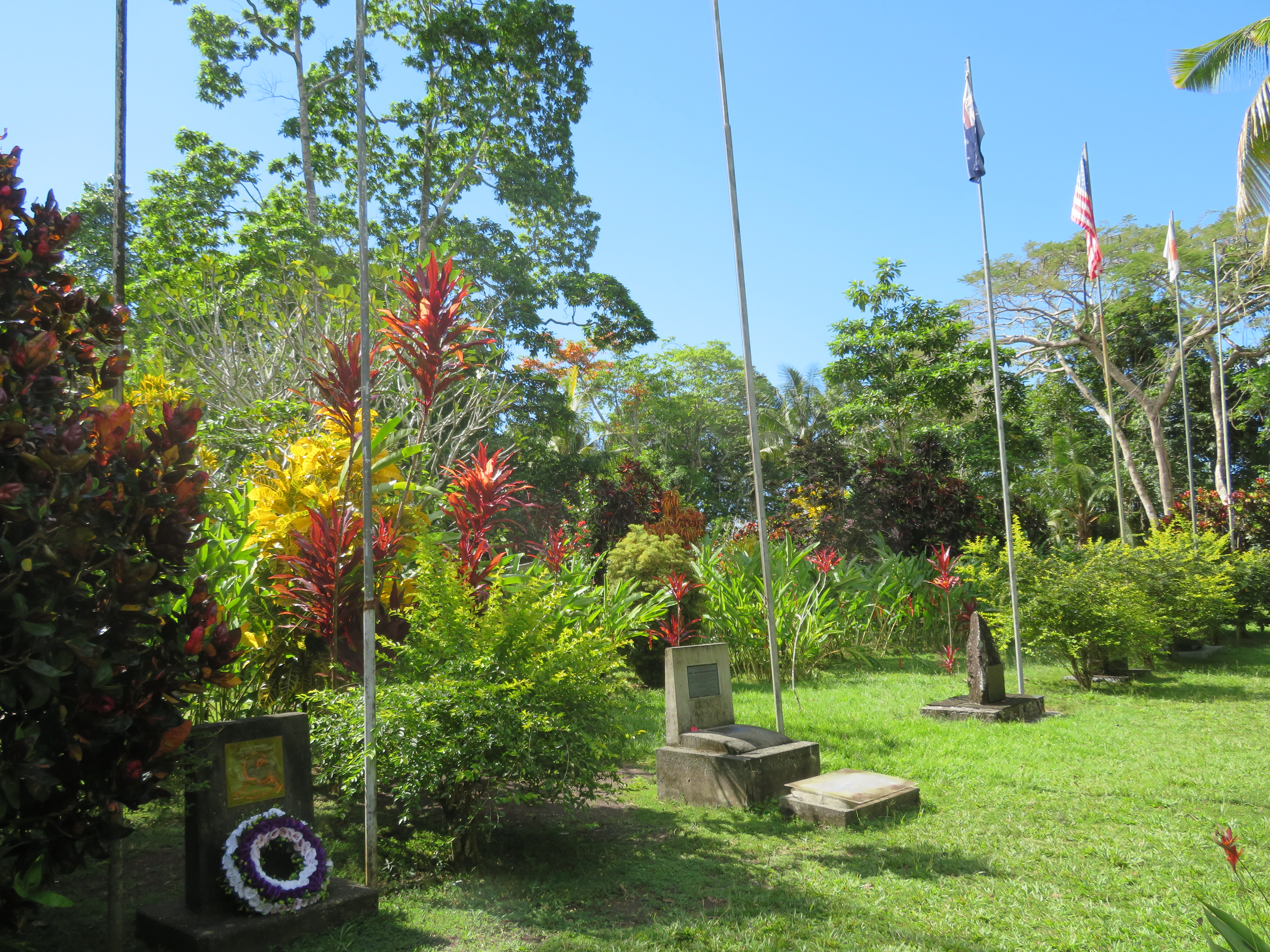
Memorials in Vilu War Museum

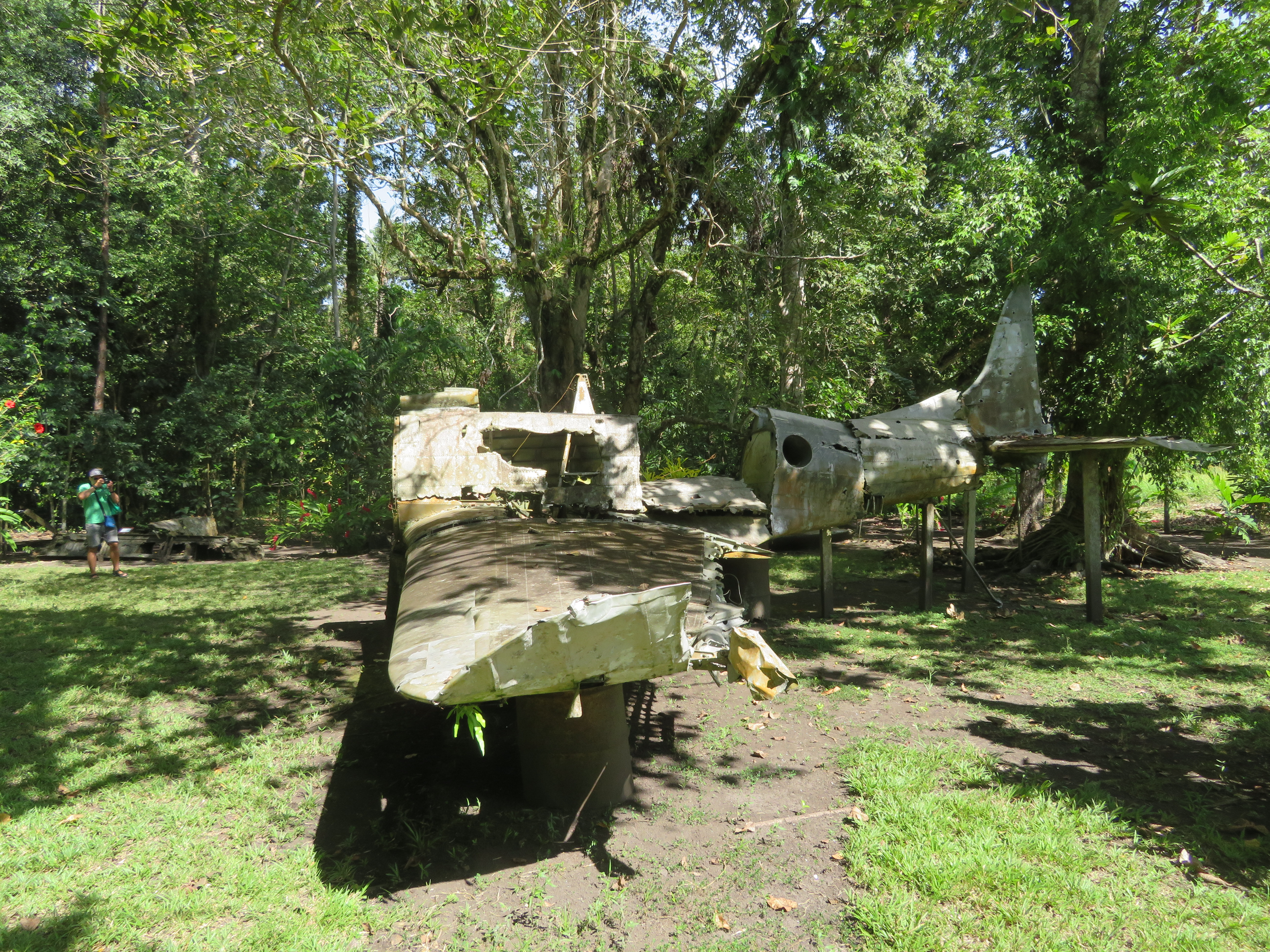
Aircraft in Vilu War Museum

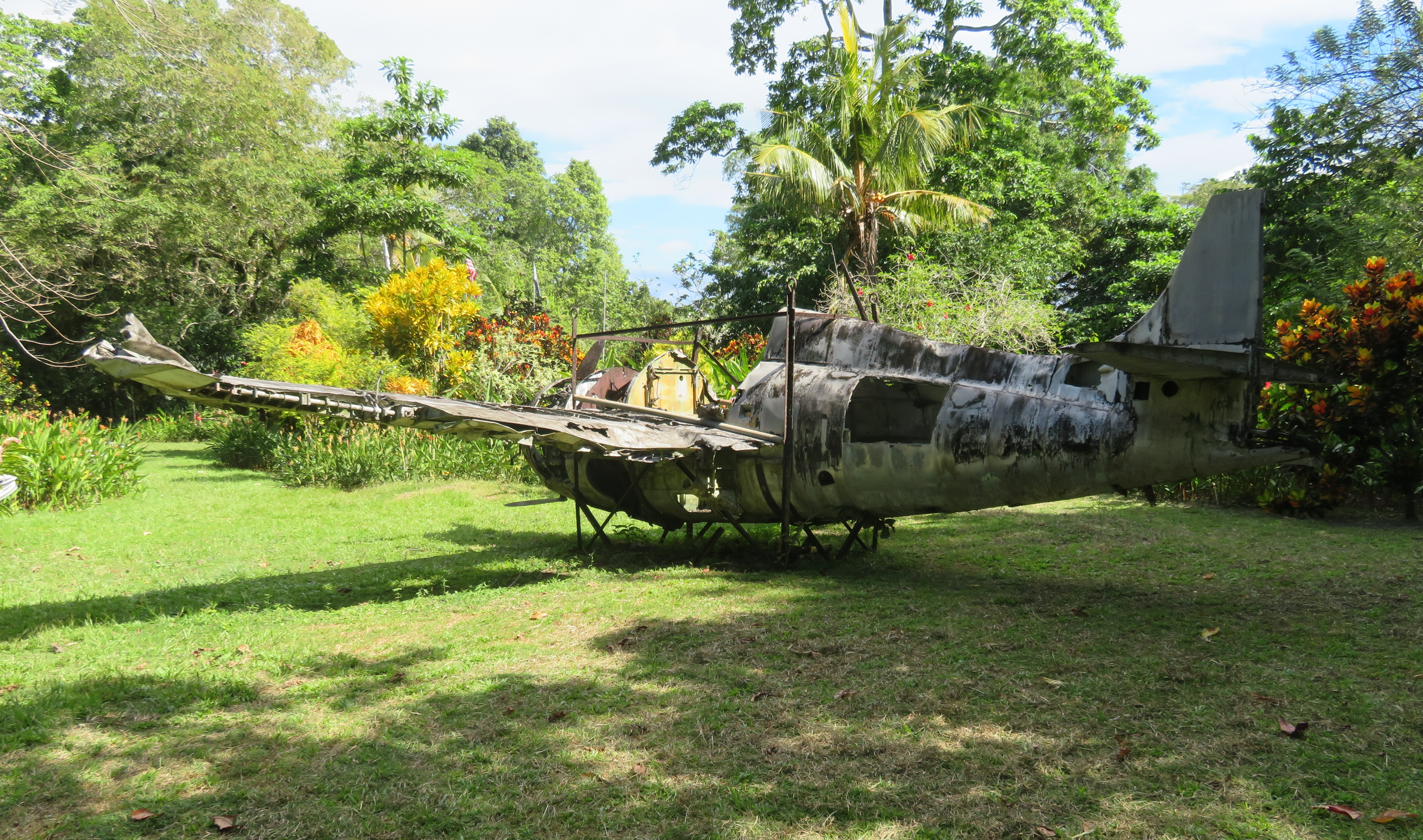
Aircraft in Vilu War Museum

To mark the 50th anniversary of the Red Beach landings, the Guadalcanal American Memorial was dedicated in Honiara on 7 August 1992.

== Remaining ordnance ==
An unknown number of unexploded bombs from the battle remain on the island, and residents of the island have been killed or severely injured by unexpected explosions from hidden explosives. The threat to people's lives from unexploded bombs remains high. The Solomon Islands police force has disposed most of the discovered bombs; however, clearance work is expensive, and the island does not have sufficient resources to clear the remaining explosives. The Solomon Islands have urged both the U.S. and Japanese governments to clear the remaining bombs from the island. In 2012, 18 years after the U.S. ended its aid program in the South Pacific, the U.S. provided funds to assist efforts to find and remove unexploded bombs. Australia and Norway also established programs to help the Solomon Islands remove unexploded bombs.

== News reporting ==
The Guadalcanal campaign was the subject of a large amount of high-quality reporting. News agencies sent some of their most talented writers, as it was the first major American offensive combat operation of the war. Richard Tregaskis, who wrote for International News Service, gained fame with the publication of his bestselling Guadalcanal Diary in 1943. Hanson Baldwin, a Navy correspondent, filed stories for The New York Times and won a Pulitzer Prize for his coverage of the early days of World War II. Tom Yarbrough wrote for the Associated Press, Bob Miller for the United Press, John Hersey for Time and Life, Ira Wolfert for the North American Newspaper Alliance (his series of articles about the November 1942 Naval Battle of Guadalcanal won him a Pulitzer Prize), Sergeant James Hurlbut for the Marine Corps, and Mack Morriss for Yank magazine. Commander Vandegrift placed few restrictions on the reporters who were generally allowed to go wherever they wanted and write what they wanted.
