= Teikichi Hori =

Admiral in the Imperial Japanese Navy

- 堀 悌吉
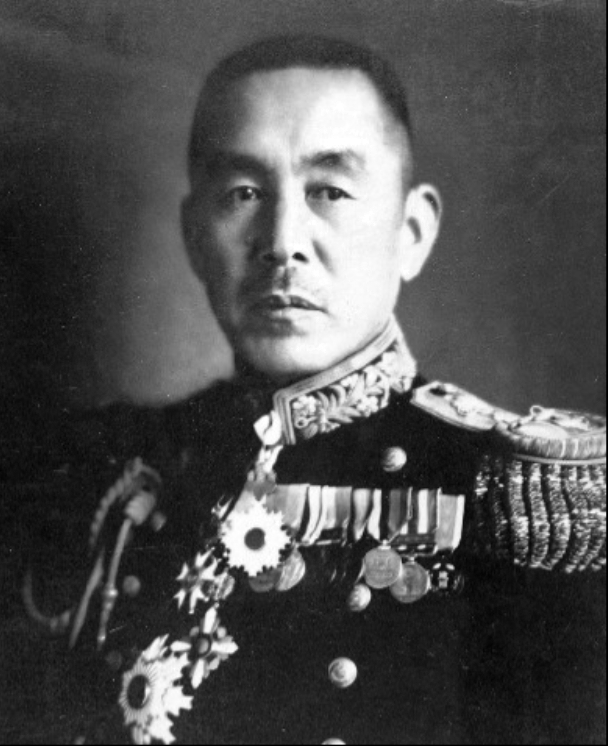
- Born: August 16, 1883; Ōita, Japan
- Died: May 12, 1959 (aged 75); Tokyo, Japan
- Military career
- Allegiance: Empire of Japan
- Branch: Imperial Japanese Navy
- Service years: 1904–1934
- Rank: Vice Admiral
- Commands: Isuzu; Nagara; Mutsu; Bureau of Naval Affairs; 3rd Squadron; 1st Squadron
- Conflicts: Russo-Japanese War; Battle of Tsushima; World War I; January 28 incident

Teikichi Hori (堀 悌吉, Hori Teikichi; August 16, 1883 – May 12, 1959) was an admiral in the Imperial Japanese Navy during the early twentieth century. During the interwar period, Hori was a prominent member of the Treaty Faction of the Navy, and opposed war against the United States and the United Kingdom. Hori and Admiral Isoroku Yamamoto were close lifelong friends.

== Biography ==
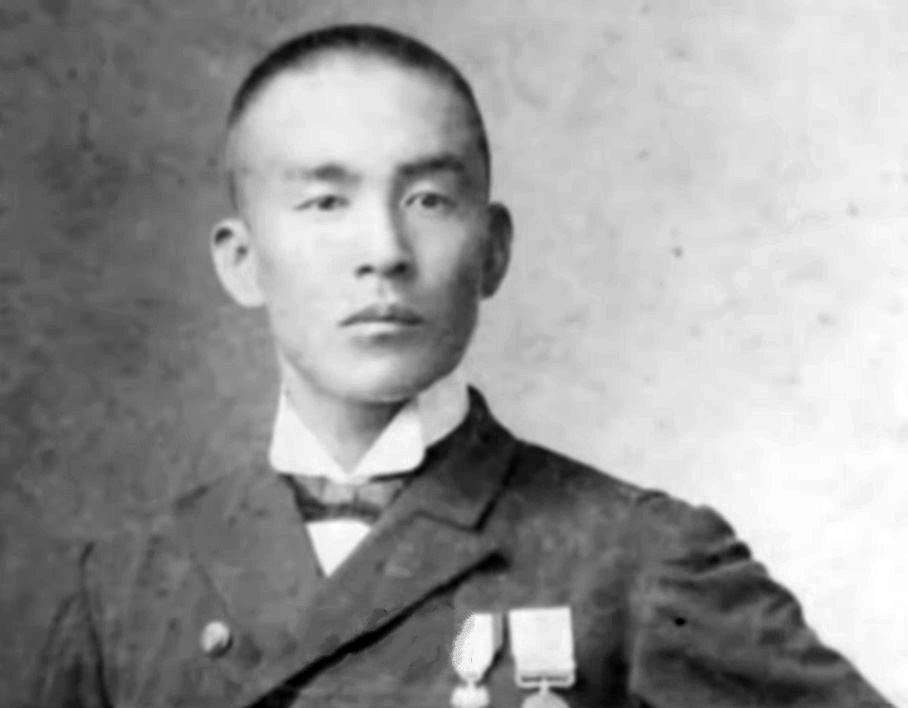
Hori in the 1900s

Teikichi Hori was born as the second son of Yasaburo Yano, who came from a samurai family from Ōita. At the age of 10, he was adopted into the Hori samurai family from Kitsuki by Masaharu Hori.

=== Early career ===
Hori entered the Imperial Japanese Naval Academy in the 32nd class, and graduated in 1904 ranked #1 in his class. There he became close friends with his classmate Isoroku Yamamoto, who would become a prominent admiral of the Imperial Japanese Navy during World War II. An accomplished student, he was admired by his peers. During the Russo-Japanese war, Hori served in Tōgō Heihachirō's flagship Mikasa, and participated in the Battle of Tsushima.

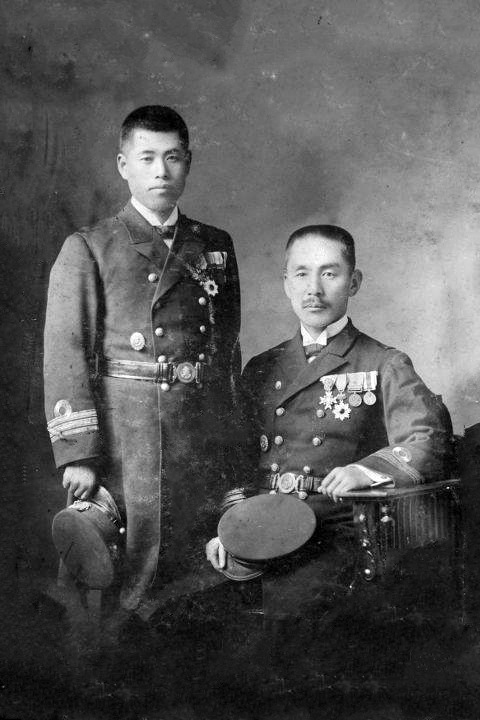
Yamamoto and Hori as young officers of the Imperial Japanese Navy, 1910s

=== 1920s–1930s ===
During the Washington Naval Treaty negotiations in 1922, he served as an attendant to Prime Minister Katō Tomosaburō, himself a former admiral. Hori was a leading figure of the Treaty Faction, a faction of the Imperial Japanese Navy that opposed an arms race between Japan and the western powers, supported the Washington Naval Treaty and hoped to restore the Anglo-Japanese Alliance through diplomacy. The stipulations of the Washington Naval Treaty limited Japan's capital ship tonnage to a 5:5:3 ratio compared with the United States and the United Kingdom. Hori and other admirals of the Treaty Faction believed that the limitations would serve Japan's interest in the long run and prevent a costly war with the western powers. Hori had previously in an article on the morality of war, wrote that he believed war to be "evil". The Treaty Faction was opposed by the more militaristic Fleet Faction of the Navy, which advocated for unlimited naval growth to challenge the United Kingdom and the United States.

In 1925 Hori served in the Imperial Japanese Navy General Staff. He attended the Geneva Naval Conference in 1927 and commanded the battleship Mutsu. In 1928 he was promoted to Rear Admiral and served as chief of staff of the 2nd Fleet.

At the London Naval Conference in 1930, the Fleet Faction pushed for the ratio of Japan's auxiliary fleet to be at least 70% of that of the United States and Britain. Hori, who was now director of the Ministry of the Navy's Military Affairs Bureau, had concluded that a war against Britain and the United States at this point was still undesirable, and assisted Navy Deputy Secretary Katsunoshin Yamanashi in concluding negotiations on the treaty. In the end, a compromise was reached between the United States and Japan, and Japan signed the London Naval Treaty which granted Japan a 10:10:7 ratio in all but "offensive" ship categories.

Japanese militarism increased in the 1930s and the Fleet Faction gradually gained the upper hand. Hori became the commander of the Third Squadron and later the First Squadron and was quite active leading a squadron of cruisers in the January 28 incident. He strictly instructed his crews to follow international law and to be careful to not inflict civilian casualties, for which he came under criticism from the fleet faction for his "cowardice." He was promoted to Vice Admiral in 1933 and once again served in the Navy General Staff. In 1934, militarists of the Fleet Faction headed by Prince Fushimi Hiroyasu and Sankichi Takahashi, gained supremacy over Navy Minister Mineo Ōsumi. That same year Hori and other Treaty Faction opposition leaders were silenced or forced to retire in the Ōsumi purge. Hori was transferred into the reserve, which effectively ended his Naval career. Upon hearing the news of Hori's purge Yamamoto was indignant, and said, "A squadron of cruisers or Teikichi Hori, which do you think is more important? The Navy is foolish for this affair." (Japan's heavy cruiser tonnage allowed by the London Naval Treaty was, when compared to the hoped tonnage, less by that of around one cruiser squadron.) As the right-wing and militaristic hardliners cemented their influence in the Navy, Yamamoto considered retiring, however, Hori convinced him to stay. In January 1936, the government announced it would withdraw from the London Naval Treaty, and Japan would enter into a naval arms race with the western powers that would lead to the Pacific War. Shigetarō Shimada, the wartime Minister of the Navy in Hideki Tojo's cabinet and one of Hori's naval academy classmates, would later claim that, "If Hori was the Navy Minister before the start of the war, he could have dealt with the situation more appropriately."

=== Civilian life ===
Hori returned to his birthplace in Ōita, where he authored a book on the Yano clan. After Hori's departure from the Navy, Yamamoto and Hori maintained their friendship. An extensive and revealing collection of letters written by Yamamoto to Hori, before and throughout World War II, is stored in the Oita Prefecture Ancient Sages Historical Archives. In 1936, he became the president of Nippi Corp., an aviation company, also known as Japan Aircraft Company. To improve their technology, he arranged for Frederick Rutland to open an office for Nippi in Santa Monica. In 1941, he became the president of Uraga Dock Company. After Yamamoto's death, those who idolized Yamamoto wanted to construct a shrine in Yamamoto's honor. Hori was opposed to the idea, believing that Yamamoto would not have liked to be worshipped as a god.

After the war, Hori avoided prosecution by SCAP authorities. He later served as an officer and advisor for several companies. In 1951, Hori was part of an advisory committee composed of former Imperial Japanese Navy officers to oversee the formation of the Japan Maritime Self-Defence Force.

Hori died in 1959 aged 75 in Setagaya, Tokyo.

== In popular culture ==
In the 2011 film Isoroku, Hori was portrayed by kabuki actor Bandō Mitsugorō X.

Letters from Yamamoto to Hori were the subject of the NHK documentary The Truth of Yamamoto.
