= Sankichi Takahashi =

- 高橋 三吉
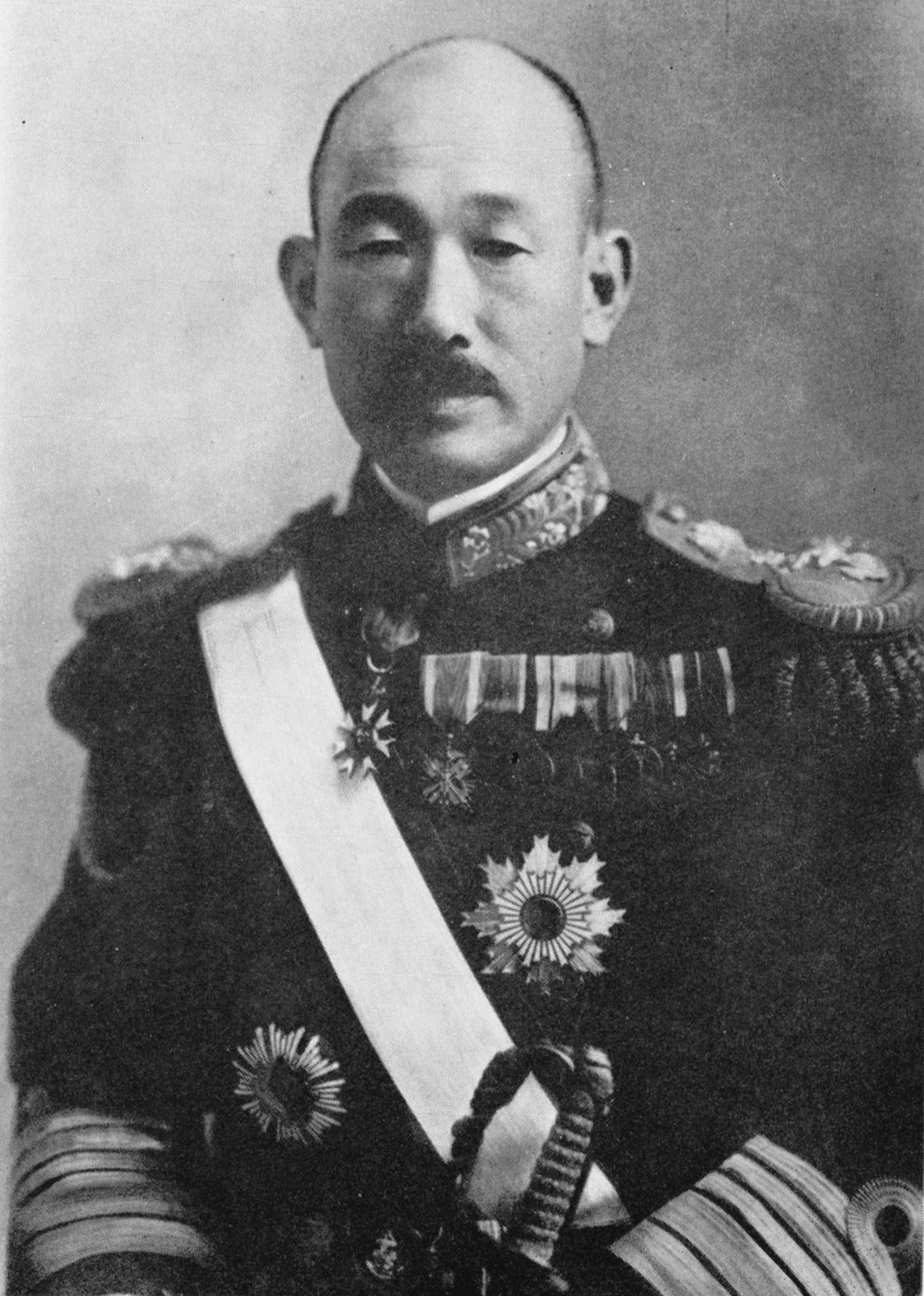
- Born: August 24, 1882; Tokyo, Japan
- Died: June 15, 1966 (aged 83); Tokyo, Japan
- Military career
- Allegiance: Empire of Japan
- Branch: Imperial Japanese Navy
- Service years: 1901–1939
- Rank: Admiral
- Commands: Aso, Fusō, Weapons and Mobilization Bureau, 1st Carrier Division, Naval War College, Vice-chief of Navy General Staff, 2nd Fleet, 1st Fleet, Combined Fleet, Naval Councillor
- Awards: Order of the Rising Sun; Order of the Sacred Treasure; Order of St Michael and St George

Sankichi Takahashi (高橋 三吉, Takahashi Sankichi; August 24, 1882 – June 15, 1966) was an Admiral of the Imperial Japanese Navy. After the Washington Naval Treaty of 1922 Takahashi, an important figure of the IJN's Fleet Faction, made a swift career, from commander of an obsolete cruiser in 1923 to commander of the Combined Fleet in 1934. He was instrumental in crushing the opposing moderate Treaty Faction but soon lost his command in another round of political turmoil.

== Career after World War One ==
In the 1920s, the Japanese Navy brass was split into an "administrative" Treaty Faction that accepted limitations imposed by the Washington Naval Treaty and a "command" Fleet Faction that opposed them. Takahashi Sankichi, promoted by his superior Kanji Kato, was on the Fleet side headed by Prince Fushimi Hiroyasu, Kanji Kato and Admiral Tōgō Heihachirō. He held brief assignments on the high seas, commanding the cruiser Aso (1923–1924) and battleship Fusō (1924–1925). and headed the Operations section of the Naval General Staff under vice chief Kanji Kato who actually ran the organization, overwhelming its mild-mannered chief Yamashita Gentarō.

Takahashi became chief of staff of the Combined Fleet in 1927, when Kanji Kato assumed command and subjected the fleet to the most rigorous and risky drills, attempting to compensate numeric constraints of the Washington Treaty with superior training. Ten years later, as the Commander of Combined Fleet, Takahashi upheld the same mentality: "If we are compelled to use the short sword to combat a foe brandishing the long sword, I am sure we shall win! We have tactics to defeat the combined fleets of Great Britain and the U.S."; "Implant in the mind of every man and every officer that Japan will be the inevitable victor in any international conflict." He continued to rally against Washington Treaty limitations during the Geneva Naval Conference of 1927, supporting the faction of Mineo Ōsumi and Tōgō Heihachirō. The moderates tried to restore their influence in the late 1920s but were finally crushed by the Fleet Faction in 1932–1933.

In 1928, Takahashi was appointed the first commander of the newly formed First Carrier Division, IJN's first air supremacy formation.

== Crushing the opposition ==
In February 1932, Takahashi was appointed vice chief of Naval General Staff through the efforts of Kanji Kato while Prince Fushimi chaired the Staff from January 1932 to March 1941. Asada wrote that Takahashi "virtually controlled the naval high command in this capacity", Ian Gow argued that Prince Fushimi was an independent and capable leader in his own right. Immediately upon promotion, Takahashi revived the plans to expand the Staff authority and reduce that of the Naval Ministry that he developed for Kanji Kato in 1922. In September 1933, the Fleet Faction prevailed and Fushimi gained clear supremacy over Navy Minister Mineo Ōsumi. In 1933–1934, the militarists silenced the opposition leaders and forced them to retire during the Osumi purge, thus gaining unchecked control of the Navy. After World War II, Takahashi recalled that "one of his aims [in the 1932 struggle for power] was to be prepared with a war with the United States"; he feared that the Shanghai Incident of 1932 could escalate into a major Japanese-American war.

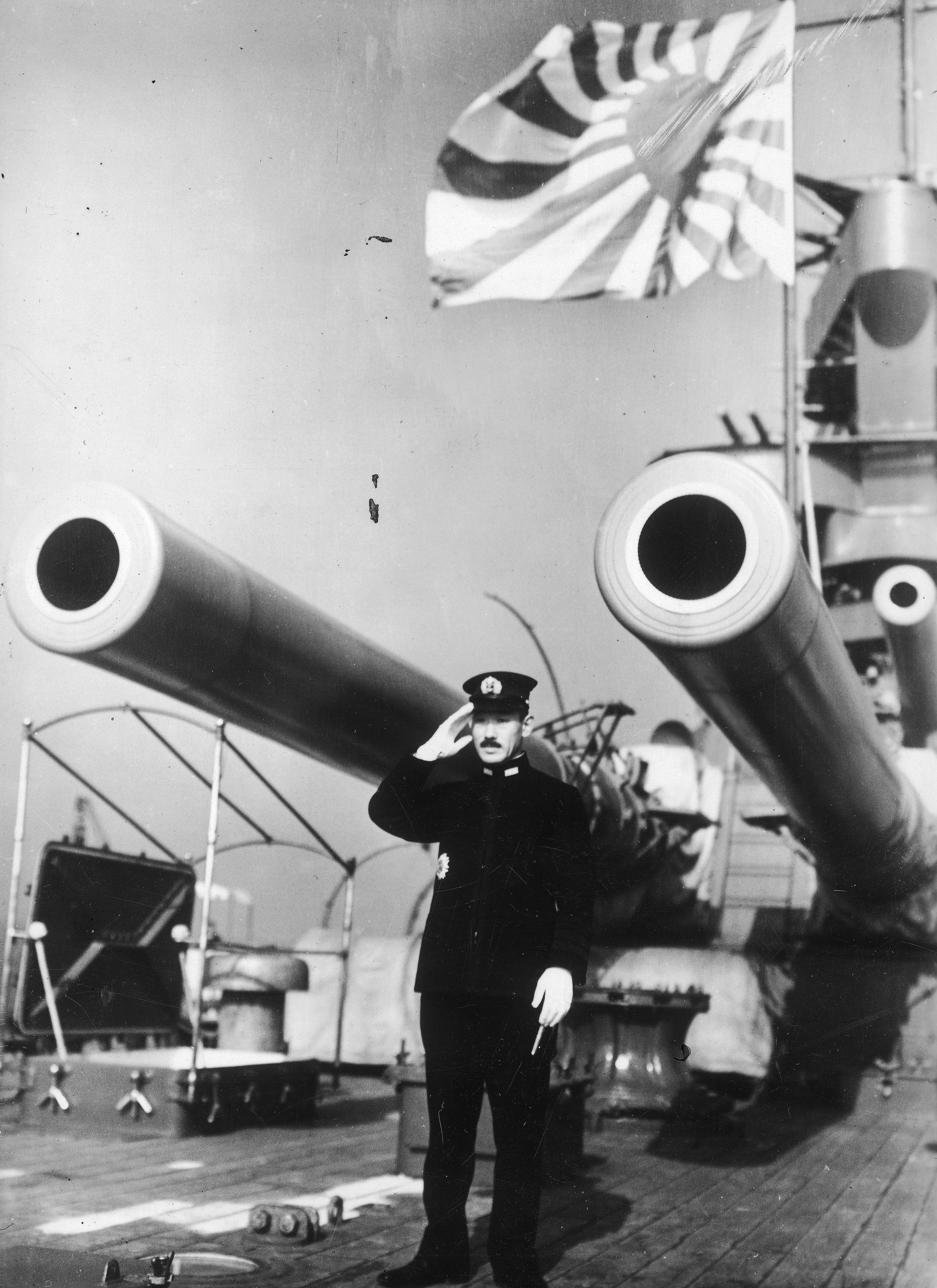
Takahashi on board the battleship Yamashiro in 1935

In November 1934, Takahashi was appointed commander of the Combined Fleet and held this command for two years. Contrary to the battleship mentality of the old-school admirals, he spoke in favor of increasing aircraft carrier arm of the Fleet; his opinion was rejected by both General Staff and the Navy Ministry and ultimately cost him his career; he was cut off from any further information on the Navy's future.

== Political statements ==
Takahashi did not have significant naval commands during World War II; Allied press called him "president of the East Asia Development Association" in 1942 and "commander of the big Kure naval station" in 1944.

As the former commander of Combined Fleet, well known in Japan and abroad and not involved in actual combat, Takahashi regularly spoke to the public on military and political topics, before and after the attack on Pearl Harbor. In 1936, he spoke that "Japan's economic advantage must be directed southward, with either Formosa or the South Sea Islands as a foothold"; in November 1940 he presented the Navy's view of the Empire's plans: "It will be constructed in several stages. In the first stage, the sphere that Japan demands includes Manchukuo, China, Indo-China, Burma, Straits Settlements, Netherlands Indies, New Caledonia, New Guinea, many islands in the West Pacific, Japan's mandated islands and the Philippines. Australia and the rest of the East Indies can be included later...".

Takahashi was an early adopter of Aikido and invited its founder Morihei Ueshiba to the Naval Staff College as a budō instructor; Ueshiba trained IJN officers for ten years. Allied war-time sources connected Takahashi Sankichi with the Black Dragon Society that allegedly infiltrated the United States and silenced political opposition in Japan. (However, the only Takahashi listed in Richard Storry's The Double Patriots: A study of Japanese Nationalism (1956), whose sources are the IMTFE transcripts and exhibits and also the Saionji-Harada memoirs, is Takahashi Hidetomi).

In the beginning of December 1945, General Douglas MacArthur placed Takahashi on the list of 59 most wanted Japanese along with Prince Nashimoto Morimasa and Admiral Soemu Toyoda. He was freed in December 1948.

== Sources ==
- Sadao Asada (2006). From Mahan to Pearl Harbor: the imperial Japanese navy and the United States. Naval Institute Press. ISBN 1-55750-042-8, ISBN 978-1-55750-042-7.
- Sadao Asada (2007). Culture shock and Japanese-American relations: historical essays. University of Minnesota Press. ISBN 0-8262-1745-1, ISBN 978-0-8262-1745-5.
- Donald M. Goldstein, Katherine V. Dillon (2004). The Pacific War papers: Japanese documents of World War II. Brassey's. ISBN 1-57488-632-0, ISBN 978-1-57488-632-0.
- Ian Gow (2004). Military intervention in pre-war Japanese politics: Admiral Katō Kanji and the 'Washington system'. Routledge. ISBN 0-7007-1315-8, ISBN 978-0-7007-1315-8.
- Ramon H. Myers, Mark R. Peattie (1987). The Japanese colonial empire, 1895-1945. Princeton University Press. ISBN 0-691-10222-8, ISBN 978-0-691-10222-1.
- Mark R. Peattie (2007). Sunburst: The Rise of Japanese Naval Air Power, 1909-1941. Naval Institute Press. ISBN 1-59114-664-X, ISBN 978-1-59114-664-3.
- Lise Abbott Rose (2007). Power at sea, Volume 2. University of Missouri Press. ISBN 0-8262-1702-8, ISBN 978-0-8262-1702-8.

Military offices
Preceded by Ōminato Naotarō	Combined Fleet & 1st Fleet; Chief-of-staff; 1 November 1926 - 1 December 1927	Succeeded by Hamano Eijirō
Preceded by Nakamura Ryōzō	Naval War College; Headmaster; 30 November 1929 - 8 February 1932	Succeeded by Hyakutake Gengo
Preceded by Suetsugu Nobumasa	2nd Fleet; Commander-in-chief; 15 November 1933 – 15 November 1934	Succeeded by Yonai Mitsumasa
Preceded by Suetsugu Nobumasa	Combined Fleet & 1st Fleet; Commander-in-chief; 15 November 1934 – 1 December 1936	Succeeded by Yonai Mitsumasa
