= Fleet Faction =

Political faction of the Imperial Japanese Navy

- 艦隊派
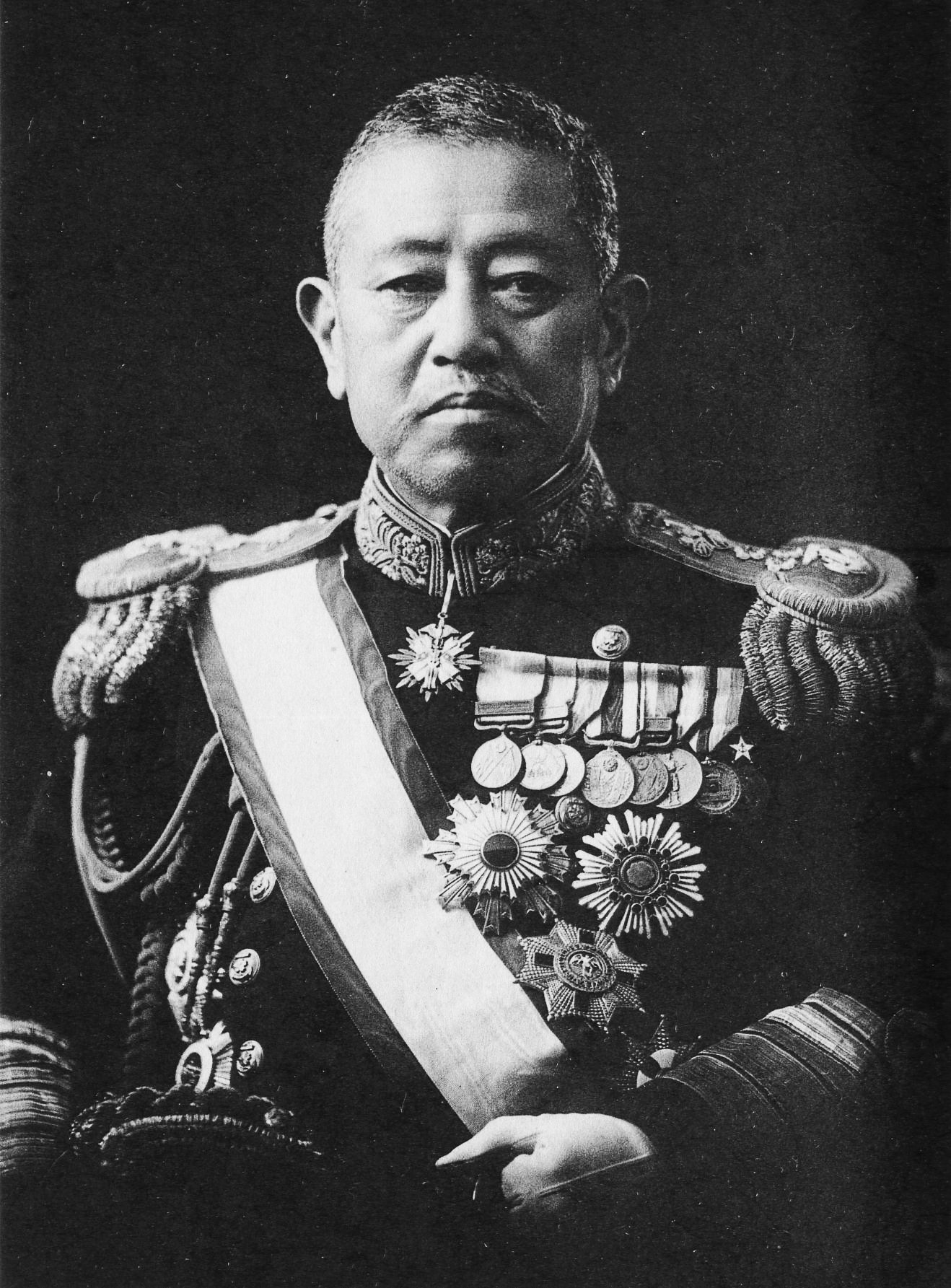
- Admiral Katō Kanji, who led opposition to the Washington Naval Treaty, was regarded as the leader of the faction.
- Other name: Kantaiha
- Founded: 1920s
- Dissolved: c. 1940
- Active regions: Japan
- Ideology: Militarism, nanshin-ron

The Fleet Faction (Japanese: 艦隊派, romanized: kantai-ha) was an informal political faction within the Imperial Japanese Navy active in the 1920s and 1930s. The kantai-ha sought to drastically increase the size of the Imperial Japanese Navy in order to reach force parity with the fleets of the United States Navy and Royal Navy in the Western Pacific Ocean. The group advocated for the kantai kessen, a doctrine specifying a need for larger warships and larger-caliber guns.

Opposition to the Washington Naval Treaty led to the formation of the Fleet Faction, which was led by Admiral Kato Kanji. The Fleet Faction was formed in reaction to the Treaty Faction, who had successfully negotiated the terms of the treaty. The treaty would lead to increasing militancy and opposition to the established naval staff, who were seen as defeatists and endangering Japanese national security. Further opposition to the Geneva Naval Conference and London Naval Treaty fueled increasingly hawkish demands for naval expansion by the kantai-ha, leading to a split between junior and senior naval officers in the Navy Ministry. During the rise of statism in Shōwa Japan, the Fleet Faction consolidated power in a series of purges and political violence against treaty proponents, eventually resulting in the abrogation and denunciation of the Washington Treaty by Japan in 1934 and Japan's withdrawal from the Second London Naval Treaty conference in 1936.

== Meiji–Taishō era naval buildup ==
During the Meiji Restoration, the Imperial government undertook a series of modernizations of the officer corps. This included European modernization and education of Japanese naval officers, with the Tracey Mission establishing a naval school for some 100 cadets in 1867. After the First Sino-Japanese War, Japan acquired a significant indemnity, using it to undertake an unprecedented naval buildup. Japan doubled its naval personnel and increased its naval tonnage from 30,000 prewar to 250,000 tons in 1903. Japan's naval buildup elevated it to the fourth largest naval power by the completion of the Six-Six Fleet plan.

=== Rise of the Big Gun faction ===
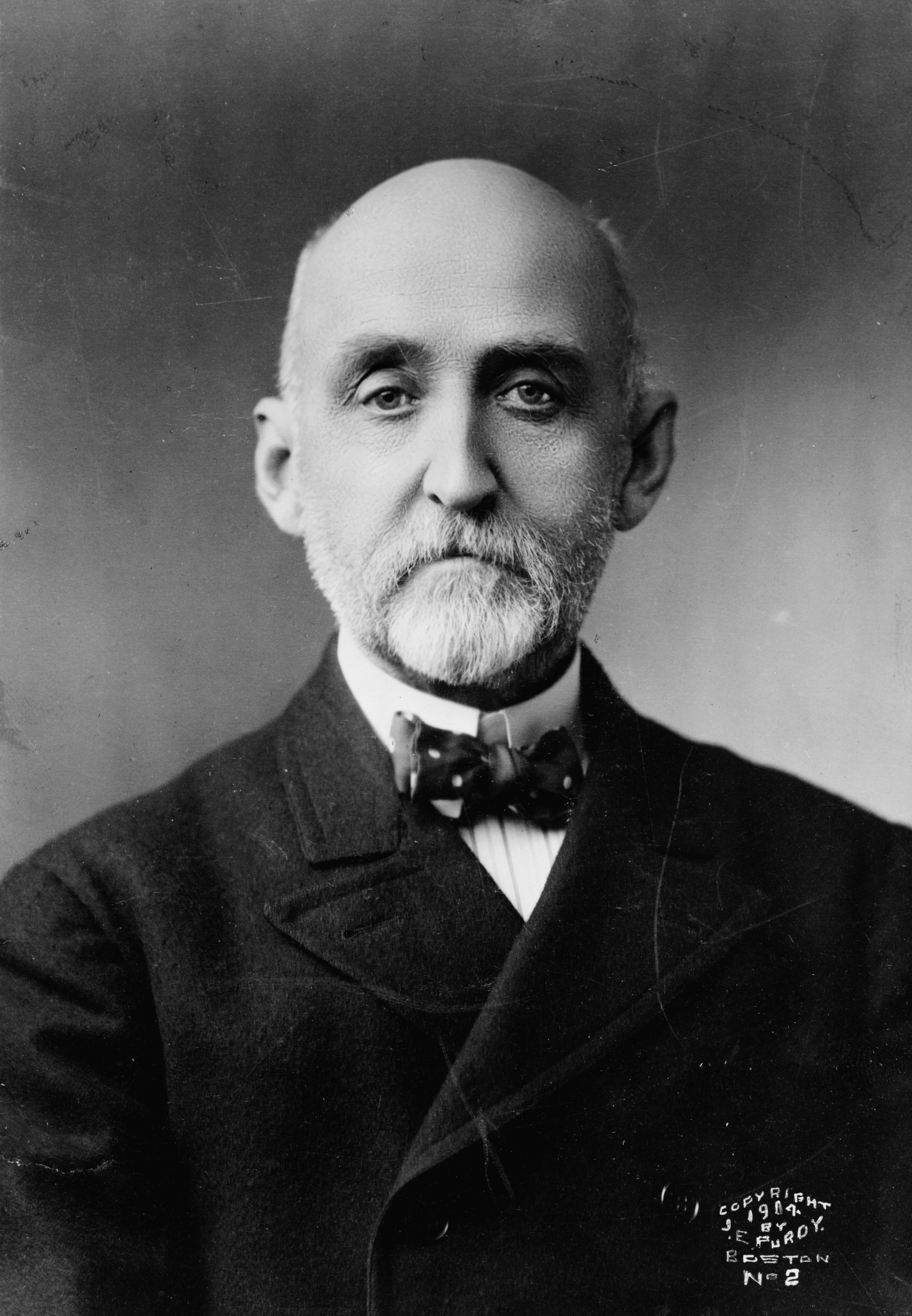
Alfred Thayer Mahan, whose work heavily influenced Japanese naval policy

Following the Russo-Japanese War, the proponents of a larger battle line fleet were vindicated as they saw the Battle of Tsushima as a textbook Mahanian "Decisive Battle". A number of the battles in that war were fought at a greater distance than many had thought possible, showing the advantage in having guns that could fire the maximum distances. Satō Tetsutarō, who would become a future influence on Japanese naval strategy in the interwar period, established the principle of the Big Gun based on his inferences from Tsushima. Tetsutaro's writing would heavily influence Kato Kanji's thinking in regards to a future maritime conflict with the United States, with his postulations on a 70% ratio in total naval strength vis-à-vis the USN influencing later naval opposition to arms control.

Further following Mahanian thinking in regards to a "hypothetical enemy", the navy ministry, under Kato Tomosaburo, assigned the United States the designation of a "budgetary enemy" and argued that Japanese naval strength should be expanded and based on the US Pacific Fleet's armament strength. The IJN also obtained confidential information in regards to the US's plans for a war against Japan in the Pacific (War Plan Orange), further vindicating the navy's stance on the decisive battle doctrine and the 70% strength ratio. Such doctrine regarding the United States as a primal budgetary threat to the IJN became internalized and justified within the naval ministry as "maintaining balance" with a US navy that sought to become "second to none".

==== Deterioration of Japanese relations with the West ====
Japanese expansionism significantly worsened Anglo-Japanese relations and American-Japanese relations in the 1920s. The Japanese occupation of the Shandong Peninsula worsened the Shandong problem with the Republic of China. The Japanese imposition of the 21 Demands and Nishihara Loans further worsened relations with the west, which combined with evolving British Commonwealth interests and the looming Washington Naval Conference would result in the collapse of the Anglo-Japanese Alliance.

=== Debate over the Eight-Eight Fleet ===
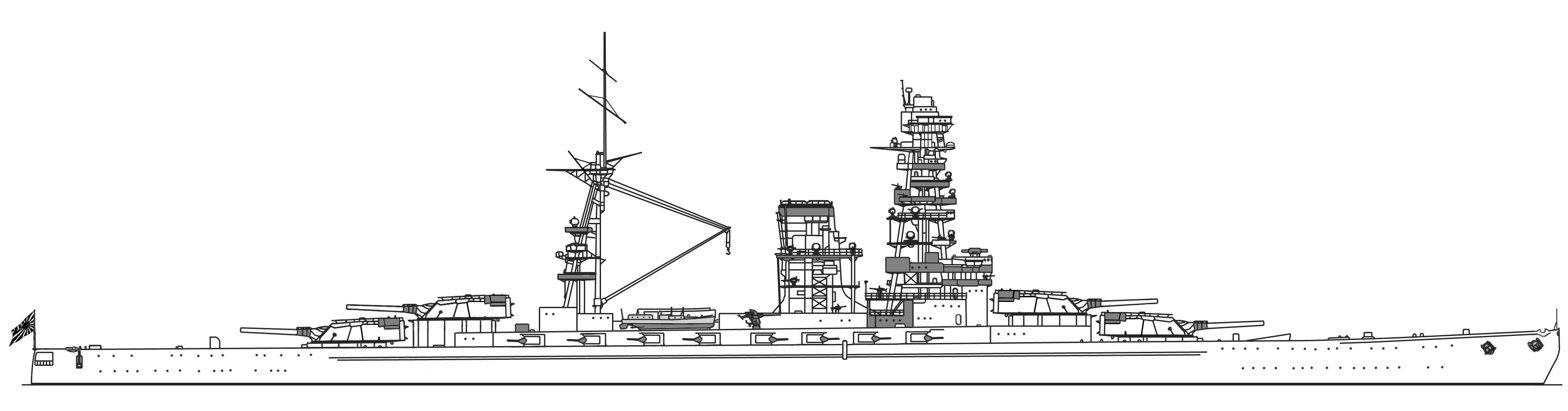
Design concept of the Number 13-class battleships, part of the Eight-Eight Fleet

The First World War gave the Japanese navy a cause for increasing the size of its budgetary requests. The Japanese seizure of strategically valuable territories in the Central Pacific, administrated by the South Seas Mandate, changed the strategic calculus of the navy in the event of a war with a major naval power. The IJN also undertook the construction of secret military installations in Micronesia, in violation of demilitarization laws concerning the administration of the region. The strategic calculus of the navy was the creation of "unsinkable aircraft carriers", attempting to nullify the US Navy's advantage in tonnage via the fortification of Japan's interior lines in the Western Pacific. Following Woodrow Wilson's renewal of a shipbuilding program increasing the strength of the US Navy, the Imperial Diet, pressured by the IJN, approved a motion calling for the expansion of Japan's fleet to include eight battleships and eight battlecruisers. Immediately, issues with the fleet expansion plan surfaced because of the cost of procurement of such expensive vessels. Kato Tomosaburō, the architect of the 8-8 fleet plan, stated that competing with the industrial and budgetary hegemony that the United States had, constituted a feat that Japan could not achieve. Tomosaburo concluded that the cost of constructing such a large fleet would amount to financial ruin for Japan, which was under the strain of a post war economic recession. The navy ministry, trying to avoid an arms race while under adverse financial and budgetary restrictions, accepted an invitation to the Washington Naval Conference. The Japanese diet concurrently passed a resolution calling for a reduction in arms spending, which had grown to 48% of Japan's budgetary expenses.

== Washington Naval Treaty ==
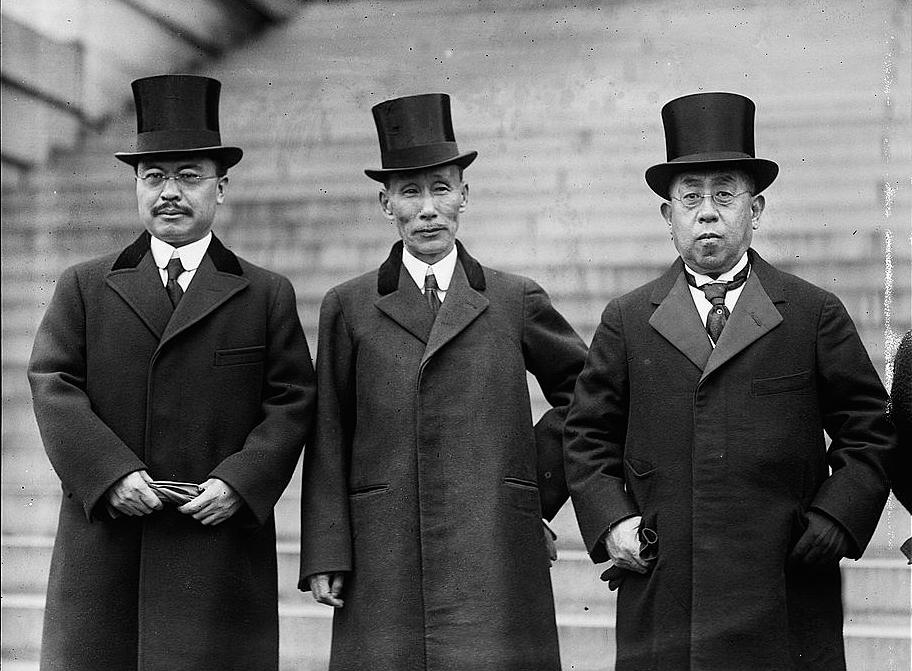
Tomosaburo with Iesato Tokugawa and Kijuro Shidehara at the Washington Naval Conference

Kato Tomosaburo was appointed head of negotiations by Prime Minister Hara Kei, as Tomosaburo had a powerful reputation and was capable of restraining the navy from making outrageous demands. During the negotiations at the conference, Tomosaburo and Kato Kanji split on multiple issues, representing the Treaty and Fleet Factions, respectively. Both had, initially, a baseline "absolute requirement" for 70 percent naval strength vis-à-vis the United States Navy. Kanji personally opposed the ratio as a matter of principle, arguing that Japan should have total parity, but stated that the 70 percent ratio was a "maximum concession". The two Kato's were both shocked by the demands of the US representatives, who demanded a ratio of 60 percent strength. The proposed treaty limited the total capital ship tonnage of each of the signatories. No single ship could exceed 35,000 tons, and no ship could carry a gun in excess of 16 inches. Only two large aircraft carriers were permitted per nation. No new fortifications or naval bases could be established, and existing bases and defenses could not be improved in external territories and possessions specified in the treaty. The tonnage allotment to Japan was based on a 5:5:3 ratio, compared with the United States and United Kingdom, with the justification being that these two countries needed to maintain fleets on more than one ocean whereas Japan had only the Pacific Ocean. Tomosaburo, though "dumbfounded", readily accepted the US's terms in return for a guarantee of the status quo on US bases in Guam and the Philippines. In contrast, Kanji vehemently opposed the proposal. Kanji argued that the treaty was "outrageous" and stated that the US was attempting to enforce its hegemony upon Japan through arms control, calling the treaty an "unequal treaty" and an "unbearable humiliation". Kanji was reinforced by the Naval Affairs Research Committee for the League of Nations, which stated that any ratio under the 70 percent strength limit was non negotiable. Kanji went through private channels without informing Tomosaburo, moving to subvert Tomosaburo's senior position at the conference by wiring the Naval General Staff his dissident views. Tomosaburo had already told the senior naval staff, including admiral Tōgō Heihachirō, his position, resulting in Kanji's maneuver being ultimately futile. (Note: Gow disputes this account on Pg 137 of Gow, 1994. Gow argues that Kanji and Tomosaburo were cooperative in regards to the 70% ratio, with Kanji seeking the strength ratio explicitly at the wishes of Tomosaburo) By the time of the treaty's signing, Kanji shouted "As far as I am concerned, war with America starts now, We'll get our revenge over this, by god!. (Note: Gow states that Kanji was privately dissatisfied but publicly praised the treaty, in contradiction of Asada's account.) Tomosaburo's subordinates in the Navy Ministry would continue the "Washington Naval Treaty System" after his death from colon cancer, weakening opposition to the Kantaiha.

=== Aftermath of the naval treaty ===
The navy gained internal political influence after the naval treaty, allotting it significant influence over the Seiyukai party, which advocated for an increased naval budget. The navy's influence over the Seiyukai allowed them to manufacture a sense of crisis regarding the strength of Japanese naval power, creating pro navy propaganda and influencing the public in order to support "navalism". The Fleet Faction's efforts would not go without merit, as the public's support for naval expansion increased year over year. Kanji was appointed commander in chief of the Combined Fleet in August 1927, where he instituted massive training exercises to make up for the navy's inferiority in tonnage with the western powers. Kanji described US naval exercises in 1925 as a "naked demonstration of the American naval buildup against Japan" and a "full-dress rehearsal for a transpacific offensive". Tomosaburo, in the aftermath of the inter-naval bickering of the treaty tried to reform the navy by installing civilian ministers as administrators. His death would result in the failure of his attempted reforms, though the treaty provisions negotiated by Japan would be enforced. As the Treaty faction retained significant influence in the IJN, it supported subsequent arms control agreements including the Geneva Naval Conference and London Naval Treaty. By the signature of the London Naval Treaty in 1930, Harold Quigley from Current History concluded that the Japanese military had moved to "greater democratic rule" with the "defeat of the naval die-hards" as Japan was maintaining its pro treaty position. However, a growing rift was opening between the commanders of the Combined Fleet and the Navy Ministry. Yamamoto Eisuke, who was the commander of the Combined Fleet in 1930, protested that the fleet was constantly engaged in exercises because of its inability to match Western armaments. Yamamoto described the officials in the navy ministry as "civilian desk officers" and angrily tied the navy's failings to the Washington Conference and Kato Tomosaburo. The conflict between the two factions continued to boil as Kato Kanji resigned in the aftermath of the 1930 treaty, refusing to accept the naval board's negotiated position on tonnage strength.

=== The Fleet Faction's seizure of power ===
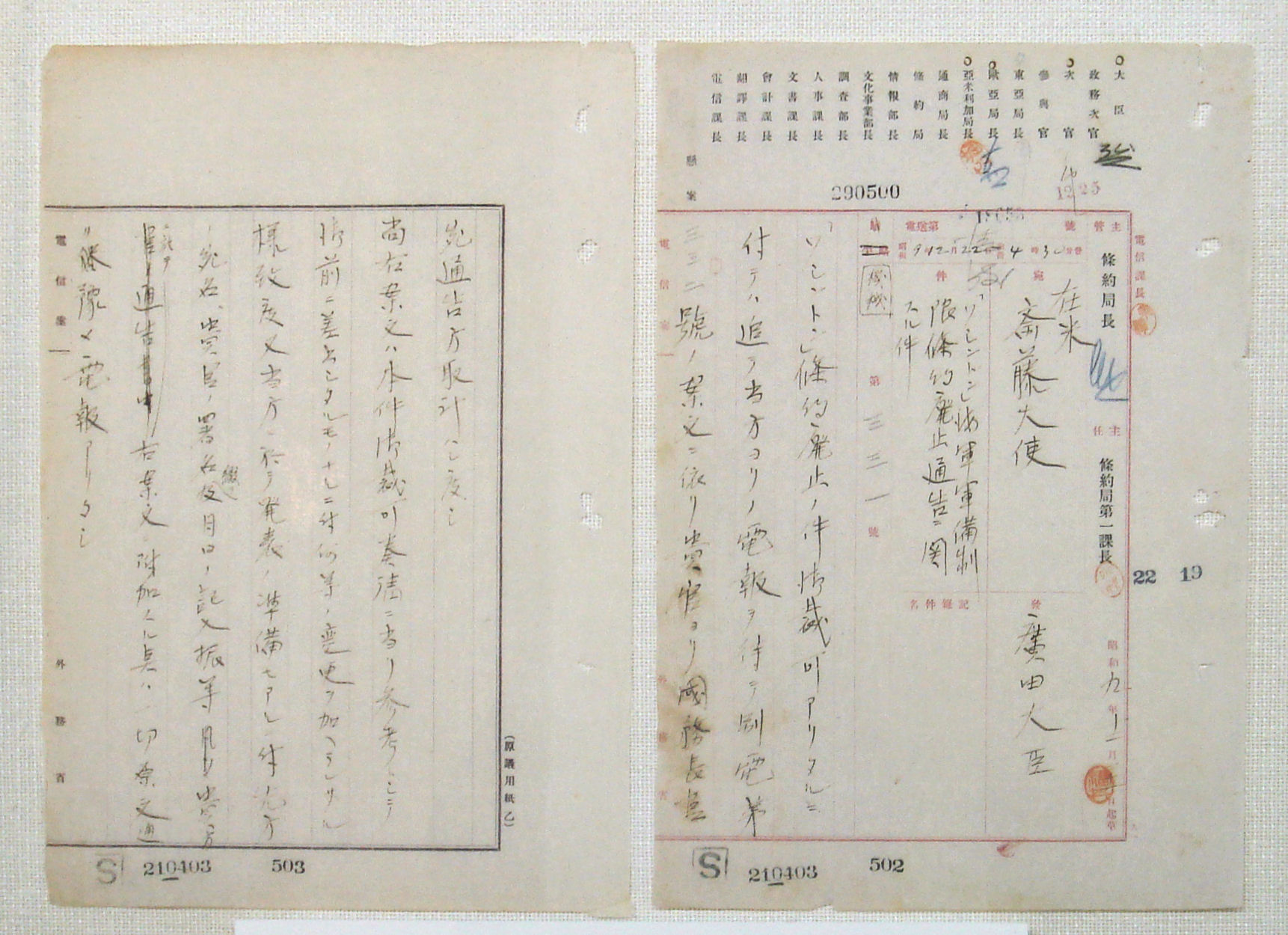
Japanese denunciation of the Treaty, 1934

In the 1930s, as the Fleet Faction's influence steadily increased due to the militarist takeover of the armed forces, the "pragmatic" politicians and naval officers of the treaty faction were sidelined in favor of the expansionists. Former naval minister Takabe Takereshi was forcibly retired to the reserves in the early 1930s and was subject to an assassination attempt by junior officers in the navy. "Pragmatic officers" such as Teikichi Hori and Yamanashi Katsunoshin were dismissed from high command by Mineo Osumi, who was under the influence of the faction.

With hawks in control of the IJN, the IJN allowed arms control agreements negotiated by members of the treaty faction to expire and began requesting increasingly higher budget appropriations from the central government in order to expand the size of the fleet. The militarists also announced the formulation of a "Pan-Asiatic doctrine", termed the Amau doctrine, claiming hegemony in East Asia against "western exploitation". Japanese representatives to the Second London Naval Convention walked out of the convention, resulting in the failure of a substantive treaty. After the expiration of the Washington Treaty, Japan openly engaged in a naval buildup, expanding the tonnage of its navy significantly. Japan's naval buildup triggered an arms race with the United States, which historian Stephen Pelz described as the "Race to Pearl Harbor".

=== Contributions to Japanese militarism ===
The contention over the Washington Naval Treaty resulted in increased military dissatisfaction with the civilian government, who had collaborated with Tomosaburo to reduce naval expenditures—pressuring Japan to accept the terms of the naval treaty. Prime Minister Osachi Hamaguchi was assassinated by militarists enraged by his signing of the London Naval Treaty in 1930. Japanese naval officers also participated in the League of Blood Incident, assassinating Junnosuke Inoue and Dan Takuma. Junior officers then attempted to instigate a coup d'etat against the civilian government in the May 15 incident, assassinating prime minister Inukai Tsuyoshi and attempted to assassinate Charlie Chaplin in order to cause a war with the United States.

== Notes and references ==
=== Bibliography ===
==== Journals ====
- Schencking, Charles (1998). "Bureaucratic Politics, Military Budgets and Japan's Southern Advance: The Imperial Navy's Seizure of German Micronesia in the First World War". War in History. 5 (3): 308–326. JSTOR 26007298.
- Hirama, Yôichi (1991). "Japanese Naval Preparations for World War II". Naval War College Review. 44 (2): 63–81. JSTOR 44638027.
- Trotter, Ann (1971). "Tentative Steps for an Anglo-Japanese Rapprochement in 1934". Modern Asian Studies. 8 (1): 59–83. doi:10.1017/S0026749X00004753. JSTOR 311627. S2CID 145630455.
- Asada, Sadao (1993). "The Revolt against the Washington Treaty: The Imperial Japanese Navy and Naval Limitation, 1921-1927". Naval War College Review. 46 (3): 82–97. JSTOR 44637473.
- Nomura, Kichisaburo (1935). "Japan's Demand for Naval Equality". Foreign Affairs. 13 (2): 196–203. doi:10.2307/20030656. JSTOR 20030656.
- Johnson, William (1972). "Naval Diplomacy and the Failure of Balanced Security in the Far East—1921–1935". Naval War College Review.
- Perry, John (1966). "Great Britain and the Emergence of Japan as a Naval Power". Monumenta Nipponica. 21 (3/4): 305–321. doi:10.2307/2383375. JSTOR 2383375.
- Hurd, Archibald (1903). "The Growing Naval Power of Japan". The North American Review. 177 (563): 570–577. JSTOR 25119466.
- Bose, Himadri (2020). "Influence of Alfred Thayer Mahan on Japanese Maritime Strategy" (PDF). Journal of Defence Studies.
- Quigley, Harold (1930). "The Far East". Current History. 32 (5): 1024–1027. doi:10.1525/curh.1930.32.5.1024. JSTOR 45339059.
- Goedeken, Edward (1978). "The 1927 Geneva Naval Disarmament Conference". Iowa State University.

==== Books ====
- Asada, Sadao (2013). From Mahan to Pearl Harbor: The Imperial Japanese Navy and the United States. Naval Institute Press. ISBN 9781612512952.
- Adams, John (2008). If Mahan Ran the Great Pacific War: An Analysis of World War II Naval Strategy. Indiana University Press. ISBN 9780253000293.
- Evans, David. C; Peattie, Mark (1997). Kaigun: Strategy, Tactics, and Technology in the Imperial Japanese Navy, 1887–1941. Naval Institute Press. ISBN 0-87021-192-7.
- Gow, Ian (2004). Military Intervention in Pre-War Japanese Politics: Admiral Kato Kanji and the 'Washington System'. Routledge. ISBN 9781135795917.
- Schencking, Charles (2005). Making Waves: Politics, Propaganda, and the Emergence of the Imperial Japanese Navy, 1868-1922. Stanford University Press.
- Pelz, Stephen (2013). The Failure of the Second London Naval Conference and the Onset of World War II. Harvard University Press.
