= Mineo Ōsumi =

Japanese admiral (1876–1941)

Senior Second Rank Baron Mineo Ōsumi
- 大角 岑生
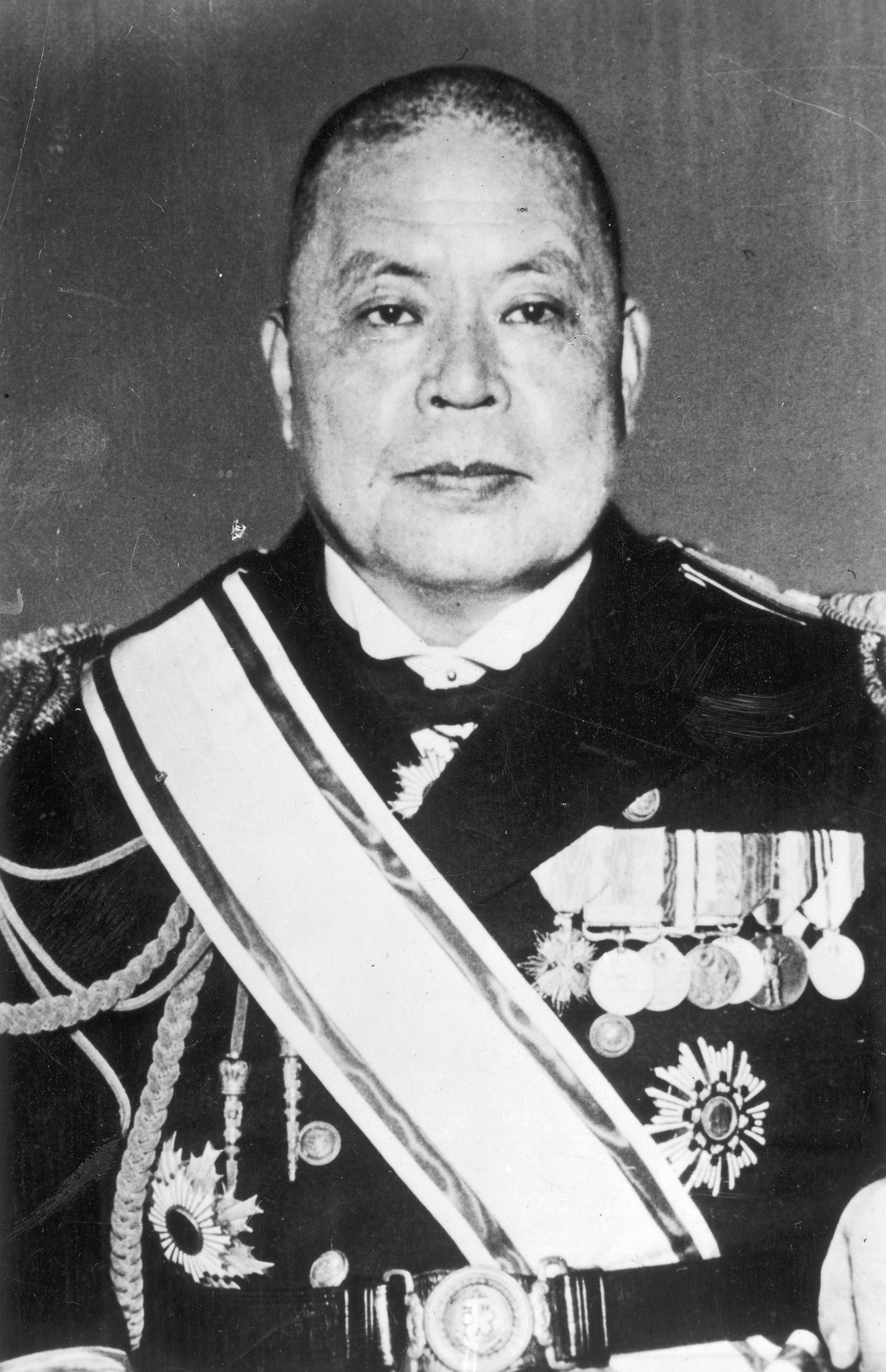

Minister of the Navy
- In office 9 January 1933 – 9 March 1936
- Prime Minister: Saitō Makoto; Keisuke Okada
- Preceded by: Keisuke Okada
- Succeeded by: Osami Nagano
- In office 13 December 1931 – 26 May 1932
- Prime Minister: Inukai Tsuyoshi
- Preceded by: Abo Kiyokazu
- Succeeded by: Keisuke Okada

Member of the Supreme War Council
- In office 9 March 1936 – 5 February 1941
- Monarch: Hirohito
- In office 26 May 1932 – 9 January 1933
- Monarch: Hirohito

Personal details
- Born: 1 May 1876 Inazawa, Aichi, Japan
- Died: 5 February 1941 (aged 64) Guangzhou, Japanese-occupied China
- Resting place: Aoyama Cemetery

Military service
- Allegiance: Empire of Japan
- Branch/service: Imperial Japanese Navy
- Years of service: 1897–1941
- Rank: Admiral
- Commands: Asahi, Naval Affairs Bureau, 2nd Fleet, Yokosuka Naval District
- Battles/wars: Russo-Japanese War; Battle of Port Arthur; Second Sino-Japanese War

Baron Mineo Ōsumi (大角 岑生, Ōsumi Mineo; 1 May 1876 – 5 February 1941) was an admiral in the Imperial Japanese Navy and served twice as Minister of the Navy of Japan during the volatile 1930s.

== Early life ==
Ōsumi was born in what is now the city of Inazawa, Aichi. He was a graduate of the 24th class of the Imperial Japanese Naval Academy, where he placed 3rd out of 18 cadets. He served as midshipman on the corvette Hiei, cruiser Itsukushima and battleship Yashima. After being commissioned as ensign, he was assigned to the cruiser Chiyoda and then the cruiser Azuma on its voyage to France in 1899.

== Naval career ==
After his return, Ōsumi was promoted to lieutenant, and served as chief navigator on the cruisers Saien and Matsushima, and the patrol ship Manshu during the Russo-Japanese War. While on Matsushima, he participated in the Battle of Port Arthur and other combat engagements. He was awarded the Order of the Golden Kite, 5th class on 1 April 1906.

After the end of the war, Ōsumi returned to the Naval War College, emerging as a lieutenant commander on 29 September 1906. After serving in a number of staff positions, Ōsumi was assigned as naval attaché to Germany from 27 January 1909 to 1 December 1911.

On his return to Japan, Ōsumi was promoted to commander, and was assigned as aide-de-camp to Fleet Admiral Tōgō Heihachirō. He spent a year as executive officer on the battlecruiser Tsukuba from 1913 to 1914, returning to staff positions until 1 December 1917, when he received his first command: the battleship Asahi.

From 1 December 1918 – 1 July 1921, Ōsumi was appointed as military attaché to France. During that time, he was a participant in the Japanese delegation to the Versailles Peace Treaty negotiations. Also during this period, on 1 December 1920, he was promoted to rear admiral.

After his return to Japan, Ōsumi served as Director of the Bureau of Naval Affairs in 1922, and was promoted to vice admiral in 1924, Vice Minister of the Navy in 1925, commander-in-chief of the IJN 2nd Fleet in 1928, and Commander in Chief of the Yokosuka Naval District in 1929. He was promoted to full admiral on 1 April 1930. Ōsumi was a strong proponent of Japan's southward expansion, but refused to align himself with either the Treaty Faction or the Fleet Faction within the Navy. He was awarded the Order of the Sacred Treasures, 1st class on 14 May 1931.

== Political career ==
Ōsumi served as Minister of the Navy from December 1931-May 1932, under the short-lived cabinet of Prime Minister Inukai Tsuyoshi.

His second term as Minister of the Navy was from January 1933-March 1936, during the cabinets of Prime Minister Saitō Makoto and Keisuke Okada. Ōsumi, despite his reputation as a liberal, supported the decision to withdraw from the League of Nations and also argued forcefully for higher naval appropriations budget and re-negotiation of the Washington Naval Treaty. In a "guns and butter" debate, Ōsumi told Japanese legislators that it was incumbent to expand Japan's navy, and that "the whole Japanese nation must make up its mind to cope with the situation, even if we are reduced to eating rice gruel.".

On 7 February 1934, he was awarded the Order of the Rising Sun, 1st class. On 26 December 1935, he was ennobled with the title of baron (danshaku) under the kazoku peerage system.

During the attempted coup by a faction of the Imperial Japanese Army in February 1936 (the February 26 incident, Ōsumi's actions were remarkably ambiguous. Although the commander of the Combined Fleet, Admiral Sankichi Takahashi ordered his battleships in Tokyo Bay and targeted the rebel positions, and the commander of the Yokosuka Naval District, Admiral Shigeyoshi Inoue organized a land force to march on Tokyo, Ōsumi refused to issue any orders or take any action, despite word that Prime Minister Okada Keisuke had survived the attack. After the suppression of the coup, Ōsumi resigned as Minister of the Navy, and served as Naval Councilor from 1936 onwards. In 1940, on the retirement of Prince Fushimi Hiroyasu, Ōsumi became the most senior admiral in the Imperial Japanese Navy; however, he was bypassed for promotion by Osami Nagano.

Ōsumi was killed in action in the Second Sino-Japanese War during an inspection tour of the front lines on 5 February 1941, when his plane, an Imperial Japanese Airways transport, was shot down by Chinese guerrillas soon after takeoff from Guangzhou on a flight towards Japanese-occupied Hainan. He was posthumously awarded the Order of the Rising Sun: Grand Cordon of the Paulownia Flowers. His grave is at the Aoyama Cemetery in Tokyo.

Political offices
Preceded by Abo Kiyokazu	Vice-Minister of the Navy; 15 April 1925 - 10 December 1928	Succeeded by Yamanashi Katsunoshin
Military offices
Preceded by Koshiro Otani	2nd Fleet; Commander-in-chief; 10 December 1928 – 11 November 1929	Succeeded by Nobutaro Iida
Preceded by Yamamoto Eisuke	Yokosuka Naval District; Commander-in-chief; 11 November 1929 - 1 December 1931	Succeeded by Nomura Kichisaburō
Political offices
Preceded by Abo Kiyokazu	Minister of the Navy; 13 December 1931 – 26 May 1932	Succeeded by Okada Keisuke
Preceded by Okada Keisuke	Minister of the Navy; 9 January 1933 – 9 March 1936	Succeeded by Nagano Osami
