= Japanese military modernization of 1868–1931 =

Process of Westernizing the Japanese military during the Meiji era (1868–1912)

In Japanese military history, the modernization of the Japanese army and navy during the Meiji period (1868–1912) and until the Mukden Incident (1931) was carried out by the newly founded national government, a military leadership that was only responsible to the Emperor, and with the help of France, Britain, and later Germany.

== Meiji reforms ==
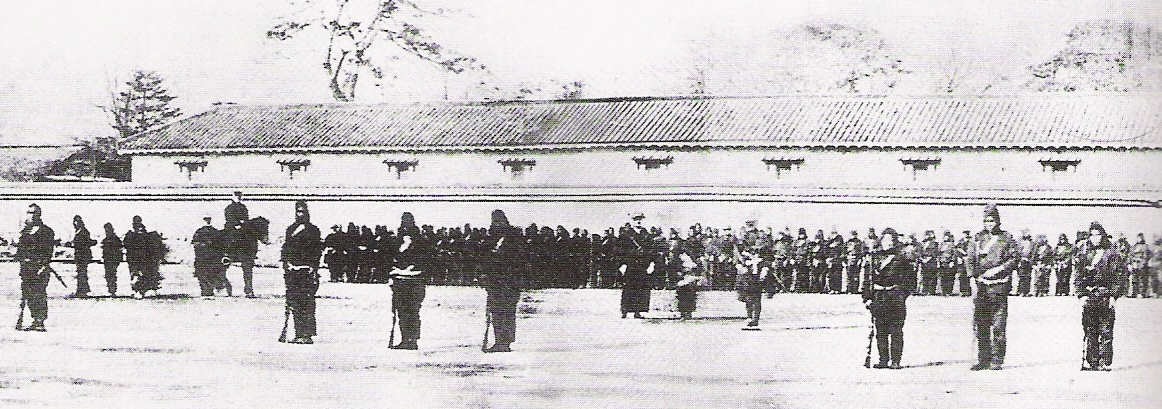
An 1868 photograph of Japanese Tokugawa Bakufu troops being trained by the French Military Mission to Japan

When Western powers began to use their superior military strength to press Japan for trade relations in the 1850s, the country's decentralized and antiquated military forces were unable to provide an effective defense against their advances.

The fall of the Tokugawa shogunate in 1867 led to the restoration of the Meiji Emperor and a remarkable period of national growth. De facto political and administrative power shifted to a group of younger samurai who had been instrumental in forming the new system and were committed to modernizing the military. They introduced drastic changes, which cleared the way for the development of modern, European-style armed forces.

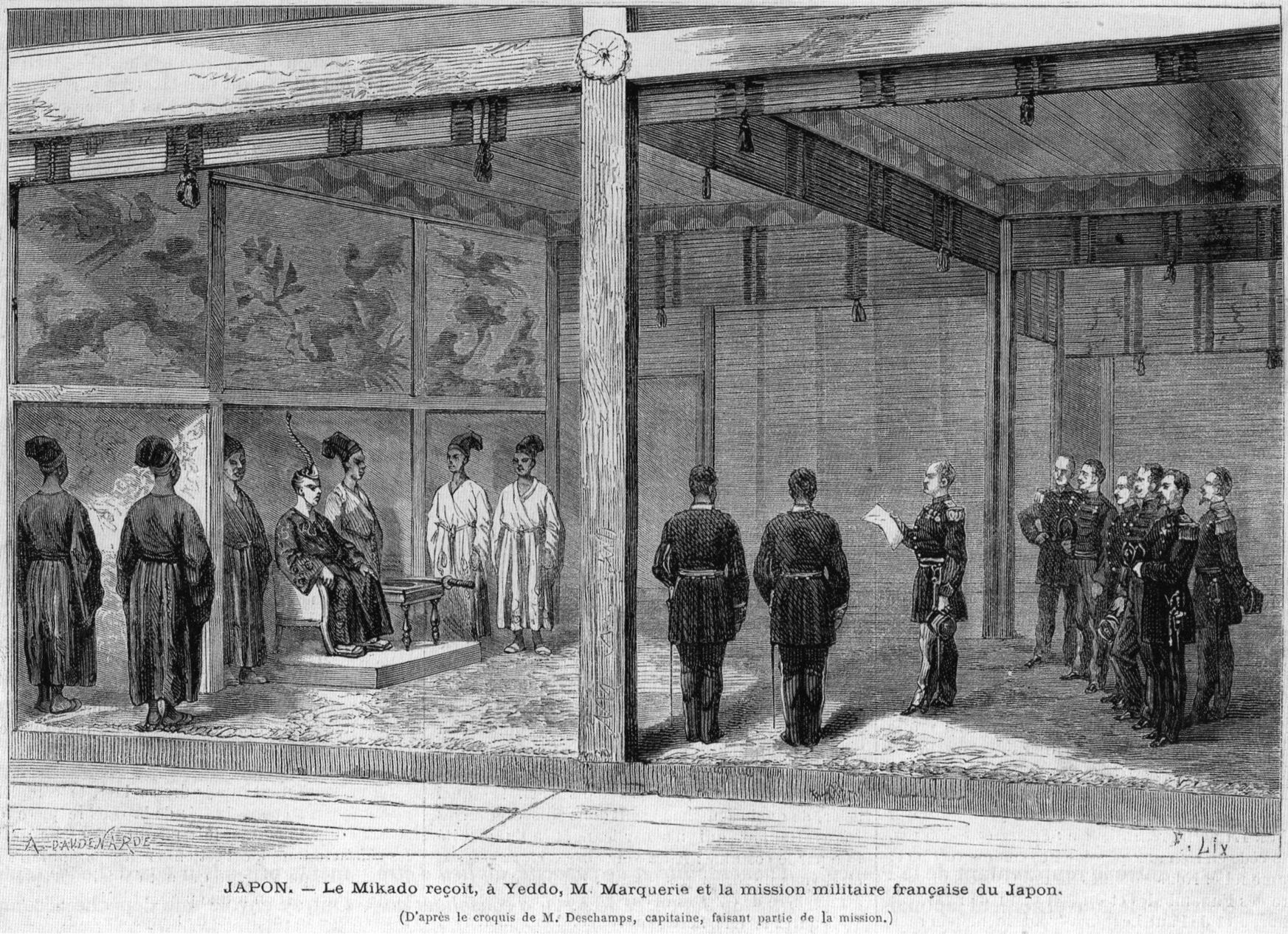
Reception by the Meiji Emperor of the second French Military Mission to Japan, 1872

In an attempt to increase the number of soldiers the use of conscription became universal and obligatory in 1872 and, although samurai wedded to their traditional prerogatives resisted, by 1880 a conscript army was firmly established. The Imperial Army General Staff Office, created after the Prussian model of the Generalstab, was established directly under the emperor in 1878 and was given broad powers for military planning and strategy. The new force eventually made the samurai spirit its own. Loyalties formerly accorded to feudal lords were transferred to the state and the emperor. Upon release from service, soldiers carried these ideals back to their home communities, extending military-derived standards to all classes.

Japan was dedicated to creating a unified, modern nation by the late nineteenth–century. Among their goals were to instill respect for the emperor, the requiring of universal education throughout the Japanese nation, and lastly the privilege and importance of military service. The Conscription Law established on January 10, 1873, made military service mandatory for all men in their twenties to enlist. "In 1873, no one could predict with certainty whether these quarrels would end peacefully or through military action, nor was it clear which individuals or groups would come out on top in the expected power struggle." This legislation was the most significant military reform of the Meiji era. The samurai class no longer held a monopoly on military power; their benefits and status were stripped from them after the Meiji Restoration. The dissolution of the samurai class would create a modern army of men of equal status. However, many of the samurai were unhappy with reforms and openly shared their concerns.

The conscription law was a way of social control: placing the unruly samurai class back into their roles as warriors. The Japanese government intended that conscription would build a modern army capable of standing against the armies of Europe. However, the Meiji Restoration initially caused dissent among the dissolved samurai class, but the conscription system was a way of stabilizing that dissent. Some of the samurai, more disgruntled than the others, formed pockets of resistance to circumvent the mandatory military service. Many committed self-mutilation or openly rebelled (Satsuma Rebellion). They expressed their displeasure, because rejecting Western culture "became a way of demonstrating one's commitment" to the ways of the earlier Tokugawa era.

The law also allowed the military to educate the enlisted. With the swing towards urbanization, the government was concerned about the population’s education lagging behind: Most commoners were illiterate and unknowing. The military provided "fresh opportunities for education" and career advancement. The "raw recruits would, especially in the first years of conscription, learn how to read". The government realized that an educated soldier could become a productive member of society; education was for the betterment of the state.

For men to serve in the army, they were required to submit to a medical examination. This conscription exam measured height, weight and included an inspection of the candidate's genitals. Those unable to pass the exam, the "congenitally weak, inveterately diseased, or deformed", were sent back to their families. The exam "divided the citizenry into those who were fit for duty and those who were not". There was no material penalty for failing the exam, but those who were unable to serve could be marginalized by society.

An imperial rescript of 1882 called for unquestioning loyalty to the emperor by the new armed forces and asserted that commands from superior officers were equivalent to commands from the emperor. Thenceforth, the military existed in an intimate and privileged relationship with the imperial institution. Top-ranking military leaders were given direct access to the emperor and the authority to transmit his pronouncements directly to the troops. The sympathetic relationship between conscripts and officers, particularly junior officers who were drawn mostly from the peasantry, tended to draw the military closer to the people. In time, most people came to look more for guidance in national matters to military commanders than to political leaders.

The main concern of Japanese military modernization in the early 1900s focused on adopting the weaponry of the Western world. To do so Japan had to create a system where they could manufacture the technology themselves. This would cause the industrialization of Japan, called for by the leaders of the island country. Another strategy that Japan used to advance their position in the world would be to ally with European nations. Japan saw itself vulnerable to European powers, thus the country decided to ally with Great Britain in 1902. The alliance, named the Anglo-Japanese alliance, called for both nations to come to each others aid if a war with more than two additional nations broke out.

== Wars and other conflicts ==
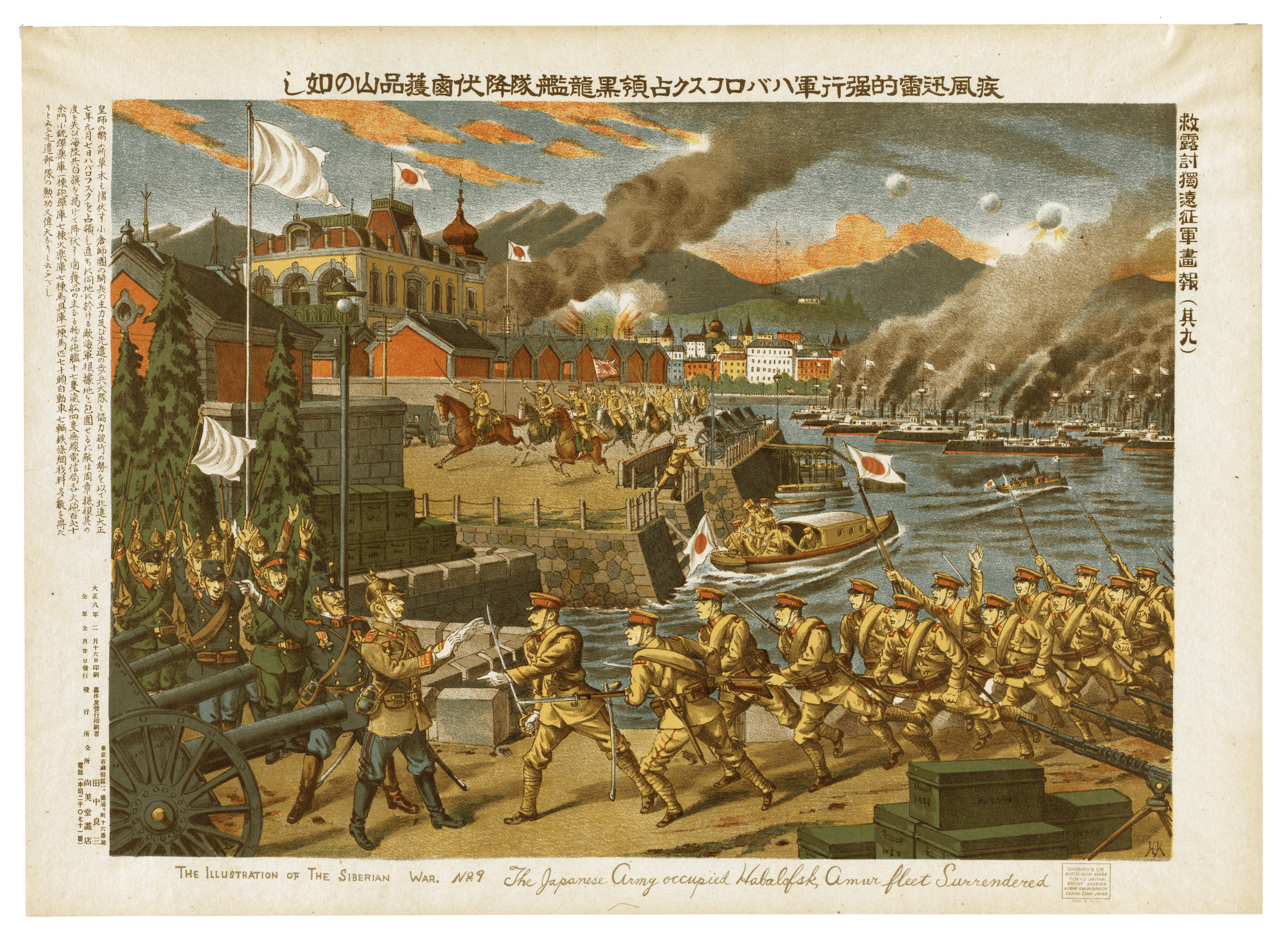
An illustration of Khabarovsk occupied by Japanese troops during the Russian Civil War

The first overseas test of the nation's new military capabilities was the Taiwan Expedition of 1874, which was in retaliation for the 1871 murder of shipwrecked Ryūkyūan sailors. It was followed by a series of victorious military ventures until World War II. Japan moved against Korea and China (First Sino-Japanese War), and Russia (Russo-Japanese War) to secure the raw materials and strategic territories it believed necessary for the development and protection of the homeland. Territorial gains were achieved in Korea, the southern half of Sakhalin ("Karafuto" in Japanese), and Manchuria. As an ally of Britain in World War I, Japan assumed control over Germany's possessions in Asia in the Treaty of Versailles, notably in China's Shandong Province, and the German-controlled Mariana, Caroline, and Marshall Islands in the Pacific Ocean.

During the Boxer Rebellion (1899-1901) in China, the Japanese contingent was the largest among the Eight-Nation Alliance. The Russian Civil War led to Japanese intervention in Siberia to prop up the White Guard.

The Naval General Staff, independent from the supreme command from 1893, became even more powerful after World War I. At the 1921–22 Washington Naval Conference, the major powers signed the Five Power Naval Disarmament Treaty, which set the international capital ship ratio for the United States, Britain, Japan, France, and Italy at 5, 5, 3, 1.75, and 1.75, respectively. The Imperial Navy insisted that it required a ratio of seven ships for every eight United States naval ships but settled for three to five, a ratio acceptable to the Japanese public.

The London Naval Treaty of 1930 brought about further reductions but, by the end of 1935, Japan had entered a period of unlimited military expansion and ignored its previous commitments. By the late 1930s, the proportion of Japanese to United States naval forces was 70.6 percent in total tonnage and 94 percent in aircraft carriers, and Japanese ships slightly outnumbered those of the United States.
