= Geneva Naval Conference =

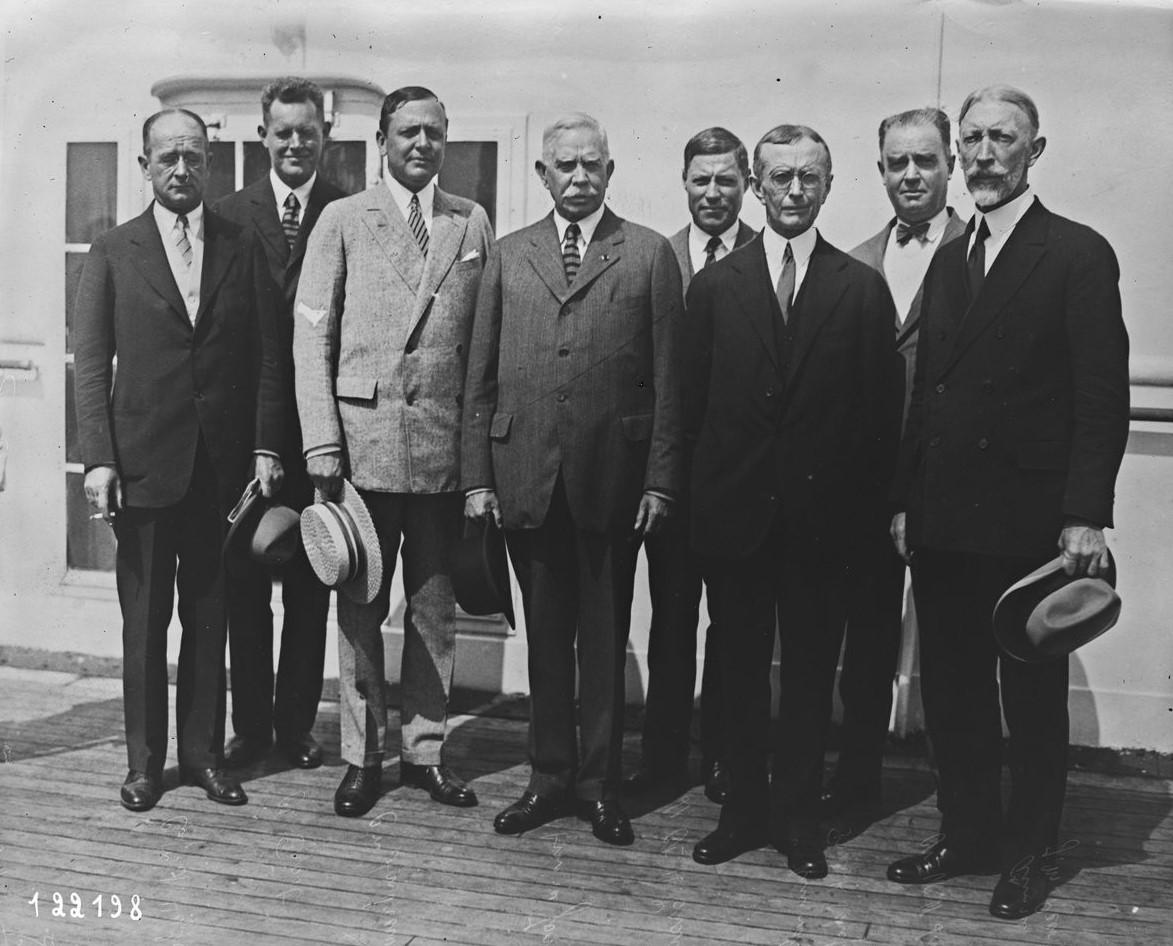
U.S. Navy officers at the conference (from left to right: Arthur J. Hepburn, Laurence H. Frost, Adolphus Andrews, Hilary P. Jones, Harold C. Train, Frank H. Schofield, William W. Smith and Joseph M. Reeves)

The Geneva Naval Conference was a conference held to discuss naval arms limitation, held in Geneva, Switzerland, from 20 June to 4 August in 1927. The aim of the conference was to extend the existing limits on naval construction which had been agreed in the Washington Naval Treaty. The Washington Treaty had limited the construction of battleships and aircraft carriers, but had not limited the construction of cruisers, destroyers or submarines.

== Background ==
In February 1927, President Calvin Coolidge issued a call to the Big Five Powers to meet in Geneva to confront the issue of naval rivalries, as a result of discussions about naval arms limitations at League of Nations disarmament meetings. Britain and Japan accepted the invitation, but France and Italy (the other nations which had signed the Washington Treaty) declined.

The Washington Treaty had defined a ratio of 5:5:3:1.75:1.75 in the strength of capital ships (battleships and battlecruisers) between Britain, the United States, Japan, France, and Italy respectively. The USA sought to use the Geneva conference to extend this ratio to smaller craft, allowing both Britain and themselves cruisers with a total displacement of 300,000 tons, with the Japanese allowed 180,000 tons. At the same time, the USA wanted to avoid further restrictions on the sizes of individual ships.

== Negotiations ==
Under the Washington Treaty, each nation was allowed to build cruisers of up to 10,000 tons displacement carrying 8-inch guns. In practice this had also become a minimum figure, with navies competing to design cruisers of exactly 10,000 tons displacement. The US's negotiating position, on which it was unwilling to compromise, was a plan to build 25 heavy cruisers of 10,000 tons displacement (250,000 tons total).

Britain, by contrast, was prepared to accept parity with the US in its cruiser fleet, so long as the Royal Navy was able to maintain the very large cruiser force, if necessary of smaller and cheaper ships, which it felt was necessary to protect the long trade routes and imperial commitments of the British Empire. Britain proposed the reduction of the 10,000-ton and 8-inch limit for newly constructed cruisers. The British estimated they needed 70 cruisers totalling 560,000 tons displacement (i.e. averaging 8,000 tons each), almost twice the total tonnage of the American proposal. The leader of their delegation, First Lord of the Admiralty William Bridgeman refused to consider parity if it meant reducing the British fleet.

The principal Japanese concern was to avoid a repetition of the 5:5:3 ratio. The Japanese naval staff felt that a fleet 70% the size of that of the US was the minimum required to win a war against the US. Since the 70% ratio had not been achieved with battleships, it was particularly important to retain it for cruisers. However, since the British and American delegations were unable to reach agreement, Japanese objections were not crucial to the failure of the summit.

In the end, the participants at the conference failed to reach a binding agreement regarding the distribution of naval tonnage.

== Impact ==
Britain's stance as pursued by Bridgeman, who remained First Lord of the Admiralty until 1929, having caused the failure of the conference, led to a temporary deterioration in the peacetime Anglo-American relations.

The question of limitations on cruiser tonnage was raised again at the London Naval Conference of 1930, resulting in the London Naval Treaty. The London Conference succeeded where Geneva failed, with the US being permitted a larger number of heavy cruisers than Britain, but Britain being permitted a larger number of light cruisers. Agreement was reached in part because the British and US delegations recognized a greater shared interest and the need to cut government expenditure as a result of the Wall Street Crash of 1929. These events focused minds on the need to reach an agreement.
