= Treaty Faction =

Informal political faction of the Imperial Japanese Navy in the 1920s and 1930s era

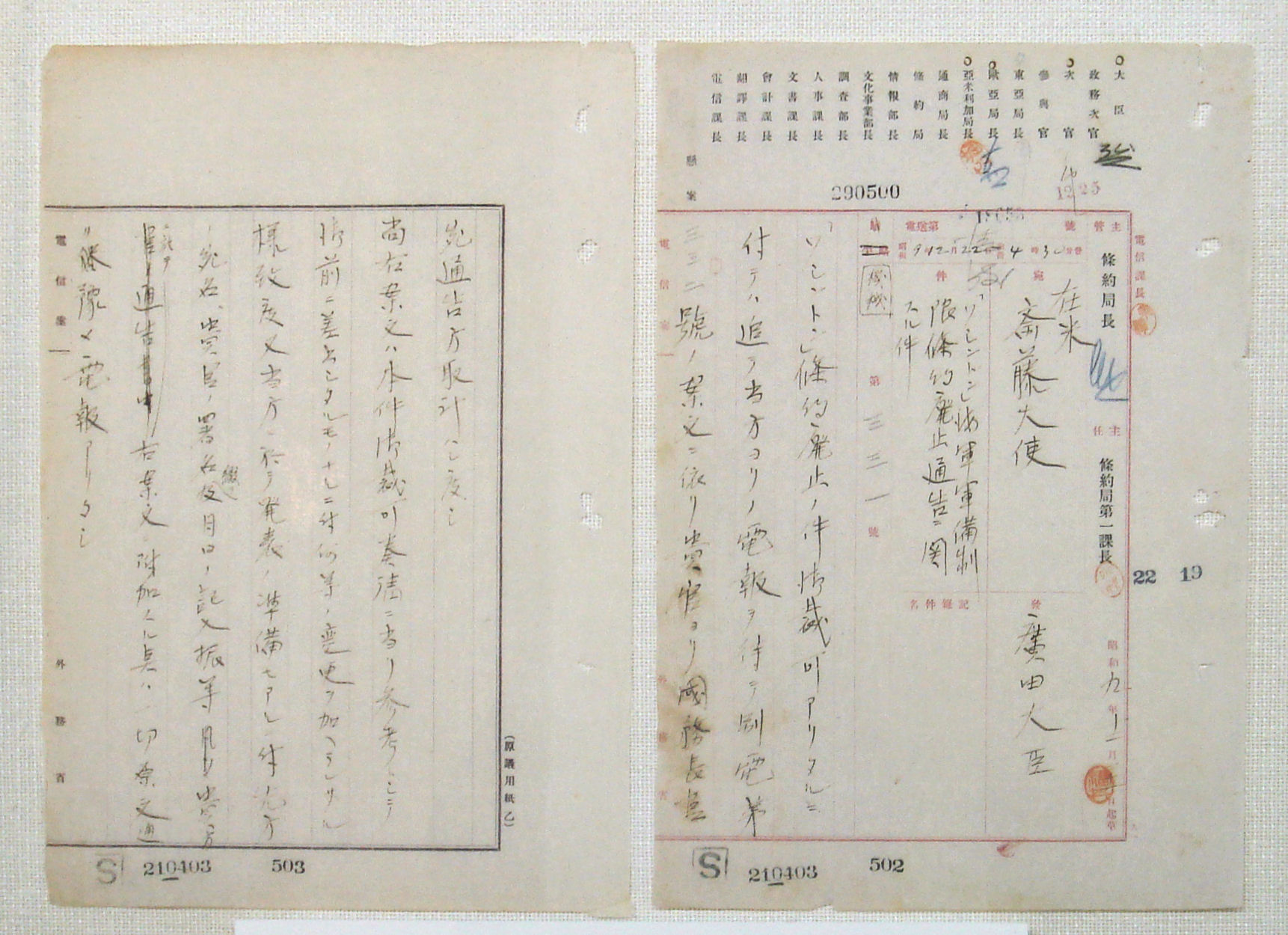
Japanese denunciation of the Washington Naval Treaty, 29 December 1934.

The Treaty Faction (条約派, Jōyaku-ha) was an unofficial and informal political faction within the Imperial Japanese Navy in the 1920s–1930s of officers supporting the Washington Naval Treaty.

== Background ==
The Washington Naval Treaty, also known as the Five-Power Treaty, limited the naval armaments of its five signatories: the United States, the United Kingdom, Japan, France, and Italy. The treaty was agreed at the Washington Naval Conference, which was held in Washington, D.C. from November 1921 to February 1922.

The treaty limited the total capital ship tonnage of each of the signatories; no single ship could exceed 35,000 tons, and no ship could carry a gun in excess of 16 inches. Only two large aircraft carriers were permitted per nation. No new fortifications or naval bases could be established, and existing bases and defenses could not be improved in the external territories and possessions specified in the treaty. The tonnage allotment to Japan was based on a 5:5:3 ratio compared with the United States and United Kingdom, with the justification being that the latter countries needed to maintain fleets on more than one ocean, whereas Japan had only the Pacific Ocean.

== Development ==
The terms of the treaty were extremely unpopular with the Japanese public, many of whom saw the 5:5:3 ratio as another way of being regarded as an inferior race by the West.

The Imperial Japanese Navy was also split into two opposing factions, the Fleet Faction and the Treaty Faction. The latter argued that Japan could not afford an arms race with the Western powers and hoped through diplomacy to restore the Anglo-Japanese Alliance. It argued that the current treaty limitations would serve Japan for the time being.

The Treaty Faction was composed of the political left wing within the Navy, including influential admirals in the Navy Ministry such as Takarabe Takeshi, Taniguchi Naomi, Yamanashi Katsunoshin, Sakonji Seizo, and Teikichi Hori.

In the 1920s, the Treaty Faction, which was supported by the civilian government, was predominant. However, the even more restrictive London Naval Treaty of 1930 divided the Treaty Faction into two parts. The "Anti-London Treaty Faction" pushed for military and economic expansion into the South Pacific, and thus became more closely aligned with the "Fleet Faction".

With increasing Japanese militarism in the 1930s, the growing conflict with the United States over China, and the blatant disregard for the terms of the treaty by all major powers, the Fleet Faction gradually gained the upper hand. Furthermore, many of the Treaty Faction members who had direct first-hand experience in Britain or the United States went into retirement from 1933 to 1934, including Isoroku Yamamoto's mentor, Teikichi Hori.

On 29 December 1934, the Japanese government gave formal notice that it intended to terminate the treaty. Its provisions remained in force until the end of 1936, after which it was not renewed.

== Naval Left Faction ==
The Treaty Faction is also referred to as the Naval Left Faction (海軍左派, Kaigun-saha), where "left" is a contrast to the "right" Fleet Faction, which opposed the conclusion of the Washington Naval Treatment. Representative Naval Left Factions include Isoroku Yamamoto, Mitsumasa Yonai, and Shigeyoshi Inoue, who were called "Ministry of the Navy's Left Faction Trio" (海軍省の左派トリオ) or "Treaty Faction Three Musketeers" (条約派三羽烏).

== See also ==
- Fleet Faction

== Bibliography ==
- Goldman, Emily O. Sunken Treaties: Naval Arms Control between the Wars. Pennsylvania State U. Press, 1994. 352 pp.
- Erik Goldstein. The Washington Conference, 1921–22: Naval Rivalry, East Asian Stability and the Road to Pearl Harbor (1994)
- Kaufman, Robert Gordon. Arms Control during the Prenuclear Era: The United States and Naval Limitation between the Two World Wars. Columbia U. Press, 1990. 289 pp.
- Kitching, Carolyn J. (1999). Britain and the Problem of International Disarmament, 1919–1934. Routledge. Archived from the original on 2007-12-25 – via Questia.
