= Washington Naval Treaty =

1922 pact by the Allies of WWI

Limitation of Naval Armament
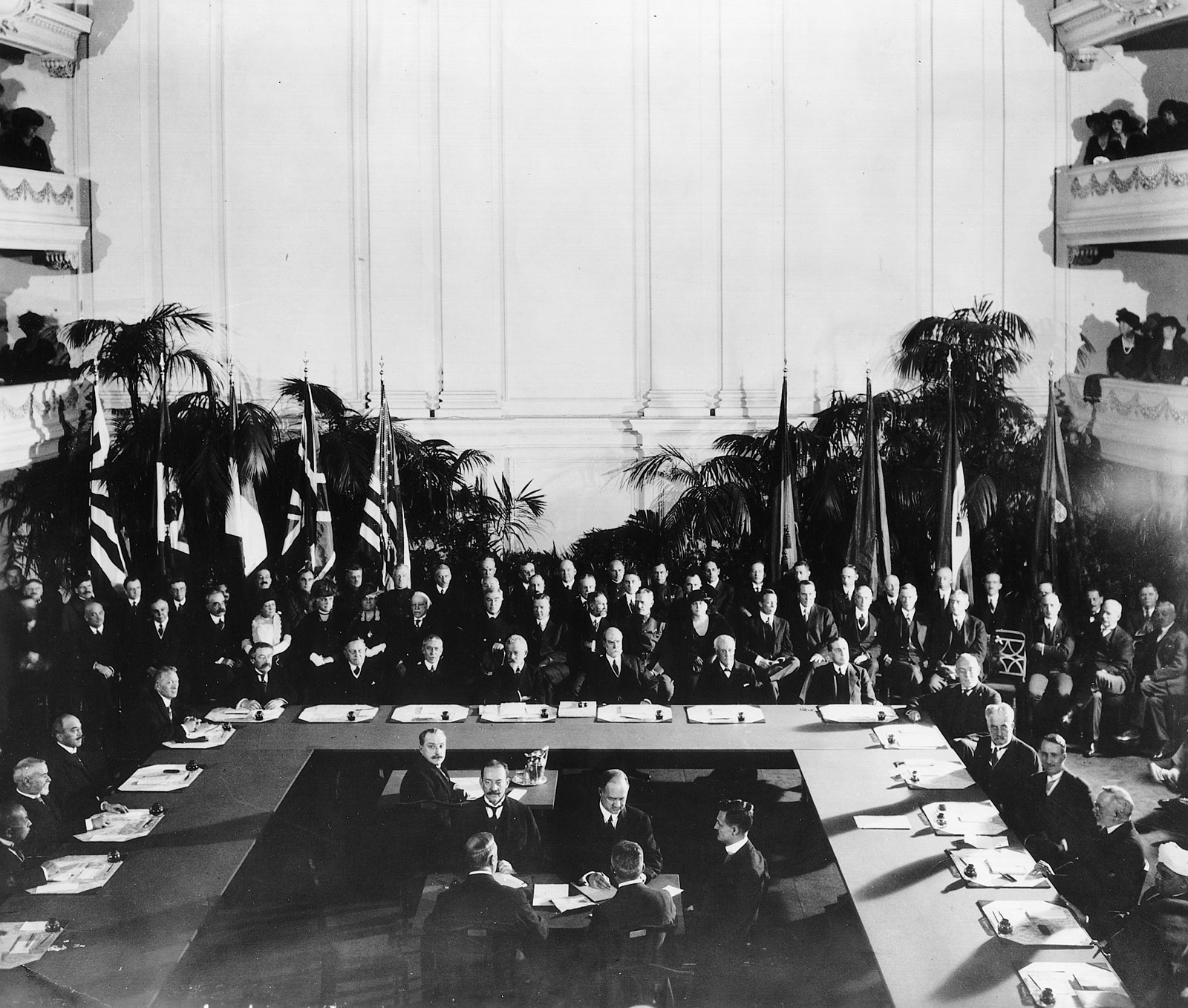
- Signing of the Washington Naval Treaty (1922)
- Type: Arms control
- Context: World War I
- Signed: February 6, 1922
- Location: Memorial Continental Hall, Washington, D.C.
- Effective: August 17, 1923
- Expiration: December 31, 1936
- Negotiators: (United States) Charles Evans Hughes; (United Kingdom) Arthur Balfour; (French Third Republic) Albert Sarraut; (Kingdom of Italy) Carlo Schanzer; (Empire of Japan) Katō Tomosaburō
- Signatories: (United States) Warren G. Harding; (British Empire) George V; (French Third Republic) Alexandre Millerand; (Kingdom of Italy) Victor Emmanuel III; (Empire of Japan) Yoshihito
- Parties: United States; British Empire; United Kingdom; Canada; Australia; South Africa; New Zealand; India; French Third Republic; Kingdom of Italy; Empire of Japan
- Depositary: League of Nations
- Citations: 25 L.N.T.S. 202
- Languages: French; English

The Washington Naval Treaty, also known as the Five-Power Treaty, was signed during 1922 among the major Allies of World War I, who agreed to prevent an arms race by limiting naval construction. It was negotiated at the Washington Naval Conference in Washington, D.C., from November 1921 to February 1922 and signed by the governments of the British Empire (including the United Kingdom, Canada, Australia, New Zealand, South Africa and India), United States, France, Italy, and the Japan. It limited the construction of battleships, battlecruisers and aircraft carriers by the signatories. The number of other categories of warships, including cruisers, destroyers, and submarines, were not limited by the treaty, but those ships were limited to 10,000 tons displacement each.

The treaty was finalized on February 6, 1922. Ratifications of it were exchanged in Washington on August 17, 1923, and it was registered in the League of Nations Treaty Series on April 16, 1924.

Later conferences on naval arms limitation sought additional limitations of warship building. The terms of the Washington Naval Treaty were modified by the London Naval Treaty of 1930 and the Second London Naval Treaty of 1936. By the mid-1930s, Japan and Italy had renounced the treaties, while Germany renounced the Treaty of Versailles which had limited its navy. Naval arms limitation became increasingly difficult for the other signatories.

== Background ==
Immediately after World War I, Britain still had the world's largest and most powerful navy, followed by the United States and, more distantly, by Japan, France and Italy. The British Royal Navy interned the defeated German High Seas Fleet in November 1918. The Allies had differing opinions concerning the final disposition of the Imperial German Navy, with the French and Italians wanting the German fleet divided between the victorious powers and the Americans and British wanting the ships destroyed. The negotiations became moot after German crews scuttled most of their ships on June 21, 1919.

News of the scuttling angered the French and the Italians, with the French particularly unimpressed with British explanations that the fleet guarding the Germans had then been away on exercises. Nevertheless, the British joined their allies in condemning the German actions, and no credible evidence emerged to suggest that the British had collaborated with the Germans with respect to the scuttling. The Treaty of Versailles, signed a week later on June 28, 1919, imposed strict limits on the sizes and numbers of warships which the newly-installed German government had the right to build and maintain.

The Americans, British, French, Italians, and Japanese had been allies during World War I, but with the German threat seemingly over, a naval arms race between the allies seemed likely. US President Woodrow Wilson's administration had already announced successive plans for the expansion of the US Navy from 1916 to 1919 that would have resulted in a massive fleet of 50 modern battleships.

In response, the Japanese Diet in 1920 finally authorised construction of warships to enable the Imperial Japanese Navy to attain its goal of an "eight-eight" fleet programme, with eight modern battleships and eight battlecruisers. The Japanese started work on four battleships and four battlecruisers, all of which were much larger and more powerful than those of the classes that they were replacing.

The 1921 British Naval Estimates planned four 'N3' battleships and four 'G3' battlecruisers (Note: The term "battlecruiser" was relative to the N3 battleships; the G3 were larger and more heavily armed and armoured than any battleshp built to that point), with another four battleships to follow the subsequent year.

The new arms race was unwelcome to the American public. The US Congress disapproved of Wilson's 1919 naval expansion plan, and the 1920 presidential election campaign resulted in politicians in Washington resuming the non-interventionism of the prewar era, with little enthusiasm for continued naval expansion. Britain also could ill afford the exorbitant cost of capital ships.

In late 1921, the US became aware that Britain was planning a conference to discuss the strategic situation in the Pacific and Far East regions. To forestall the British plan and to satisfy domestic demands for a global disarmament conference, Warren Harding's administration called the Washington Naval Conference in November 1921.

The Conference agreed to the Five-Power Naval Treaty as well as a Four-Power Treaty on Japan and a Nine-Power Treaty on China.

== Negotiations ==
At the first plenary session held November 21, 1921, US Secretary of State Charles Evans Hughes presented his country's proposals. Hughes provided a dramatic beginning for the conference by stating with resolve: "The way to disarm is to disarm". The ambitious slogan received enthusiastic public endorsement and likely abbreviated the conference while helping ensure his proposals were largely adopted. He subsequently proposed the following:

- A ten-year pause or "holiday" of the construction of capital ships (battleships and battlecruisers), including the immediate suspension of all building of capital ships.
- The scrapping of existing or planned capital ships to give a 5:5:3:1.67:1.67 ratio of tonnage with respect to Britain, the United States, Japan, France and Italy respectively.
- Ongoing limits of both capital ship tonnage and the tonnage of secondary vessels with the 5:5:3 ratio.

=== Capital ships ===
The proposals for capital ships were largely accepted by the British delegation. However, they were controversial with the British public. Britain could no longer have adequate fleets in the North Sea, the Mediterranean and the Far East simultaneously, which provoked outrage from parts of the Royal Navy.

Nevertheless, there was huge demand for the British to agree to the limits and reductions: the risk of war with the Americans was increasingly regarded as merely theoretical as there were very few policy differences between the two Anglophone powers; continued naval spending was unpopular in Britain throughout the empire; and Britain was implementing major budget reductions due to the post–World War I recession.

The Japanese delegation was divided. Japanese naval doctrine required the maintenance of a fleet 70% the size of that of the United States, which was felt to be the minimum necessary to defeat the Americans in any subsequent war. The Japanese envisaged two separate engagements, first with the U.S. Pacific Fleet and then with the U.S. Atlantic Fleet. It calculated that a 7:5 ratio in the first battle would produce enough of a margin of victory to be able to win the subsequent engagement and so a 3:5 ratio was unacceptable because a 3:5 total fleet size ratio would imply a 6:5 ratio in the first battle. Nevertheless, the director of the delegation, Katō Tomosaburō, preferred to accept the latter to the prospect of an arms race with the United States, as the relative industrial strength of the two nations would cause Japan to lose such an arms race and possibly suffer an economic crisis. At the beginning of the negotiations, the Japanese had only 55% of the capital ships and 18% of the GDP of the Americans.

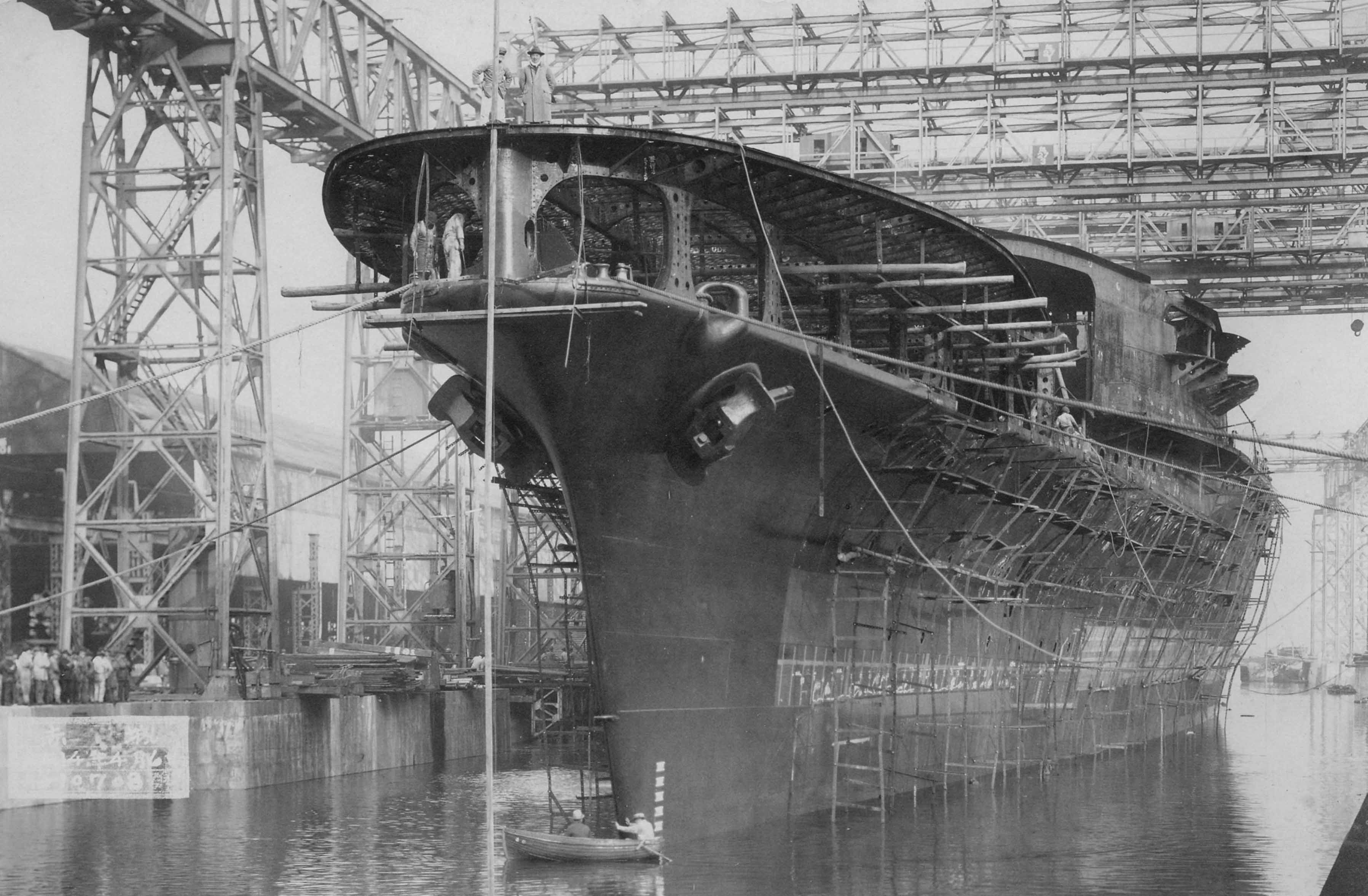
Akagi (Japanese ship originally planned as a battlecruiser but converted during construction to an aircraft carrier) in April 1925

His opinion was opposed strongly by Katō Kanji, the president of the Naval Staff College, who acted as his chief naval aide at the delegation and represented the influential "big navy" opinion that Japan had to prepare as thoroughly as possible for an inevitable conflict against the United States, which could build more warships because of its superior industrial might.

Katō Tomosaburō was finally able to persuade the Japanese high command to accept the Hughes proposals, but the treaty was for years a source of controversy in the navy.

The French delegation initially responded negatively to the idea of reducing their capital ships' tonnage to 175,000 tons and demanded 350,000, slightly above the Japanese limit. In the end, concessions regarding cruisers and submarines helped persuade the French to agree to the limit on capital ships.

Another issue that was considered critical by the French representatives was the Italian request of substantial parity, which was considered to be unsubstantiated; however, pressure from the American and the British delegations caused the French to accept it. That was considered a great success by the Italian government, but parity would never actually be attained.

There was much discussion about the inclusion or exclusion of individual warships. In particular, the Japanese delegation was keen to retain their newest battleship Mutsu, which had been funded with great public enthusiasm, including donations from schoolchildren. That resulted in provisions to allow the Americans and the British to construct equivalent ships.

=== Cruisers and destroyers ===
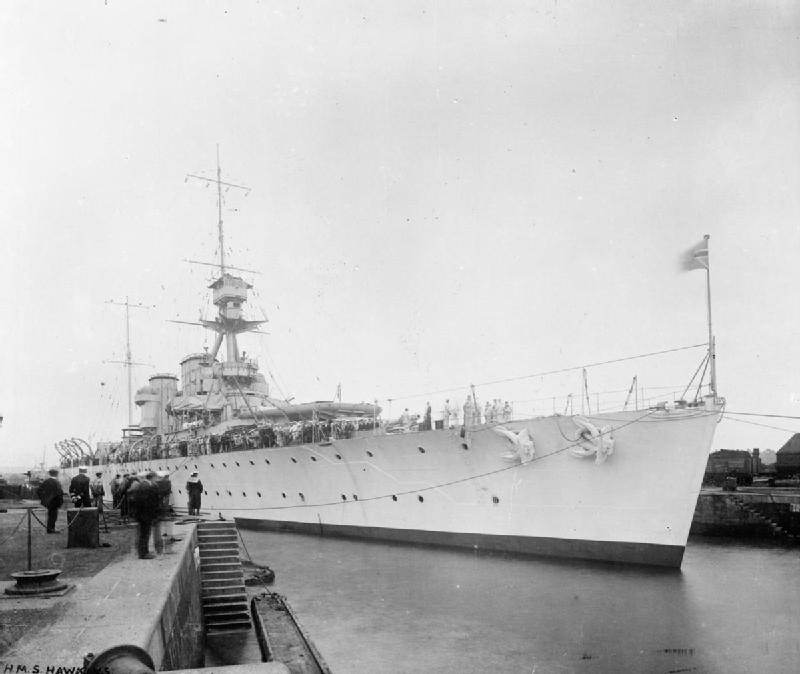
HMS Hawkins, lead ship for her class of heavy cruisers alongside a quay, probably during the interwar period

Hughes proposed to limit secondary ships (cruisers and destroyers) in the same proportions as capital ships. However, that was unacceptable to both the British and the French. The British counterproposal, in which the British would be entitled to 450,000 tons of cruisers in consideration of its imperial commitments but the United States and Japan to only 300,000 and 250,000 respectively, proved equally contentious. Thus, the idea of limiting total cruiser tonnage or numbers was rejected entirely.

Instead, the British suggested a qualitative limit of future cruiser construction. The limit proposed, of a 10,000 ton maximum displacement and 8-inch calibre guns, was intended to allow the British to retain the Hawkins class, then being constructed. That coincided with the American requirements for cruisers for Pacific Ocean operations and also with Japanese plans for the Furutaka class. The suggestion was adopted with little debate.

=== Submarines ===
A major British demand during the negotiations was the complete abolition of the submarine, which had proved so effective against them in the war. That proved impossible, particularly as a result of French opposition, which demanded an allowance of 90,000 tons of submarines, and the conference ended without an agreement to restrict submarines.

=== Pacific bases ===
Article XIX of the treaty also prohibited the British, the Japanese, and the Americans from constructing any new fortifications or naval bases in the Pacific Ocean region. Existing fortifications in Singapore, the Philippines, and Hawaii could remain. That was a significant victory for Japan, as newly-fortified British or American bases would be a serious problem for the Japanese in the event of any future war. That provision of the treaty essentially guaranteed that Japan would be the dominant power in the Western Pacific Ocean and was crucial in gaining Japanese acceptance of the limits on capital ship construction.

== Terms ==
Tonnage limitations
Country	Capital ships	Aircraft carriers
British Empire	525,000 tons (533,000 tonnes)	135,000 tons (137,000 tonnes)
United States	525,000 tons (533,000 tonnes)	135,000 tons (137,000 tonnes)
Empire of Japan	315,000 tons (320,000 tonnes)	81,000 tons (82,000 tonnes)
France	175,000 tons (178,000 tonnes)	60,000 tons (61,000 tonnes)
Italy	175,000 tons (178,000 tonnes)	60,000 tons (61,000 tonnes)

The treaty strictly limited both the tonnage and construction of capital ships and aircraft carriers and included limits of the size of individual ships.

The tonnage limits defined by Articles IV and VII (tabulated) gave a strength ratio of approximately 5:5:3:1.75:1.75 for the UK, the United States, Japan, Italy, and France, respectively.

The qualitative limits of each type of ship were as follows:

- Capital ships (battleships and battlecruisers) were limited to 35,000 tons standard displacement and guns of no larger than 16-inch calibre. (Articles V and VI)
- Aircraft carriers were limited to 27,000 tons and could carry no more than 10 heavy guns, of a maximum calibre of 8 inches. However, each signatory was allowed to use two existing capital ship hulls for aircraft carriers, with a displacement limit of 33,000 tons each (Articles IX and X). For the purposes of the treaty, an aircraft carrier was defined as a warship displacing more than 10,000 tons constructed exclusively for launching and landing aircraft. Carriers lighter than 10,000 tons, therefore, did not count towards the tonnage limits (Article XX, part 4). Moreover, all aircraft carriers then in service or building (Argus, Eagle, Furious, Hermes, Langley and Hōshō) were declared "experimental" and could be replaced without regard to their age, unlike other capital ships (Article VIII).
- All other warships were limited to a maximum displacement of 10,000 tons and a maximum gun calibre of 8 inches (Articles XI and XII).

The treaty also detailed by Chapter II the individual ships to be retained by each navy, including the allowance for the United States to complete two further ships of the Colorado class and for the UK to complete two new ships in accordance with the treaty limits (the Nelson class).

Chapter II, part 2, detailed what was to be done to render a ship ineffective for military use. In addition to sinking or scrapping, a limited number of ships could be converted as target ships or training vessels if their armament, armour and other combat-essential parts were removed completely. Some could also be converted into aircraft carriers.

Part 3, Section II specified the ships to be scrapped to comply with the treaty and when the remaining ships could be replaced. In all, the United States had to scrap 30 existing or planned capital ships, Britain 23 and Japan 17.

== Effects ==
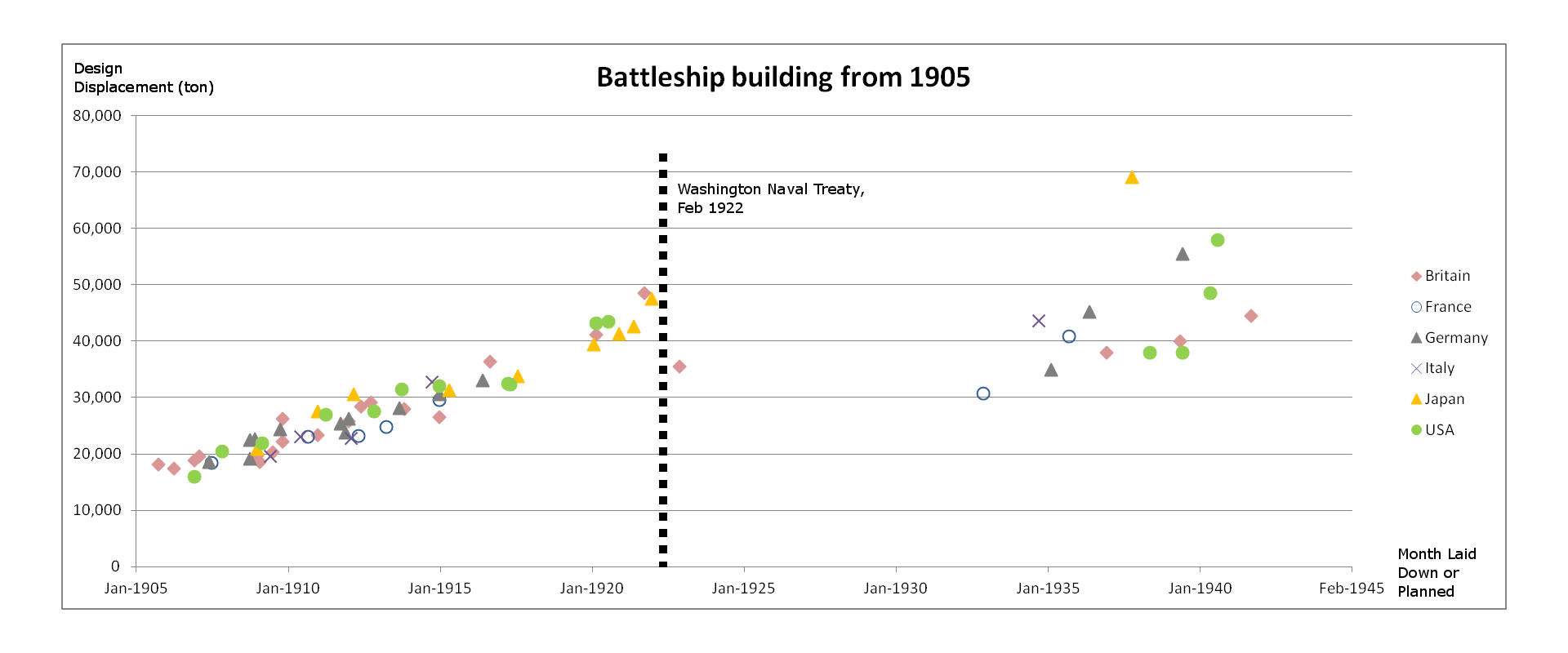
The treaty arrested the continuing upward trend of battleship size and halted new construction entirely for more than a decade.

The treaty marked the end of a long period of increases of battleship construction. Many ships that were being constructed were scrapped or converted into aircraft carriers. Treaty limits were respected and then extended by the London Naval Treaty of 1930. It was not until the mid-1930s that navies began to build battleships once again, and the power and the size of new battleships began to increase once again. The Second London Naval Treaty of 1936 sought to extend the Washington Treaty limits until 1942, but the absence of Japan or Italy made it largely ineffective.

There were fewer effects on cruiser building. The treaty specified 10,000 tons and 8-inch guns as the maximum size of a cruiser, but that was also the minimum size cruiser that any navy was willing to build. The treaty began a building competition of 8-inch, 10,000-ton "treaty cruisers", which gave further cause for concern. Subsequent naval treaties sought to address that by limiting cruiser, destroyer and submarine tonnage.

Unofficial effects of the treaty included the end of the Anglo-Japanese Alliance. Although it was not part of the Washington Treaty in any way, the American delegates had made it clear that they would not agree to the treaty unless the British ended their alliance with the Japanese. The 1921 Imperial Conference earlier in the year had already decided not to renew the Alliance. The regrouping of the Royal Navy in 1921 also meant that it left the South Pacific that year. This weakened the position of Britain's old-time ally Chile and increased the influence of the United States in the Americas. Indirectly, the withdrawal emboldened Peruvian and Bolivian claims against Chile as these two states were often supported diplomatically by the United States.

== Violations ==
In 1935, the French Navy laid down the battleship Richelieu; combined with the two Dunkerque-class battleships also under construction, which placed the total tonnage over the 70,000-ton limit on new French battleships until the expiration of the treaty. The keel laying of Jean Bart in December 1936, albeit less than three weeks before the treaty expired, increased the magnitude of France's violation by another 35,000 tons. The French government dismissed British objections to the violations by pointing out that Britain had signed the Anglo-German Naval Agreement in 1935, which unilaterally dismantled the naval disarmament clauses of the Treaty of Versailles. German naval rearmament threatened France, and according to the French perspective, if Britain freely violated treaty obligations, France would similarly not be constrained.

Italy repeatedly violated the displacement limits on individual ships but attempted to remain within the 10,000-ton limit for the Trento-class cruisers built in the mid-1920s. However, by the Zara-class cruisers in the late 1920s and early 1930s, it had abandoned all pretense and built ships that topped 11,000 long tons (11,000 t) by a wide margin. The violations continued with the Littorio-class battleships of the mid-1930s, which had a standard displacement in excess of 40,000 long tons (41,000 t). The Italian Navy nevertheless misrepresented the displacement of the vessels as being within the limits imposed by the treaty.

=== Loopholes ===
Several powers attempted to exploit loopholes in the treaty, though it is arguable whether these were technically violations of the treaty.

The Japanese light aircraft carrier Ryūjō was an effort to exploit the definition of an aircraft carrier as being "a vessel of war with a displacement in excess of 10,000 tons" by being a carrier of less than 10,000 tons, which would not be restricted by the treaty. However, the ship was not large enough to be fully capable, and was later expanded to be over 10,000 tons total. This loophole was closed by the London Naval Treaty, so no ships besides Ryūjō ever attempted this approach.

The American conversions of USS Lexington and USS Saratoga from battlecruisers to carriers was supposed to be done with a tonnage of no more than 33,000 tons, as conversions. However, the ships were overweight, so the US took advantage of the rules by reconstructing the ships to add an additional 3,000 tons of weight limit to them for anti-air/anti-submarine defenses, arguing that they were being "reconstructed" rather than new builds. No other power attempted to make such an argument.

The British Nelson class took advantage of the fact that the definition of tonnage excluded fuel and reserve boiler feed water. Anti-torpedo defense systems were most effective with liquid layers to absorb the shock of a torpedo strike, however liquids are quite heavy. By building their torpedo defenses such that the water within was usable as reserve boiler feed water, this weight was not counted towards the displacement limit of the ships, thus allowing stronger torpedo defenses than would otherwise have been practical.

== Japanese denunciation ==
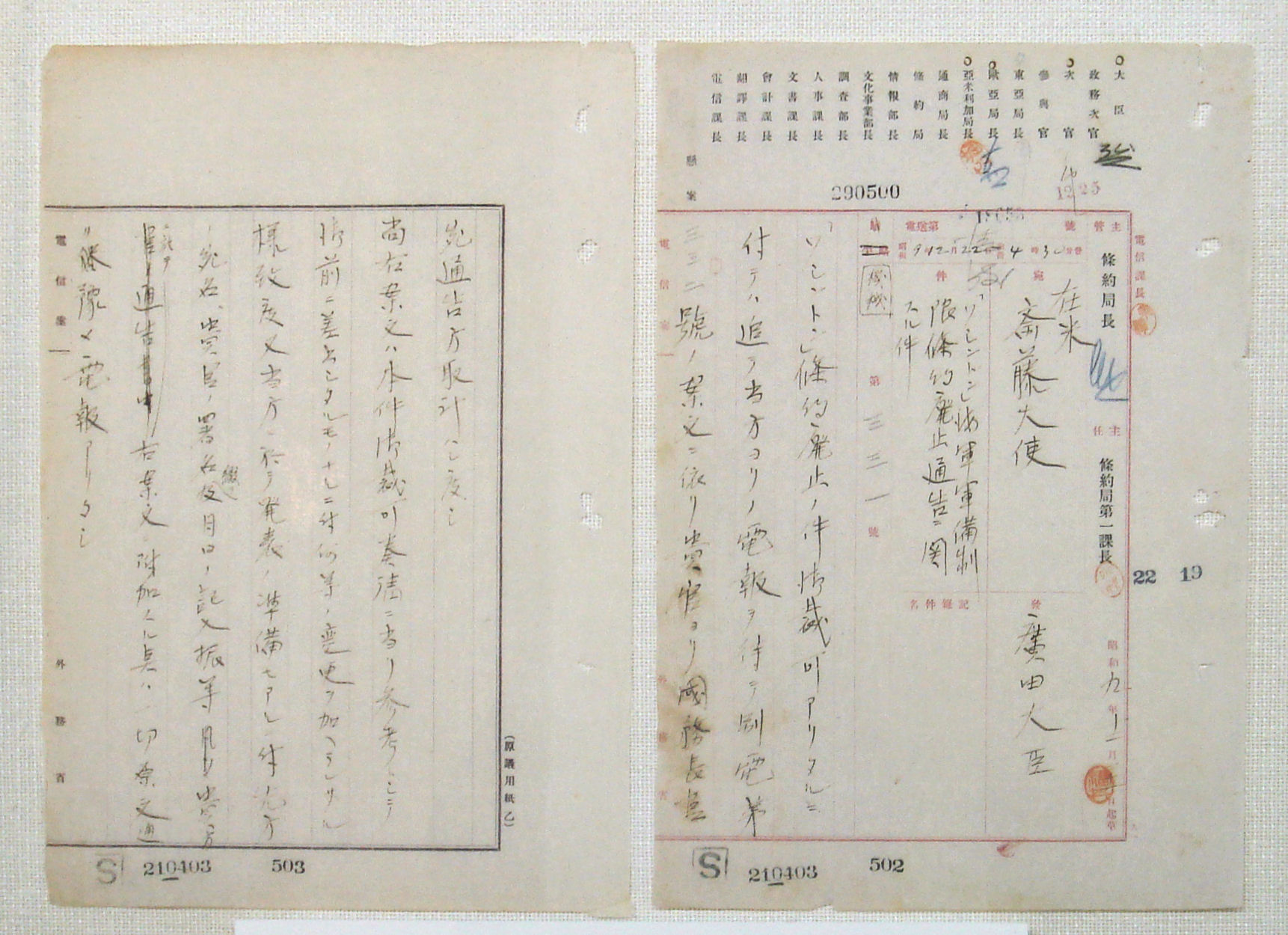
Japanese denunciation of the Washington Naval Treaty, December 29, 1934

The naval treaty had a profound effect on the Japanese. With superior American and British industrial power, a long war would very likely end in a Japanese defeat. Thus, gaining strategic parity was not economically possible.

Many Japanese considered the 5:5:3 ratio of ships as another snub by the West, but it can be argued that the Japanese had a greater force concentration than the US Navy or the Royal Navy. The terms also contributed to controversy in high ranks of the Imperial Japanese Navy between the Treaty Faction officers and their Fleet Faction opponents, who were also allied with the ultranationalists of the Japanese army and other parts of the Japanese government. For the Treaty Faction, the treaty was one of the factors that had contributed to the deterioration of the relationship between the American and the Japanese governments.

Some have also argued that the treaty was one major factor in prompting Japanese expansionism by the Fleet Faction in the early 1930s. The perception of unfairness resulted in Japan's renunciation of the Second London Naval Treaty in 1936.

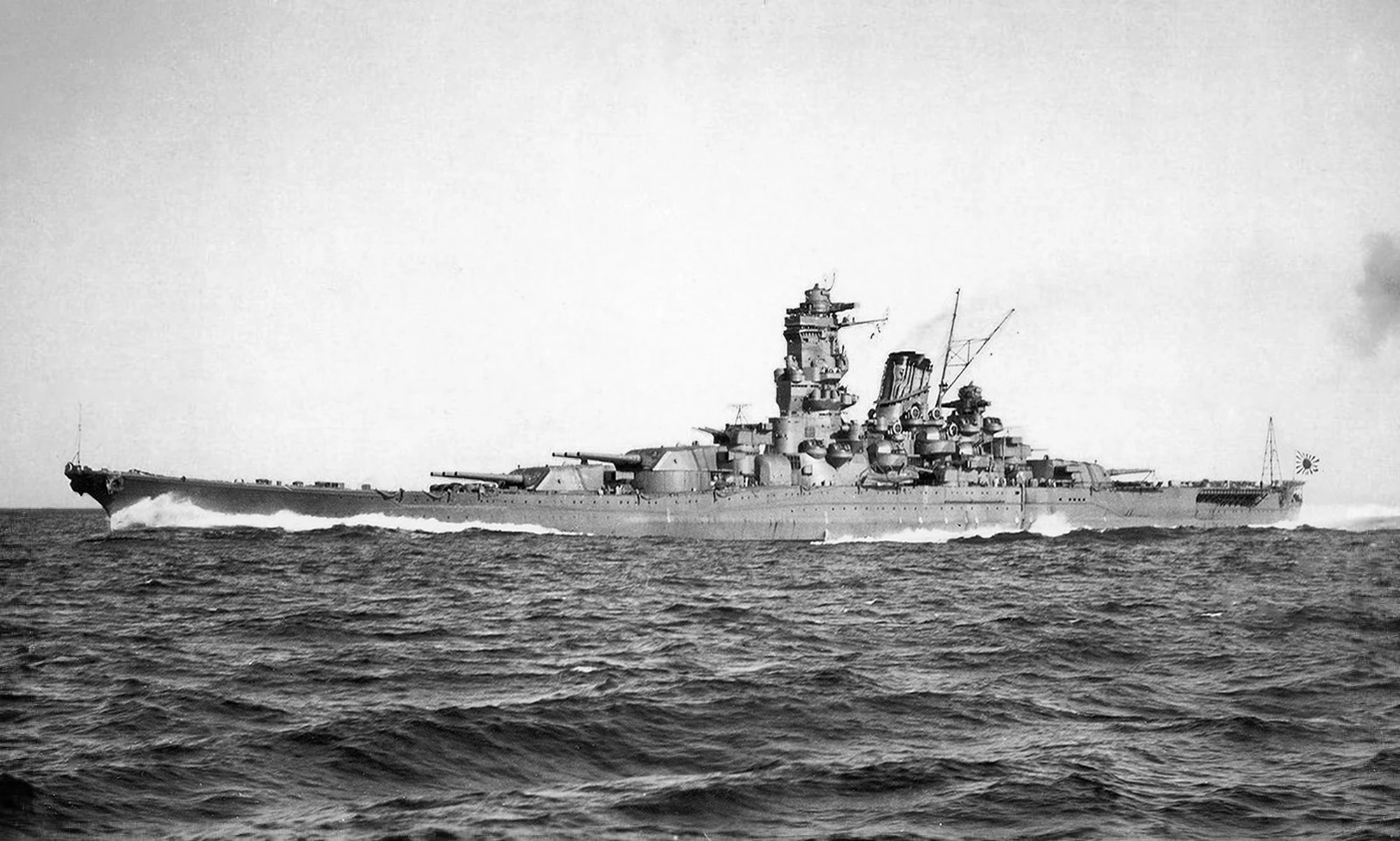
Yamato during sea trials, October 1941. It displaced 72,800 tonnes at full load.

Isoroku Yamamoto, who later masterminded the attack of Pearl Harbor, argued that Japan should remain in the treaty while Chūichi Nagumo argued against it. Yamamoto's opinion was more complex, however, in that he believed the United States could outproduce Japan by a greater factor than the 5:3 ratio because of the huge American production advantage of which he had expert knowledge since he had served with the Japanese embassy in Washington. After the signing of the treaty, he commented, "Anyone who has seen the auto factories in Detroit and the oil-fields in Texas knows that Japan lacks the power for a naval race with America." He later added, "The ratio works very well for Japan – it is a treaty to restrict the other parties." He believed that a shipbuilding spree alone wouldn't be enough to even the odds, which may have contributed to his advocacy of the plan to attack Pearl Harbor.

On December 29, 1934, the Japanese government gave formal notice that it intended to terminate the treaty. Its provisions remained in force formally until the end of 1936 and were not renewed.

== Influences of cryptography ==
What was unknown to the participants of the Conference was that the American "Black Chamber" (the Cypher Bureau, a US intelligence service), commanded by Herbert Yardley, was spying on the delegations' communications with their home capitals. In particular, Japanese communications were deciphered thoroughly, and American negotiators were able to get the absolute minimum possible deal that the Japanese had indicated they would ever accept.

As the treaty was unpopular with much of the Imperial Japanese Navy and with the increasingly active and important ultranationalist groups, the value that the Japanese government accepted was the cause of much suspicion and accusation among Japanese politicians and naval officers.

== See also ==
- Arms control

== Sources ==
- Baker, A. D. III (1989). "Battlefleets and Diplomacy: Naval Disarmament Between the Two World Wars". Warship International. XXVI (3): 217–255. ISSN 0043-0374.
- Duroselle, Jean-Baptiste (1963), From Wilson to Roosevelt: Foreign Policy of the United States, 1913-1945, Harvard University Press, ISBN 978-0-67432-650-7
- Evans, David & Peattie, Mark (1997), Kaigun: Strategy, Tactics and Technology in the Imperial Japanese Navy, 1887–1941, Annapolis: Naval Institute Press, ISBN 978-0-87021-192-8.
- Gardiner, Robert & Chesneau, Roger, eds. (1980). Conway's All the World's Fighting Ships 1922–1946. Annapolis: Naval Institute Press. ISBN 0-87021-913-8.
- Howarth, Stephen (1983), The Fighting Ships of the Rising Sun, Atheneum, ISBN 978-0-689-11402-1
- Jones, Howard (2001), Crucible of power: a history of US foreign relations since 1897, Rowman & Littlefield, ISBN 978-0-8420-2918-6
- Jordan, John (2011), Warships after Washington: The Development of Five Major Fleets 1922–1930, Seaforth Publishing, ISBN 978-1-84832-117-5
- Jordan, John & Dumas, Robert (2009). French Battleships 1922–1956. Barnsley: Seaforth Punblishing. ISBN 978-1-84832-034-5.
- Kaufman, Robert Gordon (1990), Arms Control During the Pre-Nuclear Era: The United States and Naval Limitation Between the Two World Wars, New York: Columbia University Press, ISBN 978-0-231-07136-9
- Kennedy, Paul (1983), The Rise and Fall of British Naval Mastery, London: Macmillan, ISBN 978-0-333-35094-2
- Marriott, Leo (2005), Treaty Cruisers: The First International Warship Building Competition, Barnsley: Pen & Sword, ISBN 978-1-84415-188-2
- Paine, S.C.M. (2017), The Japanese Empire: Grand Strategy from the Meiji Restoration to the Pacific War, Cambridge & New York: Cambridge, ISBN 978-1-107-01195-3
- Potter, E, ed. (1981), Sea Power: A Naval History (2nd ed.), Annapolis: Naval Institute Press, ISBN 978-0-87021-607-7
- Limitation of Naval Armament, treaty, 1922
