= List of Imperial Japanese Navy admirals =

The following is a list of the Admirals of the Imperial Japanese Navy during its existence from 1868 until 1945.

== Marshal Admirals ==
This colour along with the * (asterisk) indicates that the promotion was posthumous.

Name	Picture	Date of Rank
Saigō Jūdō		20 January 1898
Itō Sukeyuki		31 January 1906
Inoue Yoshika		31 October 1911
Tōgō Heihachirō		21 April 1913
Prince Arisugawa Takehito		7 July 1913
Ijuin Gorō		26 May 1917
Prince Higashifushimi Yorihito		27 June 1922*
Shimamura Hayao		8 January 1923*
Katō Tomosaburō		24 August 1923
Prince Fushimi Hiroyasu		27 May 1932
Yamamoto Isoroku		18 April 1943*
Nagano Osami		21 June 1943
Koga Mineichi		31 March 1944*

== Admirals ==
This colour along with the * (asterisk) indicates that the promotion was posthumous.

Name	Picture	Date of Rank
Kabayama Sukenori		10 May 1895
Yamamoto Gonnohyōe		6 June 1904
Kawamura Sumiyoshi		12 August 1904*
Samejima Kazunori		13 November 1905
Shibayama Yahachi		13 November 1905
Hidaka Sōnojō		7 August 1908
Kataoka Shichirō		1 December 1910
Kamimura Hikonojō		1 December 1910
Dewa Shigetō		9 July 1912
Uryū Sotokichi		16 October 1912
Saitō Makoto		16 October 1912
Misu Sotarō		25 September 1913
Shigetarō Yoshimatsu		1 December 1916
Fujii Kōichi		1 December 1916
Yashiro Rokurō		2 July 1918
Katō Sadakichi		2 July 1918
Yamashita Gentarō		2 July 1918
Nawa Matahachirō		2 July 1918
Murakami Kakuichi		2 July 1918
Arima Ryōkitsu		25 November 1919
Yamaya Tanin		25 November 1919
Takarabe Takeshi		25 November 1919
Kuroi Teijirō		16 August 1920
Tochinai Sojirō		16 August 1920
Nomaguchi Kaneo		16 August 1920
Suzuki Kantarō		3 August 1923
Takeshita Isamu		3 August 1923
Oguri Kōzaburō		3 August 1923
Okada Keisuke		11 June 1924
Ide Kenji		11 June 1924
Katō Hiroharu		1 April 1927
Abo Kiyokazu		1 April 1927
Hyakutake Saburō		2 April 1928
Taniguchi Naomi		2 April 1928
Yamamoto Eisuke		1 April 1931
Ōsumi Mineo		1 April 1931
Yamanashi Katsunoshin		1 April 1932
Kobayashi Seizō		1 March 1933
Nomura Kichisaburō		1 March 1933
Nakamura Ryōzō		1 March 1934
Suetsugu Nobumasa		1 March 1934
Takahashi Sankichi		1 April 1936
Fujita Hisanori		1 April 1936
Yonai Mitsumasa		1 April 1937
Hyakutake Gengo		1 April 1937
Katō Takayoshi		1 April 1939
Hasegawa Kiyoshi		1 April 1939
Oikawa Koshirō		15 November 1939
Shiozawa Kōichi		15 November 1939
Yoshida Zengo		15 November 1940
Shimada Shigetarō		15 November 1940
Toyoda Teijirō		4 April 1941
Toyoda Soemu		18 September 1941
Kondō Nobutake		29 April 1943
Takasu Shirō		1 March 1944
Nomura Naokuni		1 March 1944
Sawamoto Yorio		1 March 1944
Endō Yoshikazu		3 May 1944*
Nagumo Chūichi		8 July 1944*
Takagi Takeo		8 July 1944*
Yamagata Seigō		17 March 1945*
Itō Seiichi		7 April 1945*
Tsukahara Nishizō		15 May 1945
Inoue Shigeyoshi		15 May 1945

== Vice Admirals ==
This colour along with the * (asterisk) indicates that the promotion was posthumous.

Name	Picture	Date of Rank
Enomoto Takeaki		14 January 1874
Itō Sukemaro		21 November 1878
Nakamuta Kuranosuke		21 November 1878
Maki Nagayoshi		29 June 1885
Nire Kagenori		29 June 1885
Akamatsu Noriyoshi		26 September 1887
Itō Toshiyoshi		24 September 1890
Abo Kiyoyasu		24 September 1890
Matsumura Junzō		23 July 1891
Arichi Shinanojō		12 December 1892
Aiura Norimichi		16 February 1895
Tsuboi Kōzō		26 February 1896
Tsunoda Hidematsu		20 May 1900
Morooka Yoriyuki		24 April 1902
Arima Shinichi		24 May 1902
Kurooka Takewaki		5 September 1903
Kawahara Yōichi		5 September 1903
Matsunaga Yūju		5 September 1903
Omoto Tomomichi		12 January 1905
Arai Aritsura		23 September 1905
Kimotsuke Kaneyuki		23 September 1905
Miura Isao		23 September 1905
Inoue Yoshitomo		13 November 1905
Uemura Nagataka		13 November 1905
Uchida Masatoshi		13 November 1905
Itō Yoshigorō		13 November 1905
Hashimoto Masaaki		13 November 1905
Mukōyama Shinkichi		13 November 1905
Sakamoto Toshiatsu		13 November 1905
Yamauchi Masuji		13 November 1905
Tōgō Masamichi		30 November 1905
Miyahara Jirō		8 November 1906
Nashiba Tokioki		12 March 1907
Mochihara Heiji		12 March 1907
Kano Yūnoshin		12 March 1907
Tomioka Sadayasu		12 March 1907
Nakamizo Tokutarō		12 March 1907
Ogura Byōichirō		28 August 1908
Hikohachi Yamada		28 August 1908
Kunikane Taketomi		27 August 1909
Tamari Chikakata		1 December 1909
Kitakoga Takeichirō		1 December 1909
Izō Teragaki		1 December 1909
Matsumoto Kazu		1 December 1909
Yamamoto Yasujirō		16 September 1910
Nakao Yū		1 December 1910
Ijichi Hikojirō		1 December 1910
Saitō Kōshi		17 April 1911
Ijichi Suetaka		5 June 1911
Sakamoto Hajime		5 June 1911
Miyaoka Naoki		1 December 1911
Nomoto Tsunaakira		1 December 1911
Koizumi Kōtarō		1 December 1912
Tsuchiya Tamotsu		1 December 1912
Kawashima Reijirō		7 January 1913
Egashira Yasutarō		7 January 1913
Wada Kensuke		31 May 1913
Nishi Shinrokurō		25 September 1913
Takeda Hideo		1 December 1913
Hajime Ishibashi		1 December 1914
Sentō Takenaka		1 December 1914
Mori Yoshitarō		1 December 1914
Tadamichi Kamaya		1 December 1914
Fujimoto Hideshirō		1 December 1914
Kamiizumi Tokuya		1 December 1914
Yamagata Bunzō		1 December 1915
Yajima Junkichi		1 December 1915
Yoshimi Kenkai		1 December 1915
Eguchi Rinroku		13 December 1915
Tsuchiya Mitsukane		13 December 1915
Itō Otojirō		13 December 1915
Sekino Kenkichi		1 December 1916
Tanaka Morihide		1 December 1916
Tōgō Kichitarō		1 December 1916
Kamimura Osuke		1 December 1916
Satō Tetsutarō		1 December 1916
Matsumura Tatsuo		1 December 1916
Yamaguchi Kujūrō		1 June 1917
Iwamura Toshitake		1 December 1917
Chisaka Tomojirō		1 December 1917
Nakano Naoe		1 December 1917
Akiyama Saneyuki		1 December 1917
Date Tadakichi		1 December 1917
Ogasawara Naganari		1 December 1918
Kimura Takeshi		1 December 1918
Mori Etsutarō		1 December 1918
Yamanaka Shibakichi		1 December 1918
Tadokoro Hiromi		1 December 1918
Moriyama Keizaburō		1 December 1918
Yamaji Kazuyoshi		1 December 1918
Yasuzumi Saneyoshi		23 September 1919
Aihara Masukatsu		23 September 1919
Akiyama Tōkichi		23 September 1919
Asaoka Mitsutoshi		23 September 1919
Fukuda Umanosuke		23 September 1919
Fukunaga Kichinosuke		23 September 1919
Harada Hiroshi		23 September 1919
Honda Tadao		23 September 1919
Sawa Kannojō		23 September 1919
Kondō Motoki		23 September 1919
Kawamura Hoshū		23 September 1919
Kamaya Rokurō		1 December 1919
Asano Masayasu		1 December 1919
Nagata Yasujirō		1 December 1919
Funakoshi Kajishirō		1 December 1919
Horiuchi Saburō		1 December 1919
Nunome Mitsuzō		1 December 1920
Mukai Yaichi		1 December 1920
Kawahara Kesatarō		1 December 1920
Saitō Hanroku		1 December 1920
Yoshida Masujirō		1 December 1920
Satō Kōzō		1 December 1920
Yoshida Kiyokaze		1 December 1920
Arisaka Shōzō		1 December 1920
Yamaoka Toyokazu		1 December 1921
Yamaguchi Ei		1 December 1921
Shimomura Nobutarō		1 December 1921
Matsumura Jun'ichi		1 December 1921
Yoshioka Hansaku		1 December 1921
Iida Hisatsune		1 December 1921
Nakajima Suketomo		1 December 1921
Kumaji Kususe		1 December 1921
Tanaka Kotarō		1 June 1922
Kawada Katsuji		1 June 1922
Saitō Shichigorō		1 December 1922
Takeuchi Shigetoshi		1 December 1922
Nakazato Shigetsugu		1 December 1922
Ōkubo Tatsu		1 December 1922
Yamauchi Shirō		10 November 1923*
Kobayashi Kenzō		1 December 1923
Kuwashima Shōzō		1 December 1923
Kaneda Hidetarō		1 December 1923
Fujiwara Eizaburō		1 December 1923
Furukawa Shinzaburō		1 December 1923
Yoshikawa Yasuhira		1 December 1923
Fukamizu Sadakichi		1 December 1923
Hirano Isamu		1 December 1923
Hisano Takumi		1 December 1923
Sueo Nonaka		1 December 1923
Masaki Yoshimoto		1 December 1924
Uchida Kosaburō		1 December 1924
Ōtani Koshirō		1 December 1924
Tajiri Tadatsugu		1 December 1924
Matsushita Tōjirō		1 December 1924
Matsumura Kikuo		1 December 1924
Yuchi Teikan		20 December 1924
Ichikawa Kiyojirō		20 December 1924
Kamo Iwao		20 December 1924
Irisawa Toshio		20 December 1924
Nakajima Yosohachi		20 December 1924
Funaboshi Zenya		20 December 1924
Kisaki Kosuke		20 December 1924
Ohashi Sei		20 December 1924
Hiratsuka Tamotsu		20 December 1924
Mizutani Chimakichi		20 December 1924
Miyakawa Kunimoto		20 December 1924
Iwabe Suetaka		20 December 1924
Okazaki Teigō		20 December 1924
Masui Keijirō		20 December 1924
Ikeda Iwasaburō		20 December 1924
Iida Nobutarō		1 December 1925
Shirane Kumazō		1 December 1925
Inutsuka Tarō		1 December 1925
Komatsu Naomoto		1 December 1925
Shikama Kōsuke		1 December 1925
Tosu Tamaki		1 December 1925
Shimizu Tokuichi		1 December 1925
Amamiya Ryōshichirō		1 December 1925
Mizutani Mitsutarō		15 December 1925
Kiyokawa Jun'ichi		1 December 1926
Nagasawa Naotarō		1 December 1926
Yamashita Gihachirō		1 December 1926
Godō Takuo		1 December 1926
Hiraga Yuzuru		1 December 1926
Ogura Yoshiaki		1 December 1927
Oyamada Shigezō		1 December 1927
Kanesaka Takashi		1 December 1927
Furukawa Shirō		1 December 1927
Hatano Sadao		1 December 1927
Kawai Shuntarō		1 December 1927
Isozaki Seikichi		1 December 1927
Andō Masataka		10 December 1928
Ueda Yoshitake		10 December 1928
Ugawa Wataru		10 December 1928
Sakonji Seizō		10 December 1928
Tateno Tokujirō		10 December 1928
Hara Kanjirō		10 December 1928
Kishina Masao		30 November 1929
Ōminato Naotarō		30 November 1929
Shima Yukichi		30 November 1929
Taniguchi Yoshisada		30 November 1929
Yonemura Sueki		30 November 1929
Kishimoto Nobuta		30 November 1929
Sugi Masato		30 November 1929
Gyōbu Hitoshi		30 November 1929
Itō Kōji		30 November 1929
Nagamura Kiyoshi		30 November 1929
Araki Jirō		1 December 1930
Yasumi Saburō		1 December 1930
Imamura Shinjirō		1 December 1930
Fukusaku Ushimaru		1 December 1930
Ishikawa Tokiji		1 December 1930
Kuroda Takuma		1 December 1930
Ijichi Kiyohiro		1 December 1931
Usui Kuni		1 December 1931
Shigeoka Nobujirō		1 December 1931
Hamano Eijirō		1 December 1931
Matsuura Matsumi		1 December 1931
Matsuyama Shigeru		1 December 1931
Yuchi Shusei		1 December 1931
Yoshioka Yasusada		1 December 1931
Iritani Kiyonaga		1 December 1931
Edahara Yurikazu		1 December 1932
Kawano Tōgō		1 December 1932
Terajima Ken		1 December 1932
Matsushita Hajime		1 December 1932
Onodera Hiromu		1 December 1932
Murata Toyotarō		1 December 1932
Uemura Shigeo		1 December 1932
Kōda Naka		1 December 1932
Tamazawa Akira		1 December 1932
Fujiyoshi Akira		15 November 1933
Hori Teikichi		15 November 1933
Ichimura Hisao		15 November 1933
Matsushita Shigeru		15 November 1933
Ono Tokusaburō		15 November 1933
Takasugi Shin'ichirō		15 November 1933
Murakami Haruichi		15 November 1933
Minohara Tsutsumu		15 November 1933
Gotō Akira		15 November 1934
Inoue Tsugumatsu		15 November 1934
Maebara Kenji		15 November 1934
Niiyama Yoshiyuki		15 November 1934
Nobeta Shigeoki		15 November 1934
Ono Hiroshi		15 November 1934
Suzuki Giichi		15 November 1934
Wada Nobufusa		15 November 1934
Kobayashi Seizaburō		15 November 1934
Tsuda Shizue		15 November 1934
Arima Yutaka		15 November 1934
Sakano Tsuneyoshi		15 November 1934
Aritsuka Yoshitomo		15 November 1934
Ueda Muneshige		15 November 1934
Fukushima Hisashi		15 November 1934
Ikebe Yasuo		15 November 1934
Anno Kiyoshi		6 April 1935*
Kawamura Giichirō		15 November 1935
Watami Hōichi		15 November 1935
Hamada Kichijirō		15 November 1935
Hara Keitarō		15 November 1935
Idemitsu Manbei		15 November 1935
Inoue Chōji		15 November 1935
Nakamura Kamezaburō		15 November 1935
Ono Yaichi		15 November 1935
Yamashita Kanemitsu		15 November 1935
Yamanaka Masayuki		15 November 1935
Fusejima Tadao		15 November 1935
Arichi Jugorō		1 December 1936
Sugisaka Teijirō		1 December 1936
Hibino Masaharu		1 December 1936
Kikuno Shigeru		1 December 1936
Satō Saburō		1 December 1936
Sumiyama Tokutarō		1 December 1936
Wada Hideho		1 December 1936
Furuichi Tatsuo		1 December 1936
Kawahara Hiroshi		1 December 1936
Ujiie Nagaaki		1 December 1936
Ikeda Taiichi		1 December 1936
Kobayashi Sōnosuke		1 December 1937
Hirata Noboru		1 December 1937
Katagiri Eikichi		1 December 1937
Maeda Masaichi		1 December 1937
Otagaki Tomisaburō		1 December 1937
Wada Senzō		1 December 1937
Hara Gorō		1 December 1937
Kaneda Ichirō		1 December 1937
Yoshinari Muneo		1 December 1937
Kajimoto Kinpei		1 December 1937
Araki Hirosuke		1 December 1937
Fukuma Tadayoshi		1 December 1937
Tanaka Asazō		1 December 1937
Hidaka Kōichi		1 December 1937
Takei Daisuke		1 December 1937
Tanimoto Umatarō		15 November 1938
Furihata Satoshi		15 November 1938
Hoshino Shuichi		15 November 1938
Kawase Yoshishige		15 November 1938
Matsuzaki Iori		15 November 1938
Noda Kiyoshi		15 November 1938
Shimomura Shōsuke		15 November 1938
Satō Ichirō		15 November 1938
Hanashima Kōichi		15 November 1938
Hiraoka Iwao		15 November 1938
Osada Katsuyoshi		15 November 1938
Hosogaya Boshirō		15 November 1939
Niimi Masaichi		15 November 1939
Shimizu Mitsumi		15 November 1939
Sunagawa Kaneo		15 November 1939
Takahashi Ibō		15 November 1939
Sugiyama Toshisuke		15 November 1939
Hirose Masatsune		15 November 1939
Kondo Eijirō		15 November 1939
Kumaoka Yuzuru		15 November 1939
Mito Shunzō		15 November 1939
Miyata Giichi		15 November 1939
Iwamura Seiichi		15 November 1939
Koike Shirō		15 November 1939
Togari Takamoto		15 November 1939
Asakuma Hikokichi		15 November 1939
Tsuzuki Ishichi		15 November 1939
Hirai Hiroshi		15 November 1939
Nakano Tarō		15 November 1939
Sonoda Shigeru		7 February 1940*
Hara Kiyoshi		15 November 1940
Komatsu Teruhisa		15 November 1940
Kusaka Jin'ichi		15 November 1940
Mikawa Gun'ichi		15 November 1940
Ōkawachi Denshichi		15 November 1940
Okuma Masakichi		15 November 1940
Ozawa Jisaburō		15 November 1940
Sakamoto Ikuta		15 November 1940
Sugiyama Rokuzō		15 November 1940
Ukita Hidehiko		15 November 1940
Yamamoto Kōki		15 November 1940
Horie Rokurō		15 November 1940
Myōga Hideo		15 November 1940
Kōri Hidesaburō		15 November 1940
Ōta Taiji		15 November 1940
Shishido Yoshinobu		15 November 1940
Nikaidō Yukitake		15 November 1940
Sakurai Tadatake		15 November 1940
Shibuya Ryūtarō		15 November 1940
Ishii Tsunejirō		15 November 1940
Fukuda Keiji		15 November 1940
Hishikawa Mansaburō		15 November 1940
Honda Masuzō		15 November 1940
Mukōyama Hitoshi		15 November 1940
Suga Hikojirō		5 February 1941*
Makita Kakusaburō		15 September 1941
Kawase Shirō		15 October 1941
Kobayashi Masami		15 October 1941
Moizumi Shin'ichi		15 October 1941
Samejima Tomoshige		15 October 1941
Sukigara Tamazō		15 October 1941
Gotō Eiji		15 October 1941
Higuchi Shuichirō		15 October 1941
Matsuki Masukichi		15 October 1941
Takasu Sanjirō		15 October 1941
Inoue Yasuo		15 October 1941
Matsuura Eijirō		15 October 1941
Soejima Daisuke		15 October 1941
Tozuka Michitaro		15 October 1941
Tayui Minoru		15 October 1941
Wada Misao		15 October 1941
Yanagihara Hiromitsu		15 October 1941
Gosho Shizuka		15 October 1941
Hokotate Kin'ya		15 October 1941
Mito Yoshihiko		15 October 1941
Nabeshima Shigeaki		15 October 1941
Hori Nobuaki		15 October 1941
Yatsushiro Sukeyoshi		1 February 1942*
Obata Yoshizumi		1 April 1942
Kanazawa Masao		1 May 1942
Kobayashi Tetsuri		1 May 1942
Kurita Takeo		1 May 1942
Kuwabara Torao		1 May 1942
Oku Nobukazu		1 May 1942
Takeda Moriji		1 May 1942
Kabashima Setsuo		1 May 1942
Fukuda Ryōzō		1 May 1942
Goga Keijirō		1 May 1942
Matsunaga Jirō		1 May 1942
Soichi Kikuta		1 May 1942
Yamaguchi Tamon		5 June 1942*
Inagaki Ayao		15 September 1942*
Gotō Aritomo		12 October 1942*
Abe Hiroaki		1 November 1942
Abe Kasuke		1 November 1942
Abe Katsuo		1 November 1942
Fukudome Shigeru		1 November 1942
Hara Chūichi		1 November 1942
Hara Kenzaburō		1 November 1942
Horiuchi Shigenori		1 November 1942
Kakuta Kakuji		1 November 1942
Miwa Shigeyoshi		1 November 1942
Oka Takazumi		1 November 1942
Ugaki Matome		1 November 1942
Nakajima Torahiko		1 November 1942
Nakamura Toshihisa		1 November 1942
Soma Rokurō		1 November 1942
Oka Arata		1 November 1942
Ozawa Senkichi		1 November 1942
Suzuki Hisatake		1 November 1942
Hisatake Kaizō		1 November 1942
Tokugawa Takesada		1 November 1942
Kataoka Kakutarō		1 November 1942
Niwata Shōzō		1 November 1942
Takashi Takagi		1 November 1942
Yasuda Yoshitatsu		2 January 1943*
Satō Yasuo		3 March 1943*
Takata Rokurō		18 April 1943*
Hatakeyama Kōichirō		1 May 1943
Hiraoka Kumeichi		1 May 1943
Kishi Fukuji		1 May 1943
Ōnishi Takijirō		1 May 1943
Shima Kiyohide		1 May 1943
Suzuki Yoshio		1 May 1943
Fujita Ruitarō		1 May 1943
Jinbo Ben'ichi		1 May 1943
Shimomura Katsumi		1 May 1943
Ugaki Kanji		1 May 1943
Wakabayashi Seisaku		1 May 1943
Fujita Risaburō		1 May 1943
Satō Genzō		1 May 1943
Senō Tomoyuki		1 May 1943
Obata Aiki		1 May 1943
Iwamoto Kanae		1 May 1943
Akiyama Teruo		6 July 1943*
Isaki Shunji		12 July 1943*
Daigo Tadashige		1 November 1943
Kira Shun'ichi		1 November 1943
Maeda Minoru		1 November 1943
Marumo Kuninori		1 November 1943
Matsunaga Sadaichi		1 November 1943
Nishimura Shōji		1 November 1943
Tada Takeo		1 November 1943
Teraoka Kinpei		1 November 1943
Yamaguchi Gisaburō		1 November 1943
Shibata Yaichirō		1 November 1943
Shiroya Kiyoshi		1 November 1943
Hoshina Zenshirō		1 November 1943
Nakahara Yoshimasa		1 November 1943
Nakajima Seizaburō		1 November 1943
Sakamaki Munetaka		1 November 1943
Tokunaga Sakae		1 November 1943
Akasaka Isao		1 November 1943
Hosotani Shinzaburō		1 November 1943
Nakamura Todomu		1 November 1943
Wazumi Tokutarō		1 November 1943
Beppu Ryōzō		1 November 1943
Fukui Nobutatsu		1 November 1943
Saiko Yoshikatsu		1 November 1943
Keiji Shibazaki		25 November 1943*
Akiyama Monzō		6 February 1944*
Yamada Michiyuki		6 February 1944*
Hasegawa Kiichi		29 March 1944*
Ueno Gonta		31 March 1944*
Abe Kōsō		1 May 1944
Irifune Naosaburō		1 May 1944
Itō Kenzō		1 May 1944
Kubo Kyūji		1 May 1944
Kusaka Ryūnosuke		1 May 1944
Ōmori Sentarō		1 May 1944
Shimizu Fumio		1 May 1944
Yamazaki Shigeaki		1 May 1944
Harada Seiichi		1 May 1944
Tamura Suguru		1 May 1944
Ichise Shinichi		1 May 1944
Kobayashi Yoshiharu		1 May 1944
Morizumi Matsuo		1 May 1944
Sawa Tatsu		1 May 1944
Yamaguchi Masumi		1 May 1944
Ezaki Iwakichi		1 May 1944
Ishiguro Yoshio		1 May 1944
Nawa Takeshi		1 May 1944
Morishima Taneo		1 May 1944
Shirakami Kimitarō		1 May 1944
Yokoo Iwao		1 May 1944
Yonehana Tokutarō		1 May 1944
Ogata Masaki		3 May 1944*
Ijuin Matsuji		24 May 1944*
Monzen Tei		9 June 1944*
Yano Hideo		8 July 1944*
Itō Yasunoshin		8 July 1944*
Nakagawa Kō		8 July 1944*
Tsujimura Takehisa		8 July 1944*
Takahashi Ichimatsu		4 August 1944*
Nakahara Giichirō		7 August 1944*
Kajioka Sadamichi		12 September 1944*
Arima Masafumi		15 October 1944*
Hashimoto Shintarō		15 October 1944
Imamura Osamu		15 October 1944
Ishikawa Shigeru		15 October 1944
Kondō Kazuma		15 October 1944
Ōnishi Shinzō		15 October 1944
Sakonju Naomasa		15 October 1944
Shiraishi Kazutaka		15 October 1944
Tanaka Raizō		15 October 1944
Uwano Keizō		15 October 1944
Yamada Sadayoshi		15 October 1944
Miyazato Shutoku		15 October 1944
Hara Teizō		15 October 1944
Nishio Hidehiko		15 October 1944
Sawada Torao		15 October 1944
Kobayashi Kengo		15 October 1944
Kondō Yasuichirō		15 October 1944
Morita Kan'ichi		15 October 1944
Tada Rikizō		15 October 1944
Inoguchi Toshihira		24 October 1944*
Ban Masami		25 October 1944*
Kaizuka Takeo		25 October 1944*
Shinoda Katsukiyo		25 October 1944*
Hayakawa Mikio		11 November 1944*
Ishii Shizue		17 November 1944*
Matsumura Kanji		18 November 1944*
Shimazaki Toshio		21 November 1944*
Edo Heitarō		25 November 1944*
Senda Sadatoshi		25 December 1944*
Shibuya Shirō		12 January 1945*
Iwabuchi Sanji		26 February 1945*
Iokibe Kei		1 March 1945*
Takada Satoshi		10 March 1945*
Ichimaru Toshinosuke		17 March 1945*
Aruga Kōsaku		7 April 1945*
Kuni Asaakira		1 May 1945
Hirose Sueto		1 May 1945
Ichioka Hisashi		1 May 1945
Kamata Michiaki		1 May 1945
Kono Chimaki		1 May 1945
Kimura Susumu		1 May 1945
Kogure Gunji		1 May 1945
Mori Kunizō		1 May 1945
Osugi Morikazu		1 May 1945
Takenaka Ryūzō		1 May 1945
Kudō Kyūhachi		1 May 1945
Takayanagi Gihachi		1 May 1945
Kaneko Shigeji		1 May 1945
Yasuba Yasuo		1 May 1945
Yamaguchi Nobusuke		1 May 1945
Yamanaka Tomojirō		1 May 1945
Asakuma Toshihide		1 May 1945
Fukuda Tadashi		1 May 1945
Nishino Sadaichi		1 May 1945
Ōsuga Tomiji		1 May 1945
Tanabe Yutaka		1 May 1945
Kubo Satoshi		1 May 1945
Sugiura Kajū		16 May 1945*
Sugimoto Ushie		12 June 1945*
Ōta Minoru		13 June 1945*
Ōtsuka Miki		18 July 1945*
Kusagawa Kiyoshi		24 July 1945*
Okamura Masao		31 July 1945*
Fukuchi Hideo		17 August 1945*
Harada Kaku		25 September 1945*
Kimura Masatomi		1 November 1945
Koyanagi Tomiji		1 November 1945
Nakazawa Tasuku		1 November 1945
Takama Tamotsu		1 November 1945
Yamaguchi Jihei		1 November 1945
Arima Kaoru		1 November 1945
Mito Hisashi		1 November 1945
Yano Shikazō		1 November 1945
Enomoto Takaichirō		1 November 1945
Nakamura Gorō		1 November 1945
Ōmatsuzawa Bunpei		1 November 1945
Imada Ibuo		1 November 1945
Shimada Kiyoshi		1 November 1945

== Rear Admirals ==
This colour along with the * (asterisk) indicates that the promotion was posthumous.

Name	Picture	Date of Rank
Ijuin Kanehiro		5 November 1874
Hirotsune Kachō		13 May 1876
Yanagi Narayoshi		12 August 1880
Fukushima Takanori		26 September 1887
Motoyama Susumu		24 September 1890
Yamazaki Kagenori		24 September 1890
Isobe Kaneyoshi		26 May 1893
Tanaka Tsunatsune		1 June 1893
Kodama Toshikuni		5 June 1893
Matsumura Masanaga		25 July 1895
Satō Shizuo		25 July 1895
Sugi Morimichi		25 July 1895
Takino Naotoshi		25 July 1895
Yoshijima Tokiyasu		25 July 1895
Nomura Tadashi		5 November 1896
Ogata Koreyoshi		14 May 1898
Mori Matashichirō		16 August 1898
Miyoshi Katsumi		20 May 1900
Serata Tasuku		21 May 1900
Endō Kitarō		22 May 1900
Oda Tōru		1 November 1900
Sawa Ryōkan		27 December 1900
Sakurai Kikunosuke		1 July 1901
Shimazaki Yoshitada		6 July 1901
Fujita Sachiemon		1 February 1902
Itō Tsunesaku		1 February 1902
Funaki Rentarō		28 May 1902
Hirao Fukusaburō		28 May 1902
Hayasaki Gengo		4 June 1903
Hosoya Sukeuji		7 July 1903
Takagi Eijirō		1 June 1904
Inoue Toshio		14 June 1905
Sakai Tadatoshi		23 September 1905
Nagaaki Nakayama		2 November 1905
Ichirō Nijima		2 November 1905
Hokizo Okubo		2 November 1905
Hirō Tanji		2 November 1905
Takenobu Tokuhisa		12 December 1905
Shosaburo Fukami		26 January 1906
Sanekazu Hara		26 January 1906
Tatsuto Iwasaki		3 April 1906
Kinji Yasuhara		24 May 1906
Makoto Kaburagi		28 May 1906
Kanemasa Imai		22 November 1906
Shizuka Nakamura		22 November 1906
Tomokazu Takigawa		22 November 1906
Sadashirō Arikawa		30 November 1906
Shojirō Asai		30 November 1906
Morizane Ōta		30 November 1906
Hakaru Narukawa		30 November 1906
Kyūma Oinoue		30 November 1906
Ryōkichi Kajikawa		12 March 1907
Arinobu Matsumoto		12 March 1907
Katsuro Narita		12 March 1907
Shinjirō Uehara		12 March 1907
Heitarō Takenouchi		27 December 1907
Kōsaku Iwamoto		28 December 1907
Rinroku Ide		28 August 1908
Sukekazu Takagi		28 August 1908
Toshiyoshi Imaizumi		28 August 1908
Ichibei Mori		28 August 1908
Noritada Niwa		28 August 1908
Otomaru Gejo		28 August 1908
Gunkichi Nagai		1 December 1909
Genzaburo Ogi		1 December 1909
Kōkichi Kimura		1 December 1909
Masayoshi Fukui		1 December 1910
Ichiro Ishida		1 December 1910
Yoshimoto Shoji		1 December 1910
Kurakichi Tonami		1 December 1910
Terugoro Fujii		1 December 1910
Katsuhiko Hirose		12 April 1911
Kiyozo Oda		12 April 1911
Mamoru Okumiya		12 April 1911
Naōmi Matsumura		12 April 1911
Sadatoki Miyaji		17 April 1911
Gitarō Ishii		1 December 1911
Sukeshiro Hanabusa		1 December 1911
Toyonari Sayama		1 December 1911
Juzaburo Ushida		1 December 1911
Mitsuji Yoda		1 December 1911
Sango Obana		1 December 1911
Teiichi Hirabe		1 December 1911
Sanechika Nishiyama		12 July 1912
Tarozō Yamasumi		1 December 1912
Kishi Arakawa		1 December 1912
Shichisaburo Hideshima		1 December 1912
Seinosuke Tōgō		1 December 1912
Naranosuke Yamada		1 December 1912
Iwajiro Mano		1 December 1912
Tetsuzo Tsuchiyama		1 December 1912
Tarozo Yamasumi		1 December 1912
Yasukichi Nishiyama		15 February 1913
Hikoshichi Kubota		31 March 1913
Kiyotomo Tsukiyama		31 March 1913
Kishichiro Osawa		24 May 1913
Ichitaro Nakajima		1 December 1913
Tsunekichi Uemura		1 December 1913
Katsuya Kitano		25 March 1914
Matakichiro Hashimoto		31 March 1914
Shigetada Hideshima		29 May 1914
Kanetane Imai		29 May 1914
Kintaro Inouchi		29 May 1914
Sadaichi Hiraoka		1 December 1914
Tsunematsu Kondō		1 December 1914
Yoshiomi Mori		1 December 1914
Hajime Mizumachi		1 December 1915
Jirō Takeuchi		1 December 1915
Eitarō Kataoka		13 December 1915
Komajirō Machida		13 December 1915
Hideo Oguro		13 December 1915
Fujimatsu Okano		13 December 1915
Masatake Oshima		13 December 1915
Shichitaro Takagi		13 December 1915
Juntaro Hirose		13 December 1915
Shūzō Matsuoka		13 December 1915
Jutaro Yoshijima		13 December 1915
Samakitsu Ezura		13 December 1915
Chugo Arakawa		1 December 1916
Keijirō Aranishi		1 December 1916
Tokutarō Hiraga		1 December 1916
Koki Hirose		1 December 1916
Fusajiro Nomura		1 December 1916
Takeshi Shima		1 December 1916
Teiichiro Shitsuda		1 December 1916
Seigo Hara		1 December 1916
Sakinta Kawano		1 December 1916
Chikatami Honda		1 December 1917
Yushichi Kanno		1 December 1917
Chunojo Koyamada		1 December 1917
Kimata Kubo		1 December 1917
Danichi Nanri		1 December 1917
Yujiro Nishio		1 December 1917
Eitaro Shimodaira		1 December 1917
Terufusa Hori		1 December 1917
Shigetaka Seki		1 December 1917
Mitsuki Kaneko		1 December 1917
Noritoshi Sakamoto		10 August 1918
Kutsumi Tsuneo		1 December 1918
Yoshima Akizawa		1 December 1918
Shigeushi Nakagawa		1 December 1918
Takanosuke Oyama		1 December 1918
Naosuke Shiraishi		1 December 1918
Mitsuyoshi Okada		1 December 1918
Tsuneo Kuzumi		1 December 1918
Hikosaburo Maruhashi		1 December 1918
Fusataro Haraguchi		1 August 1919
Bunshiro Aihara		23 September 1919
Gosaku Akamine		23 September 1919
Tsunetaka Fujita		23 September 1919
Uchuji Ishiguro		23 September 1919
Sumikata Ishihara		23 September 1919
Yasukichi Itō		23 September 1919
Kaneyoshi Iwamura		23 September 1919
Hideo Mano		23 September 1919
Kankai Totsuka		23 September 1919
Jotarō Yano		23 September 1919
Kojūrō Nozaki		1 December 1919
Toshi Ijūin		1 December 1919
Tsuneha Sano		1 December 1919
Meiji Tōjō		1 December 1919
Kanshiro Haji		1 December 1919
Kiyotsugu Kanemaru		1 December 1919
Masaki Nakamura		1 December 1919
Kanta Shimanouchi		1 December 1919
Kensuke Yotsumoto		1 December 1919
Takayori Masuda		1 December 1919
Yujirō Katō		1 December 1919
Kinsaburo Mimura		1 December 1919
Shinkichi Murakami		1 December 1919
Takeshi Yoshida		1 December 1919
Kōtarō Akiba		1 December 1919
Naohide Iwano		1 December 1919
Heihachi Nakagawa		1 December 1919
Keiichi Ebihara		1 December 1920
Teisuke Fukuda		1 December 1920
Hiroshi Furukawa		1 December 1920
Yoshihiro Morimoto		1 December 1920
Masumi Sakurai		1 December 1920
Sukejirō Inutsuka		1 December 1920
Moshiro Iwasaki		1 December 1920
Genjiro Katsuki		1 December 1920
Morishige Ouchida		1 December 1920
Hisamori Taguchi		1 December 1920
Shinsuke Shinozaki		1 December 1920
Masuzo Fujita		1 December 1920
Shizen Komaki		1 December 1921
Tetsutarō Imaizumi		1 December 1921
Hidesaburō Ishikawa		1 December 1921
Tamisaburō Miyaji		1 December 1921
Kametarō Muta		1 December 1921
Tarō Hanabusa		1 December 1921
Shōsaku Harada		1 December 1921
Shokichi Oishi		1 December 1921
Komakichi Sekida		1 December 1921
Jirō Tsukudo		1 December 1921
Kōichi Masuda		1 December 1921
Heishirō Omi		1 December 1921
Sukeichi Yasumura		1 December 1921
Hisashi Yokō		1 December 1921
Kumatarō Fukushima		1 December 1921
Shinjirō Yamamoto		1 December 1922
Ichirō Fukuda		1 December 1922
Jirō Nangō		1 December 1922
Kanari Kabayama		1 December 1922
Kinji Hidaka		1 December 1922
Motō Hiraiwa		1 December 1922
Saburō Hitomi		1 December 1922
Takeshi Koyama		1 December 1922
Seiichi Kurose		1 December 1922
Tanetsugu Sosa		1 December 1922
Shujirō Suganuma		1 December 1922
Kazu Takemitsu		1 December 1922
Kichiji Ueda		1 December 1922
Nobuo Uemura		1 December 1922
Tomoyoshi Usagawa		1 December 1922
Denichi Yamaguchi		1 December 1922
Kenzo Yutani		1 December 1922
Genji Ide		1 December 1922
Hidejirō Okamura		1 December 1922
Daijirō Iguchi		1 December 1922
Shigemitsu Seki		1 December 1922
Kyutaro Iida		1 December 1922
Yoichi Inagawa		1 December 1922
Seiichiro Iwano		1 December 1922
Itaru Tateno		1 December 1922
Toru Otawara		30 April 1923
Tohei Aoki		1 December 1923
Kaname Eguchi		1 December 1923
Norikazu Kanna		1 December 1923
Otohiko Kagara		1 December 1923
Taizō Kawai		1 December 1923
Chikaharu Koizumi		1 December 1923
Yoshitada Mikami		1 December 1923
Rekizō Miyamura		1 December 1923
Hatsuji Mori		1 December 1923
Hachirō Murakoshi		1 December 1923
Tateki Seki		1 December 1923
Kanichi Taketomi		1 December 1923
Heigo Teraoka		1 December 1923
Yasuzo Torisaki		1 December 1923
Joji Yokochi		1 December 1923
Setsuo Takahashi		1 December 1923
Sadasuke Yoshitake		1 December 1923
Keizaburō Arai		1 December 1923
Seiichi Hattori		1 December 1923
Yoshiro Hayashi		1 December 1923
Kaku Endo		1 December 1924
Hiroaki Tamura		1 December 1924
Heizaburō Fukuyo		1 December 1924
Mitsuteru Ide		1 December 1924
Kōichi Kishii		1 December 1924
Moritsugu Kumashiro		1 December 1924
Raizō Mori		1 December 1924
Torai Nakajo		1 December 1924
Teiji Sakamoto		1 December 1924
Nobunari Shiraishi		1 December 1924
Jutarō Takahashi		1 December 1924
Ritsuto Takahashi		1 December 1924
Tamaki Watanabe		1 December 1924
Ryōkichi Odera		1 December 1924
Hiroaki Tamura		1 December 1924
Ryō Fukuda		1 December 1924
Junpei Fukui		1 December 1924
Shoichi Iwasa		1 December 1924
Naonori Yamamoto		20 December 1924
Tsurunosuke Yamazaki		20 December 1924
Takeshirō Akimoto		20 December 1924
Shoichi Anju		20 December 1924
Fumio Arao		20 December 1924
Itsushi Fujie		20 December 1924
Iwao Fujisawa		20 December 1924
Tatsusaburo Tonami		20 December 1924
Tomizo Suzuki		20 December 1924
Kumaroku Hidejima		20 December 1924
Shigeji Itō		20 December 1924
Kōzō Miyake		20 December 1924
Yoshihiko Mizutani		20 December 1924
Ichiemon Nakajima		20 December 1924
Tadashi Oki		20 December 1924
Atsuyuki Shigehisa		20 December 1924
Ototetsu Tanabe		20 December 1924
Nobujiro Tomioka		20 December 1924
Masayasu Yokoyama		20 December 1924
Okikuni Noguchi		20 December 1924
Ryūtarō Onuma		20 December 1924
Tokujirō Kazama		20 December 1924
Koshirō Saitō		20 December 1924
Kojirō Suetsugu		20 December 1924
Bunsaku Kaneko		20 December 1924
Kanichi Kimura		20 December 1924
Tomitaro Kurita		20 December 1924
Kanji Murakami		20 December 1924
Aishichi Ouchi		20 December 1924
Yutaka Takeuchi		20 December 1924
Tatsuo Tanaka		20 December 1924
Sukefuyu Yanagisawa		20 December 1924
Tekizo Kawakami		20 December 1924
Torakichi Miyazaki		20 December 1924
Teijirō Honjo		20 December 1924
Toshinori Kawaji		20 December 1924
Toyosuke Makino		20 December 1924
Kōtarō Takemura		20 December 1924
Shunkai Maki		20 December 1924
Kenzō Gotō		20 December 1924
Morio Matsudaira		1 December 1925
Kesaichi Hitsuda		1 December 1925
Takumi Matsumoto		1 December 1925
Kumagoro Migita		1 December 1925
Teijirō Murase		1 December 1925
Susumu Nakajima		1 December 1925
Kenkichi Wada		1 December 1925
Ryōji Takahashi		1 December 1925
Umakichi Yano		1 December 1925
Tamotsu Kanzaki		1 December 1925
Hikoshichi Matsubara		1 December 1925
Toshio Sumida		1 December 1925
Kunimitsu Hattori		1 December 1925
Masayuki Hattori		1 December 1925
Kensuke Fujii		1 December 1926
Minoru Morita		1 December 1926
Morie Tokiwa		1 December 1926
Tanin Ikeda		1 December 1926
Kiyoshi Ishikawa		1 December 1926
Yozō Kaneko		1 December 1926
Saburō Kanoe		1 December 1926
Tatsuzō Kawamura		1 December 1926
Sukejirō Miyasaka		1 December 1926
Kinichi Mukoda		1 December 1926
Meijirō Tachi		1 December 1926
Chikateru Takasaki		1 December 1926
Isamu Tanaka		1 December 1926
Katsutarō Taoka		1 December 1926
Morie Tokiwa		1 December 1926
Masaharu Ozoegawa		1 December 1926
Masaoki Yamada		1 December 1926
Shigekichi Wakao		1 December 1926
Sakuzo Yoshizawa		1 December 1926
Tojiro Kishida		1 December 1926
Tōkichi Kodachi		1 December 1926
Yoshikatsu Nishi		1 December 1926
Yoshio Nitta		1 December 1926
Kyōsuke Suetsune		1 December 1926
Shunkan Ishikura		1 December 1926
Shuhei Isono		1 December 1926
Kurō Endo		1 December 1927
Shirō Inoue		1 December 1927
Miozō Kuroyanagi		1 December 1927
Katsuyuki Nishizaki		1 December 1927
Naojirō Honshuku		1 December 1927
Naokata Kondō		1 December 1927
Taihachi Kose		1 December 1927
Rokuya Mashiko		1 December 1927
Gonkichi Nakajima		1 December 1927
Tomonobu Nakayama		1 December 1927
Ikuo Okamoto		1 December 1927
Minokichi Satō		1 December 1927
Masao Sugiura		1 December 1927
Inosuke Tokuda		1 December 1927
Tomio Ōta		1 December 1927
Takezo Koizumi		1 December 1927
Masanao Hashimoto		1 December 1927
Kichisuke Komori		10 December 1928
Sunao Matsuzaki		10 December 1928
Taizō Ogura		10 December 1928
Shinichi Oguri		10 December 1928
Satoru Onomoto		10 December 1928
Shirō Otani		10 December 1928
Yoshio Takita		10 December 1928
Iwajirō Torin		10 December 1928
Takeo Yajima		10 December 1928
Nobuichi Yamaguchi		10 December 1928
Tokuya Kiyoto		10 December 1928
Tadahiko Kido		10 December 1928
Yasutami Takeuchi		10 December 1928
Masafuyu Imazawa		10 December 1928
Tomoyoshi Yamashita		10 December 1928
Aijirō Tomioka		16 October 1929*
Kenkichi Akabori		30 November 1929
Masao Hayashi		30 November 1929
Shirō Ijichi		30 November 1929
Minoru Hirota		30 November 1929
Otsusaburō Masuda		30 November 1929
Minoru Nagai		30 November 1929
Shichihei Ōta		30 November 1929
Keiichi Ichikizaki		30 November 1929
Kizō Isumi		30 November 1929
Nobuyoshi Kikui		30 November 1929
Keitarō Honda		30 November 1929
Eikichi Ishiko		30 November 1929
Ryōji Mitsuoka		30 November 1929
Masayuki Hori		30 November 1929
Kinsaburo Imai		30 November 1929
Masakichi Imayoshi		30 November 1929
Shigetomo Suzuki		1 May 1930*
Motosuke Mito		1 December 1930
Toyonaka Yamauchi		1 December 1930
Wasuke Komaki		1 December 1930
Noboru Katayama		1 December 1930
Shinpei Kida		1 December 1930
Denzō Mihori		1 December 1930
Nihei Sezaki		1 December 1930
Shiba Shibayama		1 December 1930
Junzō Yoshitake		1 December 1930
Kenichi Ikenaka		1 December 1930
Kanekoto Iwamura		1 December 1930
Sanmatsu Kanaya		1 December 1930
Ryō Ishihara		1 December 1930
Toraroku Akiyama		1 December 1931
Isao Monai		1 December 1931
Makoto Kawase		1 December 1931
Toma Uematsu		1 December 1931
Masato Hattori		1 December 1931
Daijirō Ichikawa		1 December 1931
Shigemoto Kawamura		1 December 1931
Akira Kuragano		1 December 1931
Chuza Matsumoto		1 December 1931
Tatsuo Sagara		1 December 1931
Tadayuki Takeda		1 December 1931
Seishichi Yamaguchi		1 December 1931
Hideji Nagao		1 December 1931
Bungoro Abe		1 December 1931
Rokurō Hani		1 December 1932
Hajime Tachibana		1 December 1932
Takeji Teramoto		1 December 1932
Seizaburō Mitsui		1 December 1932
Minoru Sonoda		1 December 1932
Chonan Yamaguchi		1 December 1932
Kiyoshi Kitagawa		1 December 1932
Yasuo Ko		1 December 1932
Tadashi Kurata		1 December 1932
Toshirō Tajiri		1 December 1932
Jun Takano		1 December 1932
Toyohei Kazama		1 December 1932
Kanefusa Nakao		1 December 1932
Sashichi Sumi		1 December 1932
Norimasa Tada		1 December 1932
Ritsunosuke Hozumi		1 December 1932
Chozo Takamatsu		1 December 1932
Takashi Ando		15 November 1933
Kenzō Awanohara		15 November 1933
Tokuzō Esaka		15 November 1933
Toshiu Higurashi		15 November 1933
Fukumatsu Hisahara		15 November 1933
Haruo Kitaoka		15 November 1933
Katsuji Masaki		15 November 1933
Tasuku Murakami		15 November 1933
Jurō Nagoya		15 November 1933
Toshihide Nanri		15 November 1933
Jirō Ōnishi		15 November 1933
Teisuke Shirane		15 November 1933
Sekizō Uno		15 November 1933
Tadao Nakamichi		15 November 1933
Toshihiko Ono		15 November 1933
Totaro Tomikawa		15 November 1933
Tsuneji Aida		15 November 1933
Kikuo Fujimoto		15 November 1933
Zenji Ikuta		15 November 1933
Sadaaki Araki		15 November 1934
Masaki Shibayama		15 November 1934
Kiichirō Honda		15 November 1934
Haruma Izawa		15 November 1934
Soichi Kasuya		15 November 1934
Shinichirō Machida		15 November 1934
Taichi Miki		15 November 1934
Jō Morimoto		15 November 1934
Shunichi Okada		15 November 1934
Kenichi Sada		15 November 1934
Osamu Satō		15 November 1934
Masaki Shibayama		15 November 1934
Hiroyoshi Tabata		15 November 1934
Shirō Nishio		15 November 1934
Chuji Yamada		15 November 1934
Seiji Katayama		15 November 1934
Shinichi Yoshida		15 November 1934
Mitsuru Goga		15 November 1934
Tsuneo Hayashida		15 November 1934
Heisaku Ikeda		15 November 1934
Hiroshige Imai		29 July 1935*
Shimazu Tadashige		15 November 1935
Yasutarō Iwashita		15 November 1935
Fuchina Iwaihara		15 November 1935
Kentarō Kojima		15 November 1935
Kasuke Suzuki		15 November 1935
Kunji Tange		15 November 1935
Katsumi Yukishita		15 November 1935
Risaburō Itō		15 November 1935
Ryūkichi Nakajima		15 November 1935
Yoshinosuke Owada		15 November 1935
Tadashige Shimazu		15 November 1935
Kunishige Taketomi		15 November 1935
Minoru Suda		15 November 1935
Chikaharu Ujiie		15 November 1935
Itaru Okimoto		15 November 1935
Yasutaka Hashiguchi		15 November 1935
Yoshiyuki Hiki		15 November 1935
Katsuji Kawano		3 September 1936*
Kichihei Adachi		1 December 1936
Tsuneo Amari		1 December 1936
Kaneji Kishimoto		1 December 1936
Seiichirō Fujimori		1 December 1936
Toshio Matsunaga		1 December 1936
Michimoto Nakayama		1 December 1936
Tadao Honda		1 December 1936
Shigekazu Nakamura		1 December 1936
Gunpei Sekine		1 December 1936
Shinji Suzuki		1 December 1936
Seizō Matsuno		1 December 1936
Jirō Narita		1 December 1936
Jirō Saito		1 December 1936
Hideo Takahashi		1 December 1936
Kanae Waki		1 December 1936
Minoru Yamaguchi		1 December 1936
Sugao Yokoyama		1 December 1936
Shozo Nomura		1 December 1936
Saijirō Tachibana		1 December 1936
Ritsuma Kinashi		1 December 1936
Kanichi Fukada		1 December 1936
Toshiyoshi Ishiguro		1 December 1936
Tsuyoshi Kobata		1 December 1937
Atsushi Kasuga		1 December 1937
Kōhei Ochi		1 December 1937
Teizō Mitsunami		1 December 1937
Seizō Sakabe		1 December 1937
Takeo Sakura		1 December 1937
Seishirō Satō		1 December 1937
Takeo Takasaki		1 December 1937
Hisaharu Kubota		1 December 1937
Kyūjirō Nakasugi		1 December 1937
Kōkichi Terada		1 December 1937
Tsunemitsu Yoshida		1 December 1937
Hideo Kakehashi		1 December 1937
Fujio Kumabe		1 December 1937
Kiyoshi Yamada		1 December 1937
Toshitsugu Kuwakubo		1 December 1937
Kenshirō Oshima		9 March 1938*
Nitarō Katō		31 July 1938*
Muneshige Aoyagi		15 November 1938
Setsuzō Araki		15 November 1938
Mitsuru Yamada		15 November 1938
Ko Kiyomiya		15 November 1938
Teizō Iikura		15 November 1938
Shirō Oshima		15 November 1938
Kiyoshi Hio		15 November 1938
Jin Kimura		15 November 1938
Hajime Miyata		15 November 1938
Kenji Takeoka		15 November 1938
Kikuji Tsuchida		15 November 1938
Chiaki Imokawa		15 November 1938
Kikuji Okuda		4 November 1939*
Junpei Yamamoto		15 November 1939
Unosuke Akasaka		15 November 1939
Keizō Chiba		15 November 1939
Toyokichi Kaneko		15 November 1939
Mokichi Sakai		15 November 1939
Kiyoyasu Sasaki		15 November 1939
Tadakazu Satō		15 November 1939
Seigo Takatsuka		15 November 1939
Junichi Mizuno		15 November 1939
Takeshi Motoizumi		15 November 1939
Kazuo Nakamura		15 November 1939
Suketsugu Terada		15 November 1939
Tsunao Kitano		15 November 1939
Tadashi Ono		15 November 1939
Yutaka Ono		15 November 1939
Shuji Hirata		15 November 1939
Shin Arakawa		15 November 1939
Hayato Hara		15 November 1939
Chikayuki Hotta		15 November 1939
Masao Tsuzuki		15 November 1939
Tsutomu Hamano		29 April 1940
Teizō Matsuo		29 June 1940*
Hirosuke Ishigurō		15 November 1940
Shigeyoshi Katō		15 November 1940
Mitsuharu Matsuyama		15 November 1940
Tokusaburō Ozumi		15 November 1940
Tsutomu Satō		15 November 1940
Sadakichi Shitabo		15 November 1940
Setsuzō Yoshitomi		15 November 1940
Kanki Iwagoe		15 November 1940
Saichirō Tomonari		15 November 1940
Giemon Ueda		15 November 1940
Eiichi Mizuno		15 November 1940
Sakae Taneda		15 November 1940
Katsuji Tsuda		15 November 1940
Masaru Nagamatsu		15 November 1940
Iori Ono		15 November 1940
Shinnosuke Muneyuki		1 March 1941*
Kiyoharu Toyama		25 August 1941*
Teizaburō Fukuda		15 October 1941
Gonichirō Kakimoto		15 October 1941
Hisao Katō		15 October 1941
Sohei Tashirō		15 October 1941
Chōzō Suzuki		15 October 1941
Teizō Nippa		15 October 1941
Namizō Satō		15 October 1941
Makito Takenouchi		15 October 1941
Tashirō Kataoka		15 October 1941
Rokuzō Unoike		15 October 1941
Kensuke Nagano		15 October 1941
Taizō Kurohara		15 October 1941
Osamu Sugimoto		15 October 1941
Mutsumi Akune		15 October 1941
Toshitaka Inui		15 October 1941
Wasaburo Iwasaki		15 October 1941
Sōkichi Fukaya		17 December 1941*
Yusuke Yoshimi		22 December 1941*
Yukio Katō		17 January 1942*
Tsutomu Shibata		19 January 1942*
Shusaku Shibuya		24 January 1942*
Toshio Otake		27 January 1942*
Tetsushirō Ishikawa		1 March 1942*
Iwao Shimizu		2 March 1942*
Takatsugu Jōjima		1 May 1942
Katsuzō Akiyama		1 May 1942
Yugorō Hori		1 May 1942
Masatsugu Hoshino		1 May 1942
Hiroshi Kurose		1 May 1942
Ichirō Hisae		1 May 1942
Seiji Mizui		1 May 1942
Tokuji Mori		1 May 1942
Sakan Itagaki		1 May 1942
Fusazo Murakami		1 May 1942
Motoji Nakamura		1 May 1942
Shigemasa Hara		1 May 1942
Taizō Mihara		1 May 1942
Saburō Nomiya		1 May 1942
Mantaro Shimamoto		1 May 1942
Isao Todo		4 May 1942*
Takeo Kawana		4 May 1942*
Shojirō Matsumoto		12 May 1942*
Kiyoshi Suzuki		12 May 1942*
Chuji Takebayashi		12 May 1942*
Masao Kawaguchi		4 June 1942*
Jisaku Okada		4 June 1942*
Ryūsaku Yanagimoto		4 June 1942*
Tomeo Kaku		5 June 1942*
Shakao Sakiyama		7 June 1942*
Hidenori Maruyama		16 June 1942*
Kōichi Satō		30 July 1942*
Shigetoshi Miyazaki		7 August 1942*
Hisao Koizumi		8 August 1942*
Yuji Yamada		28 August 1942*
Yukie Konishi		30 August 1942*
Matao Morikawa		7 September 1942*
Shirō Yasutake		11 September 1942*
Kōichi Itagaki		15 September 1942*
Hachirō Naotsuka		21 September 1942*
Kiyonobu Nakajima		22 October 1942*
Toshio Akiyoshi		1 November 1942
Yoshirō Fujii		1 November 1942
Shingo Ishikawa		1 November 1942
Tadao Yokoi		1 November 1942
Kanji Ogawa		1 November 1942
Kanae Kosaka		1 November 1942
Chozaemon Obata		1 November 1942
Kiyoshi Hamada		1 November 1942
Noboru Ishizaki		1 November 1942
Takahiko Kiyota		1 November 1942
Katsumi Komazawa		1 November 1942
Tomoyuki Matsuoka		1 November 1942
Tomoichi Mori		1 November 1942
Shunsaku Nabeshima		1 November 1942
Hidetsuna Yagi		1 November 1942
Tsunekichi Fukuzawa		1 November 1942
Takerō Koda		1 November 1942
Minoru Katsuno		1 November 1942
Tojirō Kondō		1 November 1942
Kuraji Hayakawa		1 November 1942
Yoshio Katō		1 November 1942
Kiyoshi Matsukasa		1 November 1942
Tokuo Okano		1 November 1942
Shigeki Tokito		1 November 1942
Masayoshi Umebayashi		1 November 1942
Takeyasu Minagawa		1 November 1942
Jirō Saba		1 November 1942
Saburō Tokitsu		1 November 1942
Mizuhiko Watanabe		1 November 1942
Seitaro Arai		1 November 1942
Nobu Arita		1 November 1942
Kosaburō Gotō		1 November 1942
Ryuzaburo Hasebe		1 November 1942
Torahiko Inada		1 November 1942
Nobuo Katō		1 November 1942
Kazuo Yoshii		1 November 1942
Sunao Yoshikawa		1 November 1942
Hiroshi Imazato		11 November 1942*
Moichi Narita		11 November 1942*
Yusuke Yamada		13 November 1942*
Masao Sawa		14 November 1942*
Mikio Ihara		25 November 1942*
Yoshisuke Okamoto		27 November 1942*
Toshio Shimizu		30 November 1942*
Ichirō Togami		6 January 1943*
Kenji Asai		13 January 1943*
Einojo Terada		13 January 1943*
Nobunosuke Ōta		11 February 1943*
Seizō Wada		29 March 1943*
Keizō Teragaki		20 April 1943*
Keishi Ishii		1 May 1943
Chiaki Matsuda		1 May 1943
Teijirō Yamazumi		1 May 1943
Takeo Aruga		1 May 1943
Makoto Awaya		1 May 1943
Morihiko Miki		1 May 1943
Denzaburō Emoto		1 May 1943
Sōkichi Takagi		1 May 1943
Sueo Ōbayashi		1 May 1943
Yoshiyuki Ichimiya		1 May 1943
Hideo Kojima		1 May 1943
Noboru Owada		1 May 1943
Hisagorō Shimamoto		1 May 1943
Shozō Hashimoto		1 May 1943
Giichirō Horie		1 May 1943
Kazuō Horiuchi		1 May 1943
Mitsuo Kinoshita		1 May 1943
Akira Matsuzaki		1 May 1943
Isamu Takeda		1 May 1943
Kikumatsu Tanaka		1 May 1943
Shin'ichi Torigoe		1 May 1943
Ichihei Yokokawa		1 May 1943
Yasurō Tanaka		1 May 1943
Seishichi Watanabe		1 May 1943
Masakazu Ishibashi		1 May 1943
Tsunejirō Katahara		1 May 1943
Yuzō Ishido		1 May 1943
Masata Matsubara		1 May 1943
Masao Ishii		1 May 1943
Hayato Mikoshiba		1 May 1943
Hajime Mukuno		1 May 1943
Sadao Nakano		1 May 1943
Tokuichi Ogawa		1 May 1943
Tojirō Shimada		1 May 1943
Tamenori Hidaka		1 May 1943
Eizo Imaizumi		1 May 1943
Yuzo Ishikawa		1 May 1943
Yoshio Kubota		1 May 1943
Takeo Murakami		1 May 1943
Matahiko Adachi		1 May 1943
Jirō Aiura		1 May 1943
Susumu Anzawa		1 May 1943
Hiroshi Gondō		1 May 1943
Seiichi Hasegawa		1 May 1943
Teikichi Hayakawa		1 May 1943
Tatsumi Idebuchi		1 May 1943
Arata Inaoka		1 May 1943
Hideo Kuwahara		1 May 1943
Kinsaku Kandatsu		1 May 1943
Michitaka Nakamura		1 May 1943
Gunji Yakabe		1 May 1943
Seitarō Hara		29 May 1943*
Korō Ōno		8 June 1943*
Teruhiko Miyoshi		8 June 1943*
Kishaku Yoshimura		8 June 1943*
Akiyoshi Fujii		15 June 1943*
Tomejirō Tamaki		21 June 1943*
Kanetomo Nomaguchi		11 July 1943*
Torajirō Satō		12 July 1943*
Hideo Tajima		14 July 1943*
Jotarō Itō		22 July 1943*
Masao Nakamura		22 July 1943*
Sukeichi Yamazaki		4 August 1943*
Toraji Hidai		5 August 1943*
Shigeki Ando		21 August 1943*
Kyosuke Mizuno		28 August 1943*
Nagaaki Hioka		1 September 1943
Gorō Tezuka		7 October 1943*
Kenzō Noda		8 October 1943*
Yasuhide Setoyama		13 October 1943*
Takeji Miyazaki		24 October 1943*
Keizō Komura		1 November 1943
Shinzaburō Hase		1 November 1943
Sukezō Adachi		1 November 1943
Masao Aoki		1 November 1943
Kameto Kuroshima		1 November 1943
Sadatoshi Tomioka		1 November 1943
Masao Ueno		1 November 1943
Katsuhei Nakamura		1 November 1943
Tametsugu Okada		1 November 1943
Kinji Senda		1 November 1943
Michio Sumikawa		1 November 1943
Bunjirō Yamaguchi		1 November 1943
Kozo Nishina		1 November 1943
Takeji Ono		1 November 1943
Yoshiaki Itō		1 November 1943
Nobukichi Tsuruoka		1 November 1943
Jisaku Uozumi		1 November 1943
Yonejirō Hisamune		1 November 1943
Yasuji Nobutani		1 November 1943
Minoru Tōgō		1 November 1943
Takuji Katahira		1 November 1943
Takeo Mori		1 November 1943
Takashi Namikawa		1 November 1943
Yoshikane Higuchi		1 November 1943
Kiichirō Shoji		2 November 1943*
Aritaka Aihara		4 November 1943
Nobuki Nakaoka		5 November 1943*
Motō Nagao		13 November 1943*
Tadamitsu Kawagoe		13 November 1943*
Yoshiyuki Hirata		21 November 1943*
Kiyoshi Kikkawa		24 November 1943*
Kiyoto Kagawa		24 November 1943*
Hiroshi Okubo		30 November 1943*
Tadashi Ara		3 December 1943*
Hideo Kumagaya		3 December 1943*
Tomesaburō Okura		4 December 1943*
Fukashi Kamijo		8 December 1943*
Yasumasa Watanabe		18 December 1943*
Michio Sugimoto		28 December 1943*
Takashi Doi		12 January 1944*
Kuichirō Takehara		14 January 1944*
Bunji Furukawa		16 January 1944*
Mitsuyoshi Tomari		16 January 1944*
Torao Ishiguro		18 January 1944*
Ryūzo Wakatsuki		25 January 1944*
Tei Seki		31 January 1944*
Eiju Iwagami		2 February 1944*
Hitoshi Sonoyama		6 February 1944*
Sumihisa Wada		6 February 1944*
Masaji Yamagata		6 February 1944*
Sorokurō Morino		6 February 1944*
Johei Wakisaka		6 February 1944*
Kanichi Hagiwara		6 February 1944*
Toshio Murata		6 February 1944*
Shigenobu Tadaki		6 February 1944*
Yuhao Kamo		13 February 1944*
Hideo Aoyama		17 February 1944*
Kenma Isohisa		17 February 1944*
Tamekiyo Oda		17 February 1944*
Yoshio Kanemasu		17 February 1944*
Yoshizo Nakamaruo		17 February 1944*
Ryūtarō Shimizu		17 February 1944*
Kikuta Maki		17 February 1944*
Takatomo Matsuda		18 February 1944*
Kame Harada		21 February 1944*
Ei Kashiwagi		22 February 1944*
Matsurō Eguchi		23 February 1944*
Kazutaka Niimi		23 February 1944*
Nobuki Ogawa		24 February 1944*
Senzaburō Tonomura		25 February 1944*
Toshihide Maejima		1 March 1944*
Rinzō Kurosaki		2 March 1944*
Tetsushirō Fukuzawa		2 March 1944*
Tarō Shimizu		5 March 1944*
Nobuo Konno		13 March 1944*
Suetada Itokawa		18 March 1944*
Hajime Kobayashi		26 March 1944*
Fumio Kitamura		30 March 1944*
Yoshitane Yanagimura		31 March 1944*
Kuranosuke Yanagisawa		31 March 1944*
Shin Ōkubo		1 April 1944*
Masamitsu Miyamoto		1 April 1944*
Tozaburō Ogura		13 April 1944*
Senkichi Amano		19 April 1944*
Bunji Asakura		1 May 1944
Masamichi Ikeuchi		1 May 1944
Naoji Doi		1 May 1944
Keijō Minato		1 May 1944
Hideo Hiraide		1 May 1944
Kenroku Fujita		1 May 1944
Naoshirō Fujiyoshi		1 May 1944
Mitsuru Nagai		1 May 1944
Katsuji Hattori		1 May 1944
Goroku Kimoto		1 May 1944
Akira Kuroda		1 May 1944
Heishirō Nishida		1 May 1944
Yuzuru Okuma		1 May 1944
Katsuya Satō		1 May 1944
Akira Sone		1 May 1944
Tamotsu Furukawa		1 May 1944
Yukitake Hanada		1 May 1944
Jun Isobe		1 May 1944
Goichi Kuroki		1 May 1944
Shinji Ogura		1 May 1944
Shirō Satō		1 May 1944
Yoshimi Suehirō		1 May 1944
Yoshioki Tawara		1 May 1944
Shozō Tominaga		1 May 1944
Kyoho Hamanaka		1 May 1944
Tatsuo Kiyama		1 May 1944
Nisuke Masuda		1 May 1944
Akira Morikawa		1 May 1944
Tsuruji Kikuchi		1 May 1944
Ryūkichi Tamura		1 May 1944
Shigeyasu Nishioka		1 May 1944
Shojirō Mizusaki		1 May 1944
Tokujirō Yokoyama		1 May 1944
Sakae Terayama		1 May 1944
Minoru Tanaka		1 May 1944
Jinshichi Saeki		1 May 1944
Hideo Kawano		1 May 1944
Kiichiro Nishioka		1 May 1944
Hozo Tahara		1 May 1944
Seizō Katsumata		1 May 1944
Kiroku Mataga		1 May 1944
Yoshiyuki Amari		1 May 1944
Kyōji Tsutsumi		1 May 1944
Motoharu Kitamura		1 May 1944
Kanji Matsuyama		1 May 1944
Shinichi Itō		1 May 1944
Yoshimitsu Iwanari		1 May 1944
Seiji Naruse		1 May 1944
Yushirō Wada		3 May 1944*
Tetsuo Onitsuka		3 May 1944*
Rokurō Kono		3 May 1944*
Kan Mori		7 May 1944*
Fuji Arimura		10 May 1944*
Toshiaki Fukumura		15 May 1944*
Zenjirō Shibata		30 May 1944*
Tetsushirō Emi		31 May 1944*
Tsuneo Orita		7 June 1944*
Shizuo Akazawa		8 June 1944*
Masashichi Shirahama		8 June 1944*
Tōyō Mitsunobu		9 June 1944*
Josuke Ichimura		10 June 1944*
Yoshikichi Shoji		12 June 1944*
Katsuji Nakano		13 June 1944*
Toshiie Irisa		19 June 1944*
Kiyoshi Tomonari		19 June 1944*
Taiji Hirai		20 June 1944*
Ryōnosuke Katō		25 June 1944*
Seiki Nakatsu		30 June 1944*
Sanji Takashima		2 July 1944*
Sadae Chiya		6 July 1944*
Saburō Ashina		8 July 1944*
Miyoshi Horinouchi		8 July 1944*
Tomojirō Kaneoka		8 July 1944*
Saburō Kondō		8 July 1944*
Masayasu Tsuji		8 July 1944*
Ryō Mori		8 July 1944*
Kakuo Kishikawa		8 July 1944*
Saburō Ishise		8 July 1944*
Akiyoshi Mizumoto		8 July 1944*
Shuji Shinki		8 July 1944*
Kaneyoshi Furukawa		8 July 1944*
Yasuchika Kayabara		12 July 1944*
Takashi Yamada		12 July 1944*
Shigeri Takeshita		16 July 1944*
Takeji Yamada		17 July 1944*
Shogo Narahara		19 July 1944*
Masamori Inose		22 July 1944*
Takakazu Kinashi		26 July 1944*
Yutaka Sugimoto		29 July 1944*
Kanzō Miura		30 July 1944*
Hitoshi Awanohara		2 August 1944*
Yoshitake Miwa		2 August 1944*
Goichi Oie		2 August 1944*
Iwao Oka		4 August 1944*
Fukashi Kawai		8 August 1944*
Yoshio Kamei		10 August 1944*
Toshiharu Tamaki		16 August 1944*
Toshi Kubota		18 August 1944*
Shigoro Uchida		18 August 1944*
Keizaburō Sugiura		19 August 1944*
Tetsushirō Emi		26 August 1944*
Seiji Yamada		26 August 1944*
Takahide Miki		31 August 1944*
Saisuke Hashimoto		8 September 1944*
Masayuki Kitamura		9 September 1944*
Sukehiko Hosoya		12 September 1944*
Kozō Kimura		17 September 1944*
Minegorō Kameyama		18 September 1944*
Kotora Shiwa		21 September 1944*
Hachirō Nakao		22 September 1944*
Kozo Suzuki		23 September 1944*
Sotokichi Ogura		24 September 1944*
Shirō Nakajima		30 September 1944*
Chonosuke Murakami		6 October 1944*
Tsuto Araki		15 October 1944
Akira Yamaki		15 October 1944
Kamenosuke Yamamori		15 October 1944
Chikao Yamamoto		15 October 1944
Ichirō Aitoku		15 October 1944
Jirō Ban		15 October 1944
Akitomo Beppu		15 October 1944
Kanei Chudo		15 October 1944
Zensuke Kanome		15 October 1944
Shirō Fujinaga		15 October 1944
Kiyoma Fujiwara		15 October 1944
Hankyū Sasaki		15 October 1944
Nobuichi Yoshimi		15 October 1944
Noboru Nakase		15 October 1944
Toshitane Takada		15 October 1944
Tameki Nomoto		15 October 1944
Shigetada Horiuchi		15 October 1944
Itsu Ishihara		15 October 1944
Minoru Matsuo		15 October 1944
Tomekichi Nomura		15 October 1944
Shigematsu Sakaibara		15 October 1944
Kazue Shigenaga		15 October 1944
Shigechika Hayashi		15 October 1944
Tadao Katō		15 October 1944
Tomozō Kikuchi		15 October 1944
Yuji Kobe		15 October 1944
Hiroshi Matsubara		15 October 1944
Takeshi Matsumoto		15 October 1944
Nobuei Morishita		15 October 1944
Yoshio Uehara		15 October 1944
Keiichi Ōnishi		15 October 1944
Yūji Takahashi		15 October 1944
Ishinosuke Izawa		15 October 1944
Shoichi Kamata		15 October 1944
Ikuya Seki		15 October 1944
Eisho Saito		15 October 1944
Fujimasa Ushio		15 October 1944
Saburō Kishindo		15 October 1944
Tatsuo Ohashi		15 October 1944
Enjirō Kusakabe		15 October 1944
Susumu Tahara		15 October 1944
Rokukichi Takeda		15 October 1944
Toshio Okumura		15 October 1944
Meijirō Satō		15 October 1944
Shigenobu Nishizawa		15 October 1944
Tsukasa Suzuki		15 October 1944
Hiroshi Furuno		15 October 1944
Tadashi Kobayashi		15 October 1944
Kikuo Nanba		15 October 1944
Shūzō Ōe		15 October 1944
Tomihei Sakagami		15 October 1944
Isaburō Watanabe		15 October 1944
Masa Kitagawa		15 October 1944
Toshio Yokota		15 October 1944
Shinichi Araki		15 October 1944
Yoriharu Ko		15 October 1944
Mitsu Iwasaki		15 October 1944
Matsujirō Yamataka		18 October 1944*
Nobutoyo Takeshita		19 October 1944*
Keizō Domen		23 October 1944*
Ranji Ōe		23 October 1944*
Toshio Takagi		23 October 1944*
Kimitake Koshino		24 October 1944*
Teizō Nagai		24 October 1944*
Minoru Kariya		24 October 1944*
Gunji Kimura		25 October 1944*
Eiichirō Jō		25 October 1944*
Yoshiyuki Kishi		25 October 1944*
Iwata Yamamoto		25 October 1944*
Teizō Yamauchi		25 October 1944*
Shigetaka Amano		25 October 1944*
Norihide Ando		25 October 1944*
Takeo Kamikawa		25 October 1944*
Setsuji Moriya		25 October 1944*
Jō Tanaka		25 October 1944*
Ryō Toma		25 October 1944*
Uroku Hashimoto		25 October 1944*
Shigenori Kumon		25 October 1944*
Toshiharu Ozaki		25 October 1944*
Kanji Yano		25 October 1944*
Tsutomu Hirata		25 October 1944*
Kameshirō Takahashi		25 October 1944*
Saiji Norimitsu		25 October 1944*
Ko Higuchi		25 October 1944*
Rokurō Noguchi		25 October 1944*
Hanzo Motozawa		25 October 1944*
Eiichi Nakaya		25 October 1944*
Itaru Irie		25 October 1944*
Yoshio Inoue		27 October 1944*
Gosaburo Noguchi		27 October 1944*
Enpei Kanōka		5 November 1944*
Takashi Kawasaki		5 November 1944*
Yoshitane Kisaka		8 November 1944*
Kokichi Mizuno		10 November 1944*
Yasuatsu Suzuki		11 November 1944*
Sei Azukizawa		17 November 1944*
Tamotsu Tanii		21 November 1944*
Hiroshi Yoshimatsu		21 November 1944*
Toma Sugi		21 November 1944*
Misao Maruyama		21 November 1944*
Soichirō Hitomi		25 November 1944*
Kiichirō Wakita		25 November 1944*
Yūji Sanada		25 November 1944*
Toshio Abe		29 November 1944*
Noboru Nakamura		29 November 1944*
Katsumi Yokote		29 November 1944*
Kaname Konishi		19 December 1944*
Tamon Aoki		19 December 1944*
Yasuhira Kondō		19 December 1944*
Saburō Kase		21 December 1944*
Yoshishige Amaya		26 December 1944*
Yoshiichirō Akamatsu		29 December 1944*
Ikkan Okano		6 January 1945*
Ji'ichi Iwagami		8 January 1945*
Kiyohiko Shinoda		8 January 1945*
Shigekazu Shimazaki		9 January 1945*
Shosuke Yamagata		11 January 1945*
Midori Matsumura		12 January 1945*
Saburō Watanabe		21 January 1945*
Toshihiko Odawara		25 January 1945*
Yutaka Honma		25 January 1945*
Moriichi Akinaga		27 January 1945*
Kohyo Kamioka		28 January 1945*
Tsutomu Watanabe		8 February 1945*
Akira Itagaki		17 February 1945*
Yoshio Katō		25 February 1945*
Masami Kajiwara		4 March 1945*
Naoe Amano		5 March 1945*
Tokujirō Fukuoka		10 March 1945*
Saburō Tamura		17 March 1945*
Taizō Saitō		17 March 1945*
Samaji Inoue		17 March 1945*
Saburō Matsunaga		17 March 1945*
Kimikata Nagamine		17 March 1945*
Wataru Hirokawa		17 March 1945*
Kakusuke Ozawa		19 March 1945*
Yoshito Sakata		31 March 1945*
Seijirō Minamide		31 March 1945*
Takanobu Sasaki		1 April 1945*
Kyūgo Yagi		6 April 1945*
Yūji Yamamoto		7 April 1945*
Shirō Hayashi		7 April 1945*
Hisao Kotaki		7 April 1945*
Shin'ichi Uchino		7 April 1945*
Yoshio Kawashima		9 April 1945*
Eitarō Ankyū		12 April 1945*
Yasushi Kawano		12 April 1945*
Akira Ikeda		14 April 1945*
Yoshio Yamamoto		1 May 1945
Jitsue Akishige		1 May 1945
Seiho Arima		1 May 1945
Keikichi Araki		1 May 1945
Shinpei Asano		1 May 1945
Giichi Ban		1 May 1945
Sadakatsu Minobe		1 May 1945
Etsuzō Kurihara		1 May 1945
Masaharu Kawabata		1 May 1945
Iwao Kawai		1 May 1945
Tarō Taguchi		1 May 1945
Ichirō Yokoyama		1 May 1945
Tadashi Maeda		1 May 1945
Mitsutarō Gotō		1 May 1945
Masahira Hirai		1 May 1945
Masuzo Izuchi		1 May 1945
Haruō Katsuta		1 May 1945
Shigezo Kawai		1 May 1945
Katsuji Kondō		1 May 1945
Nobuo Niijima		1 May 1945
Sakae Takada		1 May 1945
Kaoru Takeuchi		1 May 1945
Kaoru Umetani		1 May 1945
Toshiyuki Yokoi		1 May 1945
Chitoshi Ishizuka		1 May 1945
Hayao Miura		1 May 1945
Hisashi Miyoshi		1 May 1945
Kiyomi Shibuya		1 May 1945
Megumi Iso		1 May 1945
Tarohachi Shinoda		1 May 1945
Kanichi Takatsugi		1 May 1945
Keizō Tanimoto		1 May 1945
Hitoshi Kojima		1 May 1945
Chihirō Nakajima		1 May 1945
Tokushi Itakura		1 May 1945
Takasue Kose		1 May 1945
Tsutomu Ogata		1 May 1945
Shinshirō Soma		1 May 1945
Toshimi Satō		1 May 1945
Jirō Tōgō		1 May 1945
Tadayuki Matsura		1 May 1945
Tomosaburō Miura		1 May 1945
Shigeharu Kitagawa		1 May 1945
Seizō Yamada		1 May 1945
Keinosuke Ikeda		1 May 1945
Yuzo Toriyama		1 May 1945
Fujio Ibusuki		1 May 1945
Shukichi Gotō		1 May 1945
Matsuo Hirao		1 May 1945
Sadayoshi Ise		1 May 1945
Jinpei Masuda		1 May 1945
Tozo Hirose		1 May 1945
Teizō Morita		1 May 1945
Tamesaburō Segawa		1 May 1945
Kakuzo Urano		1 May 1945
Arito Yatsugi		1 May 1945
Sugizo Dobeta		1 May 1945
Isami Furukawa		1 May 1945
Sengorō Nakagaki		1 May 1945
Masaaki Harada		1 May 1945
Masato Honma		1 May 1945
Shoichi Ichijo		1 May 1945
Kazuo Igawa		1 May 1945
Masuta Ikeya		1 May 1945
Noboru Inomata		1 May 1945
Shun Itakura		1 May 1945
Shunkichi Itō		1 May 1945
Tadahide Itō		1 May 1945
Sukeyoshi Hosoya		8 May 1945*
Kōji Shikata		10 May 1945*
Yūjirō Miya		13 May 1945*
Kumatarō Nakao		16 May 1945*
Nobukichi Takahashi		16 May 1945*
Itaru Ono		16 May 1945*
Hiroshi Hayashi		27 May 1945*
Masao Ikegami		3 June 1945*
Nao Eguchi		4 June 1945*
Seizō Konishi		5 June 1945*
Koun Abe		8 June 1945*
Nenosuke Nakamura		10 June 1945*
Hitoshi Tanamachi		13 June 1945*
Jirō Haneda		13 June 1945*
Shinchirō Maekawa		13 June 1945*
Yasuo Fukuyoshi		13 June 1945*
Gunichi Hamano		13 June 1945*
Satoshi Imada		18 June 1945*
Chinae Kawasaki		9 July 1945*
Sutezō Tomita		15 July 1945*
Teiji Higuchi		18 July 1945*
Kakurō Mutaguchi		24 July 1945*
Fukujirō Izumi		28 July 1945*
Sadachika Miyamoto		6 August 1945*
Teiichi Tsuzuki		7 August 1945*
Morio Fukami		8 August 1945*
Ryūsuke Horie		12 August 1945*
Shigeharu Kawasaki		20 August 1945*
Hideyoshi Katō		30 August 1945*
Shigenori Kami		15 September 1945*
Eigoro Takeshita		19 October 1945*
Tetsujirō Wada		29 October 1945*
Yoshijirō Imaizumi		1 November 1945
Tadasu Mizoguchi		1 December 1945*
Shōzō Kobayashi		9 December 1945*
Tamotsu Ōishi		13 February 1946*
