= TEI =

Tei may refer to:

Places

- Tei, Bucharest, a neighborhood in Bucharest, Romania
- Tei Tong Tsai, a village on Lantau Island, Hong Kong.

Chemistry

- Tellurium monoiodide

People

- Tei (singer) (born 1983), Korean pop singer
- Tei Abal (1932–1994) a member of the parliament of Papua New Guinea
- Tei Chiew-Siah Malaysian-born writer who produces works in Chinese and English
- Tei Fuku (1330–????) Chinese politician and diplomat of the Ryukyu Kingdom
- Tei Junsoku (1663–1734), Confucian scholar and government official of the Ryūkyū Kingdom
- Tei Mante (born 1949) Ghanaian investment banker
- Tei Monzen (died 1944) Japanese vice admiral
- Tei Ninomiya (1887–????) Japanese educator
- Tei Saito (1907–1991) Japanese politician
- Tei Seki (died 1944) Japanese rear admiral
- Tei Shi (born 1989), Colombian and Canadian singer, songwriter, and record producer
- Karen Tei Yamashita, (born 1951) American writer
- Daniele Tei, (1946–2011) Italian Air Force general
- Dulcie Tei, Tongan politician and Member of the Legislative Assembly of Tonga
- Hajime Tei, (born 1959) Japanese neuroscientist
- Poasi Tei, (born 1967) Tongan politician
- Ryōsuke Tei, (born 1968) Japanese animator, director and founder of graphic and creative design studio Furi Furi
- Sandister Tei, Ghanaian journalist and Wikimedian
- Shō Tei, (1645–1709) the 11th King of the Second Shō Dynasty of the Ryukyu Kingdom
- Towa Tei, (born 1964) Japanese artist, record producer, and DJ

Other uses

- Tei culture, a Bronze Age archaeological culture located in southern Romania and northern Bulgaria
- Tellurium monoiodide, a chemical compound with the formula TeI

TEI may refer to:

- Tarlac Electric
- Text Encoding Initiative, a consortium that develops standards for digital texts
- Technological Educational Institute, a type of tertiary education institute in Greece
- Terminal Endpoint Identifier (TEI), together with Service Access Point Identifier (SAPI) the unique identification of terminal equipment in the ISDN DSS1 standard
- Tertiary Education Institution in New Zealand
- Tezu Airport in India (IATA code)
- Total Economic Impact, a financial metric (see Application Portfolio Management)
- Trans Earth Injection, the procedure that a spacecraft performs to get back into the Earth's gravitational influence
- Transgenerational epigenetic inheritance
- Triethylindium, a chemical compound
- Tusaş Engine Industries, a Turkish aircraft engine manufacturer
