= Tatsuo Matsumura =

Tatsuo Matsumura may refer to:

- Tatsuo Matsumura (actor) (1914–2005), Japanese actor
- Tatsuo Matsumura (admiral) (1868–1932), Imperial Japanese Navy admiral
