= Saneyoshi =

Saneyoshi (written: 實好 or 実吉) is a Japanese surname. Notable people with the surname include:

- Noritada Saneyoshi (實好 礼忠, born 1972), Japanese footballer
- Saneyoshi Yasuzumi (実吉 安純, 1848–1932), Japanese physician and admiral
