= Tsunejirō =

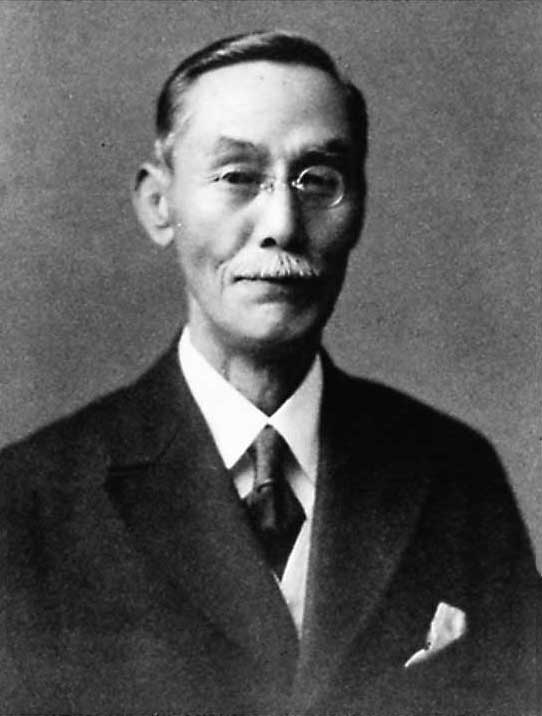
- Tsunejiro Tomita (1865–1937), Japanese judoka
- Pronunciation: tsɯnedʑiɾoɯ (IPA)
- Gender: Male

Origin
- Origin: Japanese
- Meaning: Different meanings depending on the kanji used

Other names
- Alternative spelling: Tuneziro (Kunrei-shiki) Tuneziro (Nihon-shiki) Tsunejirō, Tsunejirou, Tsunejiro (Hepburn)

Tsunejirō is a masculine Japanese given name.

== Written forms ==
Tsunejirō can be written using different combinations of kanji characters. Here are some examples:

The characters used for "jiro" (二郎 or 次郎) literally means "second son" and usually used as a suffix to a masculine name, especially for the second child. The "tsune" part of the name can use a variety of characters, each of which will change the meaning of the name ("常" for usual, "恒" for always, "毎" and so on).

- 常二郎, "usual, second son"
- 常次郎, "usual, second son"
- 恒二郎, "always, second son"
- 恒次郎, "always, second son"
- 毎二郎, "every, second son"
- 庸二郎, "usual, second son"

Other combinations...

- 常治郎, "usual, to manage/cure, son"
- 常次朗, "usual, next, clear"
- 恒治郎, "always, to manage/cure, son"
- 恒次朗, "always, next, clear"
- 毎次朗, "every, next, clear"

The name can also be written in hiragana つねじろう or katakana ツネジロウ.

== Notable people with the name ==
- Tsunejirō Ishii (石井 常次郎; 1887–1951), Imperial Japanese Navy admiral.
- Tsunejiro Tanji (丹治 恆次郎, born 1935), Japanese author.
- Tsunejiro Tomita (富田 常次郎; 1865–1937), Japanese judoka.
