= Kan Mori =

Japanese Imperial Navy rear admiral (died 1944)

- 森 寛
- The 48th graduating class in the Etajima Naval Academy in July 1920
- Born: Okayama, Japan
- Died: May 7, 1944; Saipan, Northern Mariana Islands
- Education: Etajima Naval Academy; Torpedo School; Naval Gunnery School
- Military career
- Allegiance: Empire of Japan
- Branch: Imperial Japanese Navy
- Service years: 1920–1944
- Rank: Rear admiral (posthumously)
- Units: Iwate, Tama, Kiku, Numakaze, Haruna, Hakaze, Hatsuyuki, Kinu, Uranami, Chitose
- Commands: Wakatake, Nokaze, Kikuzuki, Sawakaze
- Conflicts: World War II †

Kan Mori (森 寛, Mori Kan; died 7 May 1944) was a rear admiral in the Imperial Japanese Navy. He was from Okayama. He was killed in the last months of World War II.

He was a graduate of Etajima Naval Academy Class 48 on 16 July 1920, ranking 146th of 172 cadets.

== Assignments ==
He was posted to the armored cruiser Iwate, remaining aboard until 9 April 1921, when he was reassigned to the light cruiser Tama. He was promoted Ensign on 1 June 1921, and on 1 December of that year was ordered to attend the Torpedo School, graduating from its basic course on 8 April 1922. He was immediately ordered to the Naval Gunnery School, graduating from its Basic course on 12 July 1922, and was posted to the destroyer Kiku. On 30 May 1923, he was assigned to the destroyer Numakaze, and promoted Sub-Lieutenant on 1 December. He remained aboard Numakaze until 1 December 1924.

On 1 September 1925, he was appointed a Division Officer aboard battle cruiser Haruna, being promoted to Lieutenant on 1 December of that year. He remained aboard Haruna until 1 February 1926, when he was appointed Torpedo Officer of the destroyer Hakaze. On 1 December 1926, he returned to the Torpedo School, graduating from its Advanced course on 1 December 1927. He was appointed Torpedo Officer of the destroyer Hatsuyuki on 20 September 1929, then Torpedo Officer of the light cruiser Kinu on 1 November 1930, and Torpedo Officer of the destroyer Uranami on 1 December 1931.

He received his first command, the destroyer Wakatake on 1 December 1932, and was promoted Lieutenant Commander on 15 November 1933. On 22 October 1934, he assumed command of the destroyer Nokaze, remaining in that post until 23 May 1935. On 15 June 1935, he assumed command of the destroyer Kikuzuki until 20 June 1936, and was appointed commanding officer of the destroyer Sawakaze from 1 December 1936 - 15 November 1937.

He was promoted Commander on 15 November 1938, and served as Executive Officer of the seaplane carrier Chitose from 1 November 1940 - 20 August 1941.

== Death ==
Promoted Captain on 1 May 1943, he was appointed Director of the 1st Naval Replenishment Department on 28 January 1944, and died on Saipan under unknown circumstances on 7 May. He was posthumously promoted to rear admiral.

The Japanese Dōmei news agency reported on 22 September 1944 that he had "died in action" but gave no details.

The dispatch, recorded by a Federal Communications Commission monitor, said that the Yokosuka naval station, near Tokyo, had listed him as a fatality.
