= Japanese destroyer Hatsuyuki =

At least three warships of Japan have borne the name Hatsuyuki:

- Japanese destroyer Hatsuyuki (1906), a Kamikaze-class destroyer launched in 1906 and scrapped in 1928
- Japanese destroyer Hatsuyuki (1928), a Fubuki-class destroyer launched in 1928 and sunk in 1943
- JDS Hatsuyuki (DD-122), a Hatsuyuki-class destroyer launched in 1980 and decommissioned in 2010
