= Teragaki Izō =

Japanese Vice Admiral (1857–1938)

Teragaki Izō Junior Fourth Rank
- 寺垣猪三
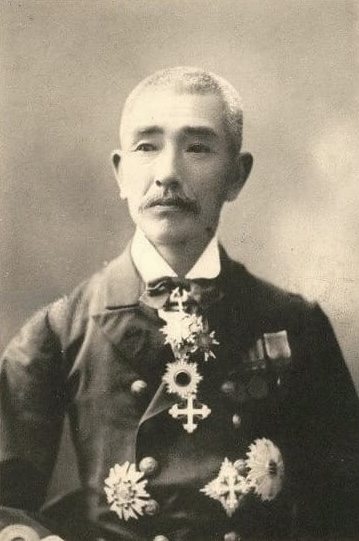
- Born: February 22, 1857; Kaga Domain, Tokugawa
- Died: June 1, 1938 (aged 81); Location Unknown
- Military career
- Allegiance: Japan
- Branch: Imperial Japanese Navy
- Service years: 1879 – 1912
- Rank: Vice Admiral
- Conflicts: First Sino-Japanese War; Boxer Rebellion; Russo-Japanese War; Battle of Tsushima
- Other work: Advisor of the Fukoku Mutual Life Insurance Company

Teragaki Izō (寺垣猪三, 22 February 1857 – 01 June 1938) was a Vice Admiral of the Imperial Japanese Navy. During the Russo-Japanese War, he commanded the Japanese battleship Shikishima during the Battle of Tsushima as a Commander.

== Family ==
Teragaki was born as the eldest son of the Teragaki family who were a clan of the Kaga Domain. Teragaki's eldest son, Kōzō, was a naval Commander and his second son, Keizō, was a Rear Admiral of the Navy who died during the Pacific War. His eldest daughter married Kodama Takaaki and his second daughter married Tamura Hiroaki. He also adopted the daughter of Admiral Dewa Shigetō.

== Naval Academy ==
In July 1873, Major Archibald Lucius Douglas and 33 other instructors were invited from the Royal Navy as naval advisors to modernize the Imperial Japanese Navy. Until then, the military school education had been strongly influenced by the Royal Dutch Navy since the end of the Edo period, but Douglas started his own style of education that emphasized practical discipline such as onboard training as well as mental preparation. Douglas' methods were sometimes opposed by Yamamoto Gonnohyōe and others, but his motto "Always be five minutes ahead of schedule" became one of the five pillars of the Imperial Japanese Navy mantra. This group of instructors led by Douglas laid the foundation for the Imperial Japanese Naval Academy. Teragaki enrolled the academy in October 1873 as one of the 6th class of the academy. In addition to the Douglas group, Teragaki received the guidance of Kondō Makoto, Itō Toshiyoshi, Arai Yukan, Miura Isao and others. After undergoing on-the-job training with the IJN Kenkō, IJN Kongō and IJN Tsukuba, he became an ensign of the Navy in August 1979.

== Naval career ==
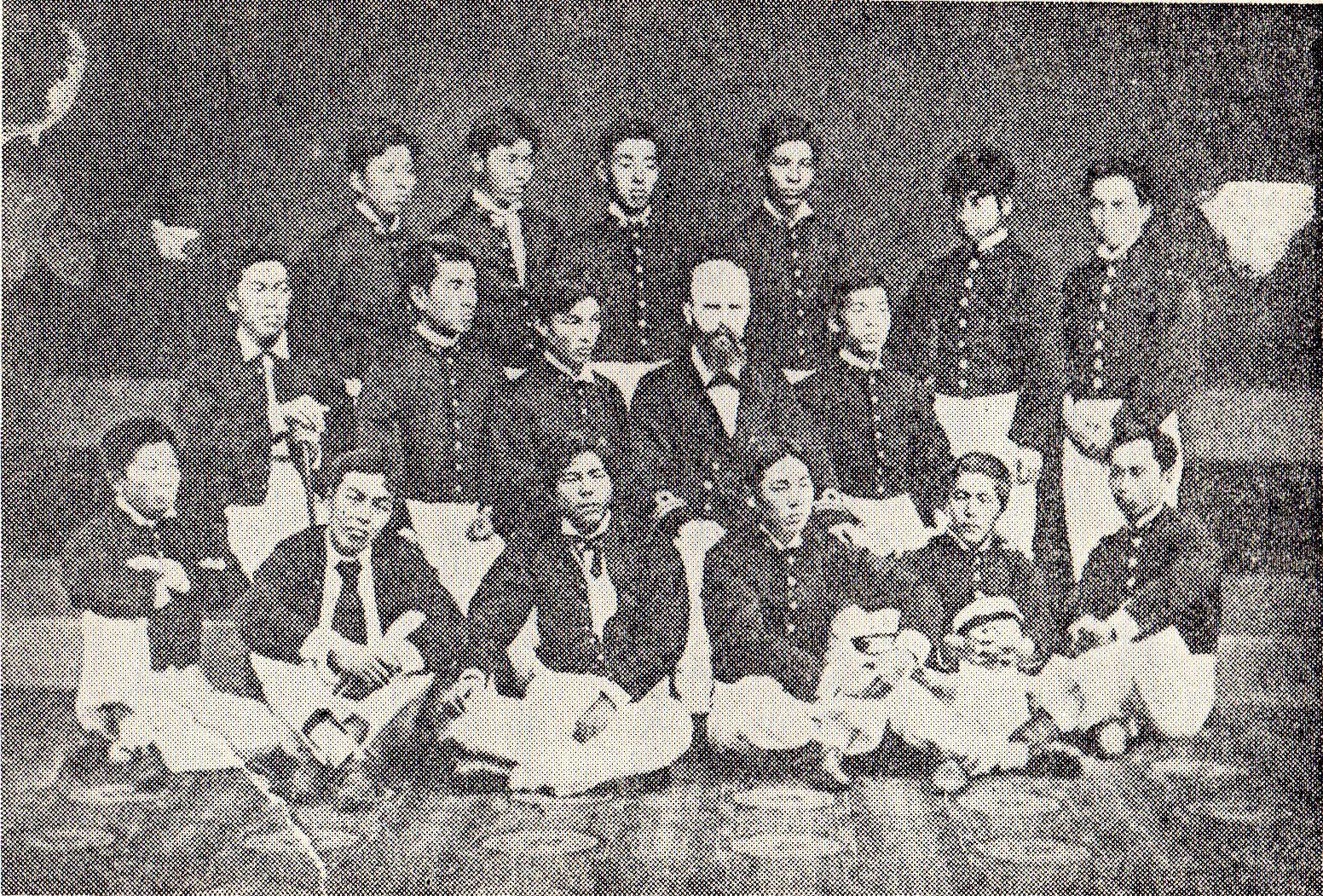
The 6th Graduates of the Japanese Naval Academy.

After working as a ship crew and a Marine Auditor, Teragaki became a Naval War College student. The students of the college were equivalent to later class A students who were selected from Captain Nishite Guns, Water, Navigation, and Aircraft Departments and be recommended from the Teachers of Each Department, an Instructor of each department, and an Officer of the Departments of the Naval Forces for one year or more and the selected students would receive one year of education. Teragaki continued to complete the course with the Jingei to practice torpedo art and was awarded a certificate of eligibility for torpedo chief. Teragaki then became an officer specializing in torpedoes, and took up mainly torpedo-related duties from the captain to the major era. In March 1894, he traveled to England as a round trip committee member of the Tatsuta. When the First Sino-Japanese War broke out in July and the Tatsuta was detained in Aden by Britain, which was a neutral country. Teragaki returned to Japan in September and served as a sea instructor and commander of the Yokosuka torpedo laying corps, but when the delivery of Tatsuda to Japan was approved, he returned to Aden as a roundabout committee member and returned to Japan in March of the following year. He was promoted to Lieutenant Colonel. In the early days of the lieutenant colonelcy and colonelcy, he was assigned to the military administration of the Ministry of the Navy's chief and adjutant, but after December 1900, he served as a captain for the Matsushima, Yoshino, Chitose and Asama. He then participated in the Boxer Rebellion and received full honors for his service. In July 1903, he was supplemented as the captain of Shikishima before participating in the Russo-Japanese War.

== Russo-Japanese War ==
On February 4, 1904, Japan decided to go to war with Russia, and Tōgō Heihachirō, Commander-in-Chief of the Combined Fleet, gave the first Combined Fleet Order. The Shikishima approached Lushun as part of the 1st Fleet, and at 11:14 on February 9, the 1st Fleet fired on the Russian Pacific Squadron. In the battle, the Shikishima was hit by an attack from a land battery, but she continues to blockade Lushun and on May 15, an emergency occurs in the Japanese Navy battleship unit.

=== Loss of the Hatsuse and the Yashima ===
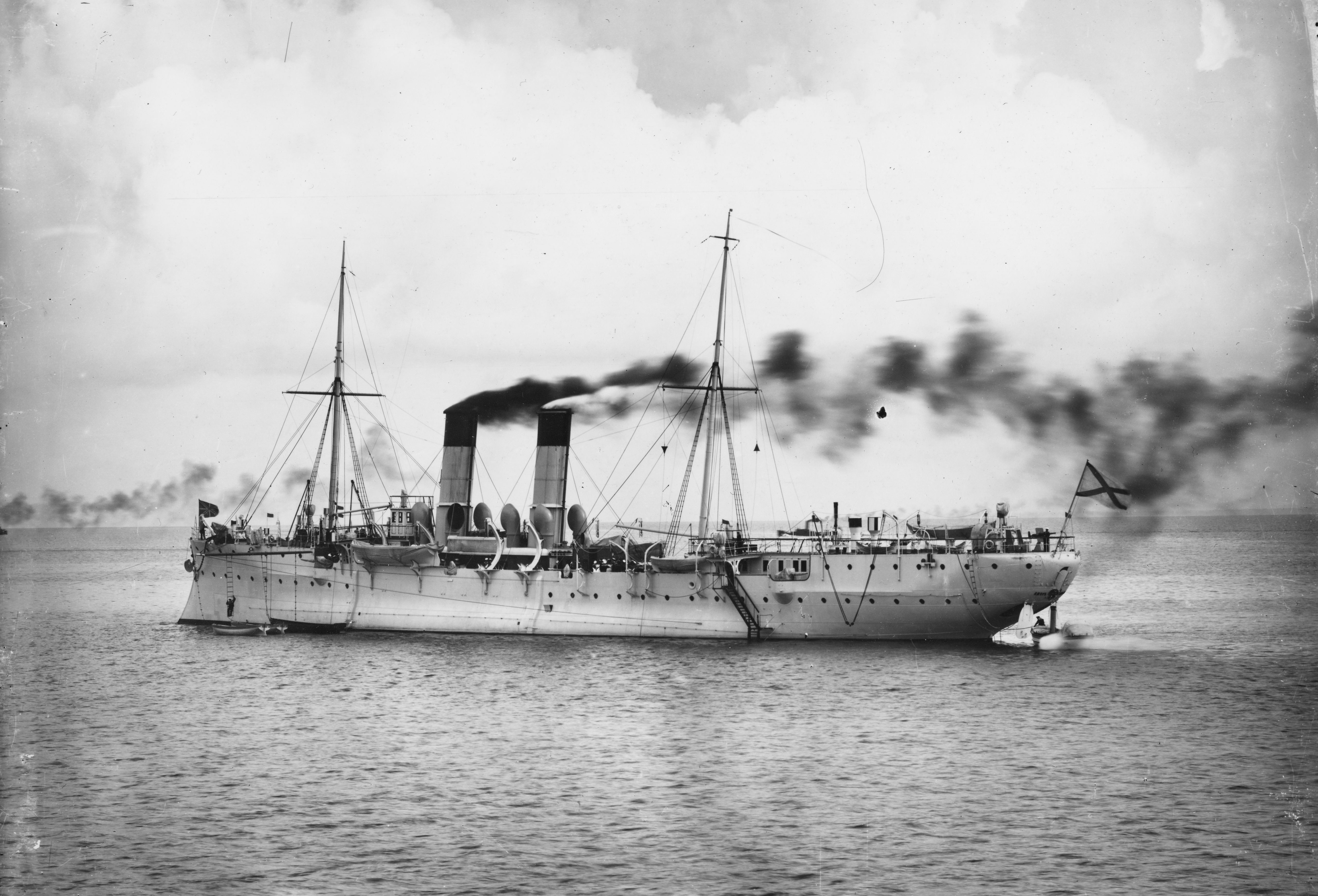
Amur at anchor which sunk the Hatsuse and Yashima were laid by the Amur in the middle of the night.

The battleships Hatsuse, Shikishima, Yashima, Tatsuta and Kasagi led by Maj. Gen. Nashiba Tokioki, were wary of the entrance to Lushun, but around 11:00 am, at the waters southeast, the Hatsuse was struck by a naval mine. Nashiba ordered his successor to change hands, but Yashima was subsequently struck by a mine. the Shikishima was the second ship located between the two ships. There were various opinions about the measures to be taken but Teragaki passed near the side of Hatsuse and withdrew. This measure by Teragaki was based on the judgment that "if there are mines, there are no two in the same place. The Combined Fleet lost 33% of its main force due to the sinking of Hatsuse and Yashima while the Russian Pacific Squadron was still alive and the Second Pacific Squadron expecting to arrive soon. In this dire situation, Teragaki shed tears without words at Mikasa who went to the report. In addition, one sailor of the Shikishima was killed in action.

=== Battle of the Yalu River ===
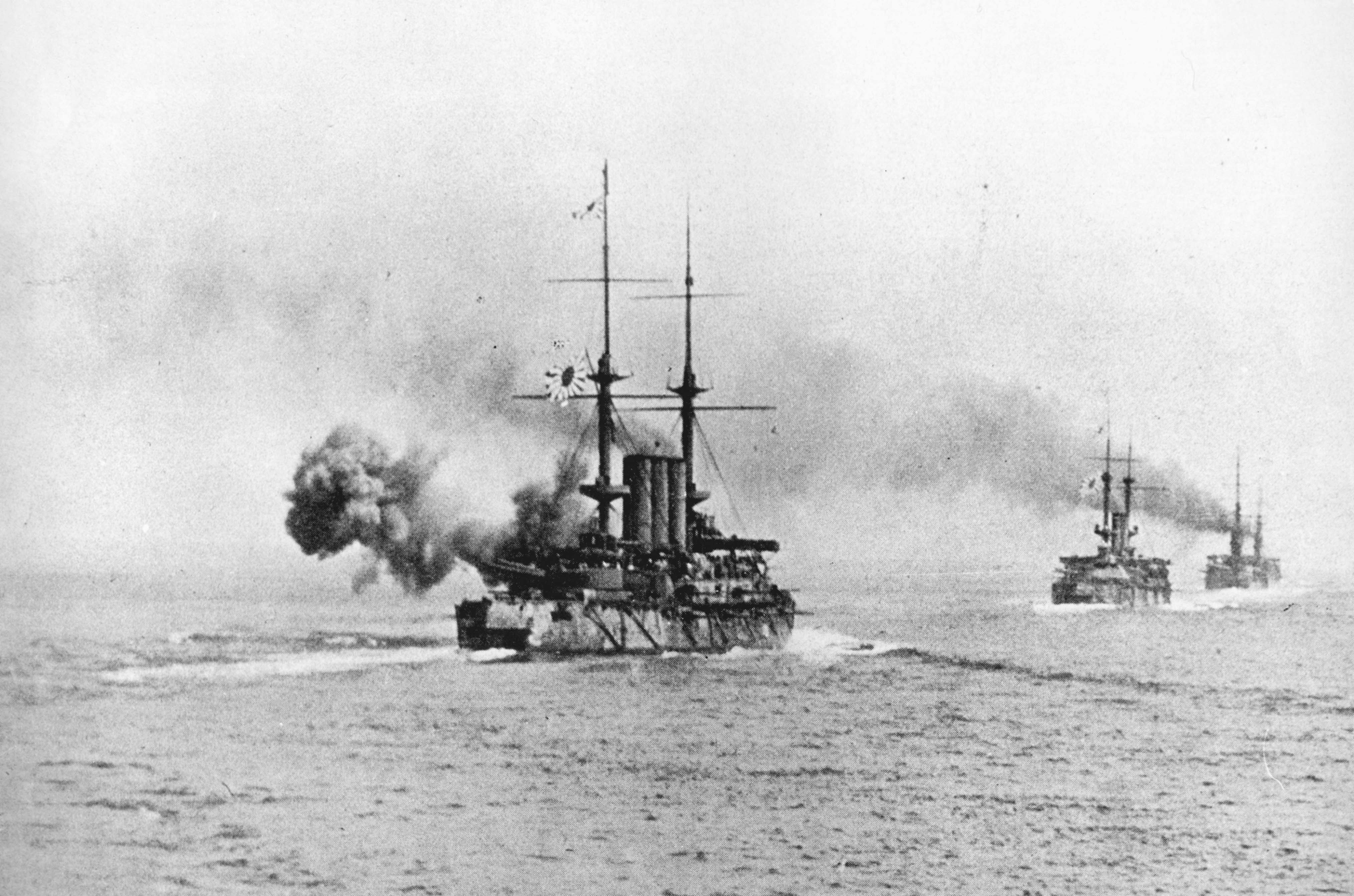
The First Squadron during the Battle of the Yellow Sea with the Shikishima, the Fuji, the Asahi and the Mikasa.

On August 10, the 1st Squadron, headed for the interception of the Lushun fleet led by Maj. Gen. Wilgelm Vitgeft, who set out in Lushun. The Japanese saw the Russians at 12:30, but decided that the Russian troops would return to Lushun and acted to cut off their retreat. However, the Russian destination was Vladivostok and the distance between the two units increased. The Japanese moved to chase and resumed firing at 17:30. The fleets of both countries continued to fire in parallel battles, but the sunset was approaching and there was not enough time left for the Japanese side to attack. However, at 18:37, a 12-inch shell from Mikasa hit the Russian flagship Tsesarevich and Vitgeft's officers were killed in action. The Russian Pacific Squadron fell into a state of turmoil, and its strength declined due to scuttling during the Battle of Korsakov and detention at a neutral port. Those who returned to Lushun lost their fighting ability due to the bombardment of the Third Fleet. The Navy Heavy Artillery Corps under the command of Lieutenant Colonel Eijiro Kuroi, Kazutoshi Hando and Kazushige Todaka found the weaknesses of "Crossing the T" in the battle and the strategy was abandoned by the Battle of Tsushima.

In the battle, the Shikishima was hit by a bullet in the rear admiral's office, but there were no casualties. The number of bullets fired at Shikishima is as follows.

List of shells fired by the Shikishima
Cannon Size	12 inches (30.05 cm)	6 inches (15.2 cm)	12 lbs (7.62 cm)	Total
Number of Cannons	4	14	20	38
Number of Shells	124	411	638	1173

=== Battle of Tsushima ===
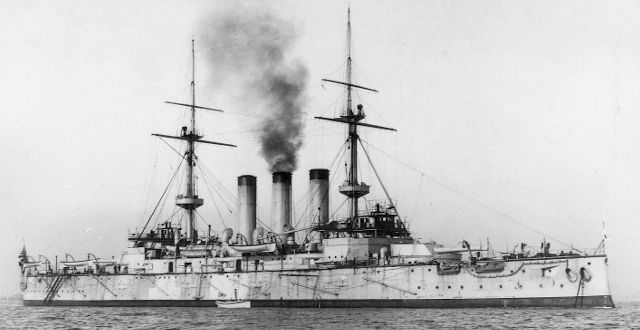
The Shikishima in 1905.

The Combined Fleet was undergoing maintenance, training daily at Jinhae Bay and waiting for the Second Pacific Squadron to arrive. There were four battleships that are the main force of the Japanese Navy. The main crew of Shikishima led by Teragaki consisted of Deputy Chief Engineer Nosuke Yamada, Rokuro Kamaya, Artillery Chief Nagatsune Ishikawa, and Atsuyuki Ide. Its engineering crew consisted of Chief Engineer Hanzo Kurahashi, Chief Engineer Kinjiro Nomura, and Chief Engineer Koichiro Kizu. In addition, Lieutenant Sankichi Takahashi and Ensign Ken Terajima joined the rest of the crew, arriving on May 27, 1905.

=== Combat in the Battle ===
Teragaki dumped the loaded coal, which hindered the bombardment, and cleaned the deck to prepare for battle. The Shikishima sorties as the second ship of the 1st Squadron and follows her flagship Mikasa to face the Second Pacific Squadron head-on. The Second Pacific Squadron flagship Knyaz Suvorov began firing at the end of the Shikishima. Shikishima began firing on the Oslyabya at a distance of 6800m at about the same time as Mikasa. The number of bullets fired at "Shikishima" after that was as follows. In addition, one torpedo was fired at 16:32 and 17:43, and Teragaki reported that both were hit.

List of shells fired by the Shikishima
Cannon Size	12 inches (30.05 cm)	6 inches (15.2 cm)	12 lbs (7.62 cm)	Total
Number of Cannons	4	14	20	38
Number of Shells	74	1372	1272	2718

The list of crew of Shikishima killed in action by Captain Seita Hiroshi and 13 others with an additional 24 injured. [20] The 1st Squadron didn't participate in the night battle of the day and headed for Ulleungdo.

The next day, he re-sorted and surrounded Russian troops led by Maj. Gen. Nikolai Nebogatov but Nebogatov surrendered and the Battle of Tsushima came to an end. Shikishima dispatched a captive under the command of Deputy Chief Yamada to the Imperator Nikolai I and Yamada et al. He made a round trip to Sasebo with the captive dispatched to Fuji.

== Later service ==
He was promoted to Rear Admiral in November 1908 while he was the chief of staff of the Yokosuka Naval District and served as commander of the fleet. He was engaged in security activities against the Chinese Nanyang Fleet and the Third Squadron was engaged in the protection of Japanese residents. His last office was the Takeshiki Guard District Commander. After being placed on the reserves list, Teragaki was involved in the establishment of the Navy Association and served as its director. He was also given a supporting role on January 28, 1917.

== Court Ranks ==
- Junior Seventh Rank (September 16, 1885)
- Seventh Rank (November 1, 1890)
- Junior Sixth Rank (January 23, 1895)
- Sixth Rank (March 8, 1898)
- Junior Fourth Rank (December 10, 1909)

== Awards ==
- Order of the Golden Kite, 3rd Class (April 1, 1906)
- Order of the Rising Sun, Grand Cordon with Golden Rays (April 1, 1906)
- 1904–05 Russo-Japanese War Medal (April 1, 1906)
- Memory of the Prince's visit to Korea Medal
- Memory of the Great Religion Medal
