= Yoshida Masujirō =

Japanese vice admiral (1867–1942)

- 吉田増次郎
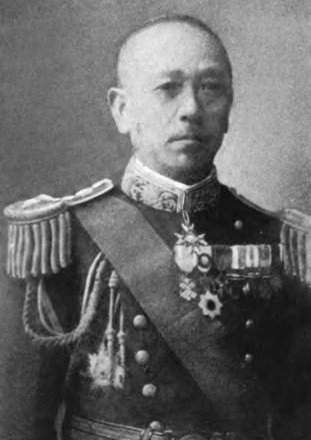
- Born: July 29, 1867; Shizuoka Prefecture, Japan
- Died: March 14, 1942 (aged 74)
- Military career
- Allegiance: Empire of Japan
- Branch: Imperial Japanese Navy
- Service years: 1890–1923
- Rank: Vice Admiral
- Conflicts: First Sino-Japanese War; Boxer Rebellion; Russo-Japanese War; World War I

Yoshida Masujirō (吉田増次郎; July 29, 1867 – March 14, 1942) was a Japanese admiral who was Commander of the Interim Southern Islands Defense Unit from 1916 to 1917.

== Biography ==
Yoshida was born in Shizuoka Prefecture and was a graduate of the 17th class of the Imperial Japanese Naval Academy in 1890. His classmates included Saneyuki Akiyama. He served as a sub-lieutenant on the corvette Yamato and cruiser Itsukushima during the First Sino-Japanese War and was appointed a division commander on the ironclad gunboat Chinpen at the end of the war. Promoted to lieutenant in April 1896, he was assigned to the cruiser Yoshino.

However, the following year, he was assigned to the naval intelligence section of the Imperial Japanese Navy General Staff, and as an intelligence officer was sent the guise of a naval attaché to Manila in 1898 at the time of the Battle of Manila Bay and departing immediately before the land Battle of Manila during the Spanish–American War. He then was assigned to China from 1898 to 1900, during the middle of the Boxer Rebellion.

Yoshida received his first command, that of the Chinpen, in June 1900. On October 1, 1901, he was promoted to lieutenant commander, and returned as an intelligence officer in China from 1902 to 1903. From 1903 through the end of the Russo-Japanese War he served as an intelligence officer in Seoul.

In February 1906, Yoshida was assigned as executive officer on the battleship Suwo. He was promoted to commander in 1906, and assigned as executive officer to the cruiser Matsushima, followed by Azuma in 1907. He was promoted to captain in January 1911. From January 1914 to February 1915, he served as an intelligence officer in China, which included the period of Japanese naval operations in China during the Siege of Tsingtao in World War I. From February to December 1916, he was captain of the cruiser Katori.

Yoshida was promoted to rear admiral on December 1, 1916, and was assigned as Commander of the Interim Southern Islands Defense Unit. Afterwards, he served as chief of the 3rd Section (Intelligence) of the Imperial Japanese Navy General Staff. He was promoted to vice admiral on December 1, 1920. He went on the reserve list on March 23, 1923, and retired on June 28, 1932. He died in 1942.

== Decorations ==
- 1918 – Order of the Sacred Treasure, 2nd class

Preceded by Kichitaro Togo	Commander of Interim Southern Islands Defense Unit; 1916–1917	Succeeded by Yasujiro Nagata
