= Tōgō Kichitarō =

Vice Admiral in the Imperial Japanese Navy

- 東郷 吉太郎
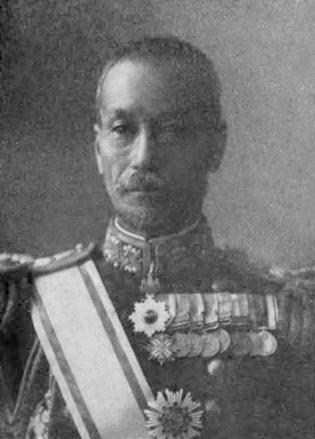
- Born: January 19, 1867; Satsuma Domain, Japan
- Died: October 26, 1942 (aged 75)
- Military career
- Allegiance: Empire of Japan
- Branch: Imperial Japanese Navy
- Service years: 1886–1931
- Rank: Vice Admiral
- Conflicts: First Sino-Japanese War; Russo-Japanese War; World War I

Tōgō Kichitarō (東郷 吉太郎; January 19, 1867 – October 26, 1942) was a Japanese admiral who was Commander of the Interim Southern Islands Defense Unit from 1915 to 1916.

== Biography ==
Tōgō was born in what is now Kagoshima Prefecture as the younger son of a samurai of Satsuma Domain. He was the nephew of Fleet Admiral Tōgō Heihachirō.

Tōgō was a graduate of the 13th class of the Imperial Japanese Naval Academy in 1886. At the start of the First Sino-Japanese War he was a lieutenant and division commander on the gunboat Ōshima, corvette Katsuragi, and by the end of the war served as gunnery officer on the cruisers Izumi and Matsushima. he was promoted to lieutenant commander in June 1898 and became chief gunnery officer on the battleship Fuji in March 1899. He was sent to Great Britain in August 1900 as part of the Japanese crew for the new battleship Hatsuse, returning in February 1901. He received his first command, that of the ex-Chinese gunboat Soko, in October 1901. He was promoted to commander in October 1902. From April to December 1903 he was assigned as aide-de-camp to Prince Higashifushimi Yorihito.

At the start of the Russo-Japanese War, Tōgō was assigned as executive officer on the cruiser Naniwa. After the end of the war, from January 1905, he was executive officer in the battleship Asahi and was given command of the cruiser Takao in December the same year. From February to September 1907 he was captain of the cruiser Izumi. Promoted to captain in September 1907. He was captain of the battleship Mishima to July 1908 and captain of the cruiser Kasagi from September to December of the same year. From September 1910 to December 1912, he was naval secretary for the Government-General of Taiwan.

Tōgō was then promoted to rear admiral on December 1, 1912 and served as commandant of the Naval Artillery School from December 3 to December 1914. During World War I, he served as Commander of the Interim Southern Islands Defense Unit from October 1915 to December 1916. He was promoted to vice admiral on December 1, 1916 and assigned command of the Chinkai Guard District to December 1918. He went on the reserve list on August 1, 1920 and retired on December 14, 1931. He died in 1942.

== Honors ==
- 1895 - Order of the Rising Sun, 6th class
- 1905 - Order of the Sacred Treasure, 4th class
- 1915 - Order of the Rising Sun, 2nd class
- 1920 - Order of the Sacred Treasure, 1st class

Preceded by Tatsuo Matsumura	Commander of Interim Southern Islands Defense Unit; 1915–1916	Succeeded by Masujiro Yoshida
