= Matsumura Tatsuo (admiral) =

- 松村 龍雄
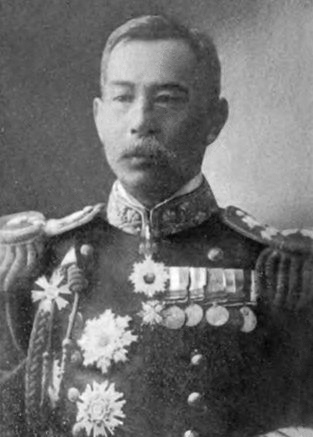
- Born: February 25, 1868; Tashiro, Hizen, Japan
- Died: July 18, 1932 (aged 64); Shirokane, Tokyo, Japan
- Military career
- Allegiance: Empire of Japan
- Branch: Imperial Japanese Navy
- Service years: 1887–1932
- Rank: Vice Admiral
- Conflicts: First Sino-Japanese War; Russo-Japanese War; World War I

Matsumura Tatsuo (松村 龍雄; February 25, 1868 – July 18, 1932) was a Japanese admiral who was Commander of the Interim Southern Islands Defense Unit from 1914 to 1915.

== Biography ==
Matsumura was born in what is now Saga Prefecture where his father was a samurai and lieutenant commander in the navy of Saga Domain. He was a graduate of the 14th class of the Imperial Japanese Naval Academy in 1887. One of his classmates was the future Prime Minister Suzuki Kantarō. He was commissioned as a lieutenant in December 1892, serving as navigator on the barque training ship Kanju and later the Banjō. During the First Sino-Japanese War, he served in staff positions and did not see combat, returning to sea after the end of the war as navigator on the ironclad Hiei in 1896. The following year, he graduated with honors from the first class of the Naval War College and was promoted to lieutenant commander. He was promoted to commander in October 1902. From July 1903.

At the start of the Russo-Japanese War, Matsumura was assigned as executive officer on the cruiser Azuma and from January 1905, was executive officer of the battleship Mikasa. Following the end of the war, from May 10, 1906, he was sent to the United Kingdom for studies, and was promoted to captain on September 28, 1907. He returned to Japan on May 23, 1908, becoming chief of staff of the IJN 2nd Fleet from November 20, 1908. From February 1, 1909, Matsumura was an instructor at the Naval College. On May 22, 1912, he received his first command, that of the battleship Aki. On December 1, 1912 he was promoted to rear admiral. Early during World War I, he served as Commander of the Interim Southern Islands Defense Unit from October 1914 to August 1915 and as commander of the Training Fleet from December 1915 to September 1916. He was promoted to vice admiral on December 1, 1916 and assigned command of the Mako Guard District to December 1917, and the Ryojun Guard District from December 1918 to October 1920. He went on the reserve list on April 1, 1922 and died in 1932.

== Honors ==
=== Japanese ===
- 1906 – Order of the Rising Sun, 3rd class
- 1906 – Order of the Golden Kite, 4th class
- 1915 – Order of the Rising Sun, 2nd class
- 1920 – Order of the Sacred Treasure, 1st class

=== Foreign ===
- 1920 – Romania: Grand Officer of the Star of Romania, with Swords

Preceded by None, area conquered from German New Guinea	Commanders of Interim Southern Islands Defense Unit; 1914–1915	Succeeded by Kichitaro Togo
