= Tsunejirō Ishii =

Vice Admiral Tsunejirō Ishii
- 石井 常次郎
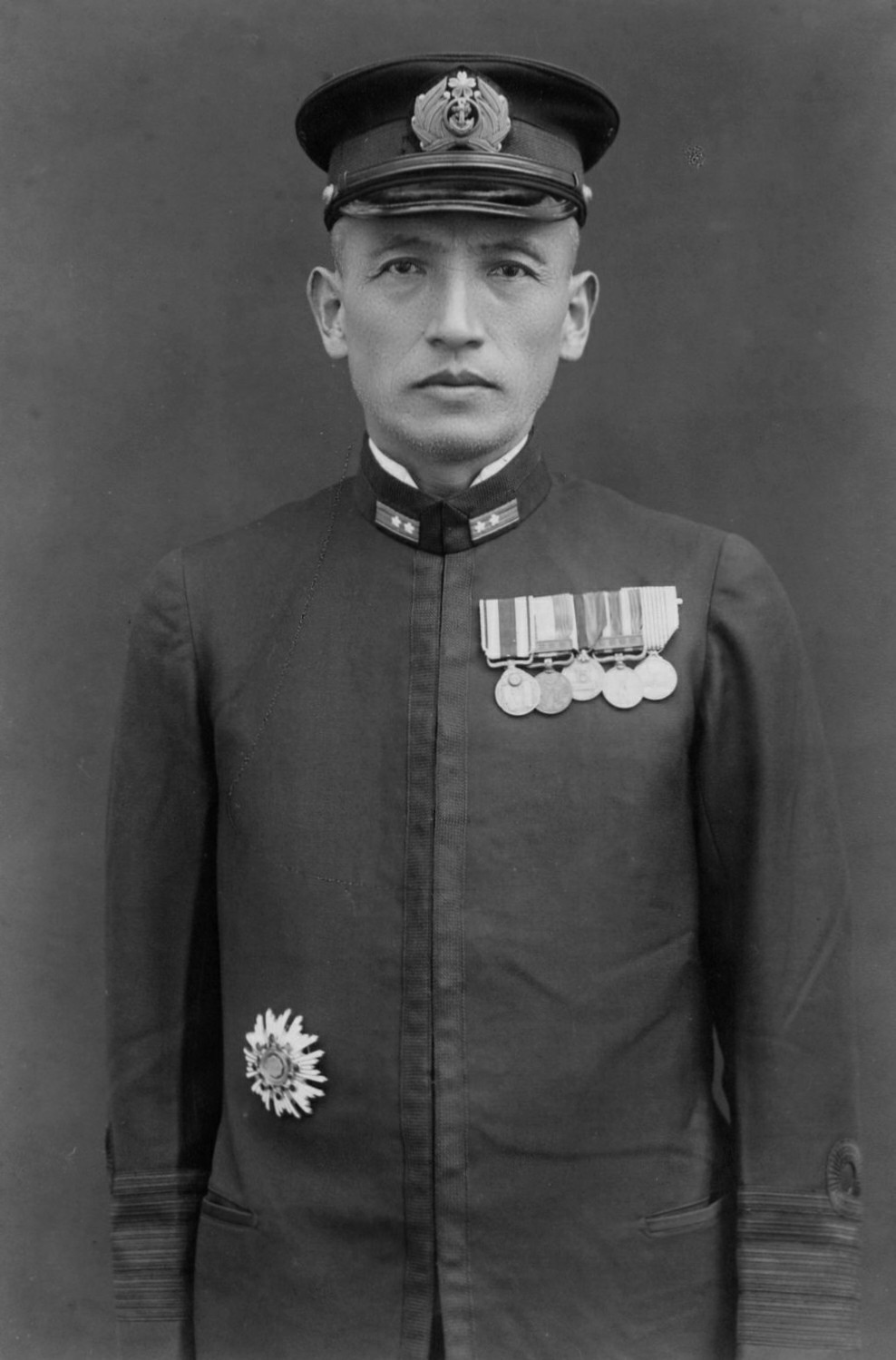
- Born: November 18, 1887; Osaka, Japan
- Died: January 16, 1951 (aged 63); Osaka, Japan
- Military career
- Allegiance: Empire of Japan
- Branch: Imperial Japanese Navy
- Service years: 1910–1941
- Rank: Vice Admiral
- Commands: Maizuru Naval Yards
- Awards: Order of the Sacred Treasures

Tsunejirō Ishii (石井 常次郎, Ishii Tsunejirō; 18 November 1887 – 16 January 1951) was an admiral in the Imperial Japanese Navy.

== Biography ==
=== Early life ===
A native of Osaka, Ishii graduated from the 18th class of the Imperial Japanese Naval Engineering Academy, placed 25th out of 66 cadets. As a midshipman, he was assigned to the cruiser Chitose, battleship Sagami and cruiser Kasuga in 1910. Promoted to lieutenant in 1914, he subsequently was assigned to the battleship Shikishima, followed by Settsu, where he served as chief engineer, but did not participate in any combat operations during World War I. In 1918, he was reassigned to Hyūga. Promoted to lieutenant commander in 1920 and commander in 1925, he supervised construction at the Maizuru Naval Arsenal.

In 1927, Ishii was ordered to the United States as a naval attaché. He entered through San Francisco on 27 July 1927. From there, he traveled to Chicago, Washington, D.C., and eventually settled in New York City for two years. He attended New York University until his order for return in 1929. He was promoted to captain in 1930, and to rear admiral in 1936, serving in various administrative posts. Having reached the rank of vice admiral on 15 November 1940, Ishii was made director of the Maizuru Navy Yards, overseeing ship construction.

=== World War II ===
Ishii spoke out strongly against the attack on Pearl Harbor and waging a war against the United States. Together with Admiral Isoroku Yamamoto, he viewed the attack on Pearl Harbor as the first step towards the "destruction of Japan". Ishii was well aware of the vast disparity in resources and industrial capacity between Japan and the United States, and his prophetic warnings on the war has been documented in several Japanese novels and documentaries.

Ishii was released from active duty in October 1941, and forced into retirement that same month. After the Japanese defeat in 1945, Ishii left his home in Osaka and went into hiding, fearing capture by SCAP authorities, who were rounding up many ex-military personnel and trying them for war crimes. He was later assured of his safety and returned to Osaka.

=== After the War ===
With his experience in the engineering field, Ishii became involved in many of the Japanese postwar industries. He contributed to the founding of Subaru Motors, and the revival of Ishikawajima Harima's shipbuilding division. Ishii died on 16 January 1951, in his home in Osaka at age 63.
