= Tei Monzen =

- 門前 鼎
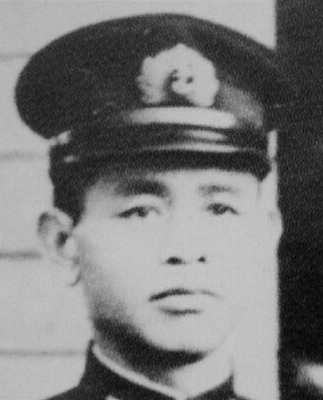
- Born: 15 April 1892; Fukui, Japan
- Died: 9 June 1944 (aged 52)
- Education: Etajima Naval Academy
- Military career
- Allegiance: Empire of Japan
- Branch: Imperial Japanese Navy
- Rank: Vice admiral
- Unit: Hyūga
- Commands: Atami, Ōtomari, Maizuru Submarine Base Unit
- Conflicts: World War II; Guadalcanal campaign

Tei Monzen (Note: K.Hidaka(日高孝次）June.1977 "Kaisōroku"（回想録)P308Meteorological Society of Japan『天気』（Tenki) Vol.24 No.6 writes his first name with Furigana as "Kanae"（かなえ）.) (門前 鼎, Monzen Tei; 15 April 1892 – 9 June 1944) was a captain in the Imperial Japanese Navy who was posthumously promoted to vice admiral.

== Biography ==
A native of Fukui, Monzen was born in 15 April 1892 and graduated from the Etajima Naval Academy, Class 42, on 12 December 1914.

On 10 March 1934, Commander Monzen was appointed commanding officer of the IJN river gunboat Atami.

On 15 December 1938, Captain Monzen (former executive officer of IJN battleship Hyūga) was appointed commanding officer of Ōtomari.

When 11,000 U.S. Marines came ashore at Guadalcanal on 7 August 1942 in Operation Watchtower, the 2,571 Japanese construction troops and 400 soldiers assigned to defend the area were under the command of Captain Tei Monzen.

”A remarkable amount of work had been done at the airfield in just one month. Japanese Navy Captain Tei Monzen, who was in charge of the project, was so pleased with the progress that he had ordered an extra, celebratory sake ration for the construction workers during the night of August 6, hours before the Marines landed.”

“The field was nearly finished. Repair shops, bomb sheds, a fine medical clinic, and a pagodalike administration building were ready; only a small middle section of the runway remained to be graded. Around the field a criss-cross of serviceable roads connected the positions of the 400-man force assigned to defend the base.

”It was time for a small celebration. On the evening of August 6, Monzen ordered an extra ration of sake for all hands, and it was announced that thanks to their industry and patriotism, planes would start landing in a few days.”

The landing of the Marines put paid to these expectations.

Monzen was assigned with the Maizuru Submarine Base Unit, 1 October 1943 - 20 May 1944.

He was killed in action 9 June 1944 with the 3rd Convoy HQ. His posthumous promotion to vice admiral was effective this date.

The Japanese Dōmei news agency reported on 22 September 1944 that he had “died in action” but gave no details.

The dispatch, recorded by a Federal Communications Commission monitor, said that the Yokosuka naval station, near Tokyo, had listed him as a fatality.
