= Tei Seki =

Imperial Japanese Navy admiral (1892–1982)

- 関 禎
- The 36th graduating class in the Etajima Naval Academy in November 1908
- Born: Chiba, Japan
- Died: January 31, 1944
- Education: Etajima Naval Academy
- Military career
- Allegiance: Empire of Japan
- Branch: Imperial Japanese Navy
- Rank: Rear admiral
- Unit: Yasukuni Maru
- Commands: Santo Maru; Tsukushi Maru
- Conflicts: World War II; Pacific War

Tei Seki (関 禎, Seki Tei; died January 31, 1944) was a rear admiral in the Imperial Japanese Navy during World War II.

== Biography ==
A native of Chiba, Seki graduated from the 36th class of Etajima Naval Academy on 21 November 1908.

After serving as commanding officer of Santo Maru, Captain-Ret Seki was posted as the Chief Equipping Officer of IJN submarine tender Tsukushi Maru on 15 January 1943.

Seki was killed in action on 31 January 1944 when converted submarine tender Yasukuni Maru was torpedoed. On 24 January 1944, Yasukuni Maru was assigned to a troop convoy departing Tateyama, Chiba for Truk. On 31 January, approximately 17 miles (27 km) northwest of Truk, the convoy was attacked by the US submarine Trigger and Yasukuni Maru was hit by two torpedoes. She took on water rapidly, and sank within five minutes at 09°15′N 147°13′E with loss of 300 crewmen and 888 technicians. Escorting destroyer Shiratsuyu recovered only 43 survivors. Captain Seki was amongst those lost.

The Japanese Dōmei news agency reported on 22 September 1944 that he had "died in action" but gave no details.

The dispatch, recorded by a Federal Communications Commission monitor, said that the Yokosuka naval station, near Tokyo, had listed him as a fatality.
