= Saneyoshi Yasuzumi =

Viscount Saneyoshi Yasuzumi
- 実吉 安純
- Born: March 20, 1848; Kagoshima Prefecture, Japan
- Died: March 1, 1932 (aged 83)
- Military career
- Allegiance: Empire of Japan
- Branch: Imperial Japanese Navy
- Service years: 1871–1915
- Rank: Vice Admiral

Viscount Saneyoshi Yasuzumi (実吉 安純; 20 March 1848 – 1 March 1932) was a pioneer of naval medicine in Meiji Era Japan and an admiral in the Imperial Japanese Navy.

== Biography ==
Saneyoshi was born in Satsuma domain (Kagoshima Prefecture). He entered the medical corps of the early Military Ministry of the Meiji government in 1871, and began work with the early Imperial Japanese Navy from 1872. He was given the rank of lieutenant in 1876, and promoted to lieutenant commander in 1878. From 19 July 1879 – 22 September 1885, he was sent to the United Kingdom to master the latest medical techniques, especially as pertaining to maritime-related medical issues.

After his return to Japan, Saneyoshi was promoted to commander and became an instructor at the Naval Medical Academy. He was promoted to captain in 1886, and became Director of the Naval Medical School from 1889–1891. In 1892, he was promoted to rear admiral.

Saneyoshi wrote a major treatise on naval medical techniques employed during the First Sino-Japanese War entitled The Surgical & Medical History of the Naval War between Japan & China during 1894–95. His book was translated into English, and a copy can be found at the Harvard University library.

On 9 May 1900, Saneyoshi was awarded the title of baron (danshaku) under the kazoku peerage system. Later in 1900, he traveled to Europe to study the latest medical techniques, visiting the United Kingdom, France, Germany, Austria and Russia.

After his return to Japan, Saneyoshi retired from active military service, and served from 1905–1907 as a member of the House of Peers. In September, his title was elevated to that of shishaku (viscount) for his contributions to the development of Japanese medicine.

Saneyoshi was promoted to vice admiral on 23 September 1919, as an honorary title four years after his official retirement from the reserves. Saneyoshi is regarded as one of the founders of Jikei University School of Medicine, a major medical school in Japan, serving as dean from 1920–1921. He died in 1932.
