= Japanese ship Suma =

Two warships of Japan have borne the name Suma :

- Japanese cruiser Suma, a Suma-class cruiser launched in 1895 and stricken in 1923
- Japanese gunboat Suma, an Insect-class gunboat launched in 1915 as HMS Moth and scuttled in 1941. Subsequently, refloated and renamed in 1942 she served in the Japanese Navy until her sinking in 1945.

== See also ==
- Suma-class cruiser, protected cruiser class of the Imperial Japanese Navy, whose lead ship was Suma
