= Japanese cruiser Iwate =

Japanese warship (1901–1945)

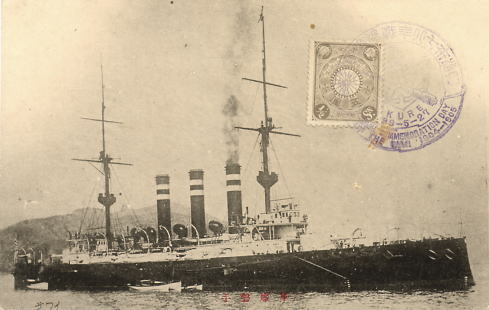
- A postcard of Iwate at anchor, 1905

History

Empire of Japan
- Name: Iwate
- Namesake: Mount Iwate
- Ordered: 19 July 1898
- Builder: Armstrong Whitworth, United Kingdom
- Laid down: 11 November 1898
- Launched: 29 March 1900
- Completed: 18 March 1901
- Reclassified: 1st-class coast-defense ship, 1 September 1921; 1st-class cruiser, 1 July 1942; As training ship, 1943
- Stricken: 30 November 1945
- Fate: Sunk by air attack, 25 July 1945; Raised and scrapped, 1946–1947

General characteristics
- Class & type: Izumo-class armored cruiser
- Displacement: 9,423 t (9,274 long tons)
- Length: 132.28 m (434 ft) (o/a)
- Beam: 20.94 m (68 ft 8 in)
- Draft: 7.21 m (23 ft 8 in)
- Installed power: 24 Belleville boilers; 14,500 ihp (10,800 kW)
- Propulsion: 2 Shafts; 2 triple-expansion steam engines
- Speed: 20.75 knots (38.43 km/h; 23.88 mph)
- Range: 7,000 nmi (13,000 km; 8,100 mi) at 10 knots (19 km/h; 12 mph)
- Complement: 672
- Armament: 2 × twin 8 in (203 mm) guns; 14 × single QF 6 in (152 mm) guns; 12 × single 12 pdr 3 in (76 mm) guns; 8 × single QF 2.5 pdr (1.5 in (38 mm)) Yamauchi guns; 4 × 18 in (457 mm) torpedo tubes
- Armor: Waterline belt: 89–178 mm (3.5–7.0 in); Deck: 63 mm (2.5 in); Gun turret: 160 mm (6.3 in); Barbette: 152 mm (6.0 in); Casemate: 51–152 mm (2.0–6.0 in); Conning tower: 356 mm (14.0 in); Bulkhead: 127 mm (5.0 in)

Iwate (磐手) was the second and last Izumo-class armored cruiser (Sōkō jun'yōkan) built for the Imperial Japanese Navy (IJN) in the late 1890s. As Japan lacked the industrial capacity to build such warships herself, the ship was built in Britain. She participated in most of the naval battles of the Russo-Japanese War of 1904–1905. The ship was moderately damaged during the Battle of Port Arthur, the Battle off Ulsan, and the Battle of Tsushima. Iwate played a minor role in World War I and began the first of her many training cruises for naval cadets in 1916, a task that would last until the end of 1939. The ship continued to conduct training in home waters throughout the Pacific War. Iwate was sunk by American carrier aircraft during the attack on Kure in July 1945. Her wreck was refloated and scrapped in 1946–1947.

== Background and description ==
The 1896 Naval Expansion Plan was made after the First Sino-Japanese War and included four armored cruisers in addition to four more battleships, all of which had to be ordered from British shipyards as Japan lacked the capability to build them itself. Further consideration of the Russian building program caused the IJN to believe that the battleships ordered under the original plan would not be sufficient to counter the Imperial Russian Navy. Budgetary limitations prevented ordering more battleships and the IJN decided to expand the number of more affordable armored cruisers to be ordered from four to six ships. The revised plan is commonly known as the "Six-Six Fleet". Unlike most of their contemporaries which were designed for commerce raiding or to defend colonies and trade routes, Iwate and her half-sisters were intended as fleet scouts and to be employed in the battleline.

The ship was 132.28 meters (434 ft) long overall and 121.92 meters (400 ft) between perpendiculars. She had a beam of 20.94 meters (68 ft 8 in) and had an average draft of 7.21 meters (23 ft 8 in). Iwate displaced 9,423 metric tons (9,274 long tons) at normal load and 10,235 metric tons (10,073 long tons) at deep load. The ship had a metacentric height of 0.73 meters (2 ft 5 in). Her crew consisted of 672 officers and enlisted men.

Iwate had a pair of four-cylinder triple-expansion steam engines, each driving a single propeller shaft. Steam for the engines was provided by 24 Belleville boilers and the engines were rated at a total of 14,500 indicated horsepower (10,800 kW). The ship had a designed speed of 20.75 knots (38.43 km/h; 23.88 mph) and reached 22.3 knots (41.3 km/h; 25.7 mph) during her sea trials from 15,739 ihp (11,737 kW). She carried up to 1,527 long tons (1,551 t) of coal and could steam for 7,000 nautical miles (13,000 km; 8,100 mi) at a speed of 10 knots (19 km/h; 12 mph).

The main armament for all of the "Six-Six Fleet" armored cruisers consisted of four 8-inch (203 mm) guns in twin-gun turrets fore and aft of the superstructure. The secondary armament consisted of 14 Elswick Ordnance Company "Pattern Z" quick-firing (QF), 6-inch (152 mm) guns. Only four of these guns were not mounted in armored casemates on the main and upper decks and their mounts on the upper deck were protected by gun shields. Iwate was also equipped with a dozen QF 12-pounder (3-inch (76 mm)) 12-cwt guns (Note: "Cwt" is the abbreviation for hundredweight, 12 cwt referring to the weight of the gun.) and eight QF 2.5-pounder (1.5-inch (38 mm)) Yamauchi guns as close-range defense against torpedo boats. The ship was equipped with four submerged 18-inch (457 mm) torpedo tubes, two on each broadside.

All of the "Six-Six Fleet" armored cruisers used the same armor scheme with some minor differences. The waterline belt of Krupp cemented armor ran the full length of the ship and its thickness varied from 178 millimeters (7.0 in) amidships to 89 millimeters (3.5 in) at the bow and stern. It had a height of 2.13 meters (7 ft 0 in), of which 1.33 meters (4 ft 4 in) was normally underwater. The upper strake of belt armor was 127 millimeters (5.0 in) thick and extended from the upper edge of the waterline belt to the main deck. It extended 53.31 meters (174 ft 11 in) from the forward to the rear barbette. The Izumo class had oblique 127 mm armored bulkheads that closed off the ends of the central armored citadel.

The barbettes, gun turrets and the front of the casemates were all 6 inches thick while the sides and rear of the casemates were protected by 51 millimeters (2.0 in) of armor. The deck was 63 millimeters (2.5 in) thick and the armor protecting the conning tower was 356 millimeters (14.0 in) in thickness.

== Construction and career ==
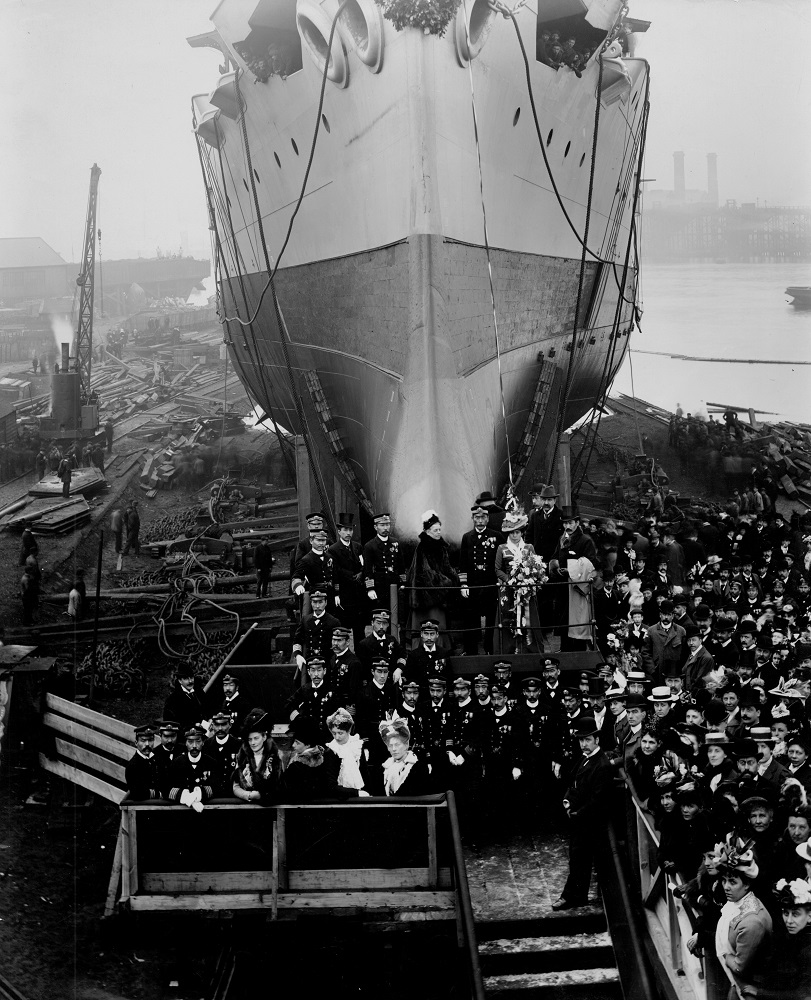
Iwate prior to launching, Newcastle upon Tyne

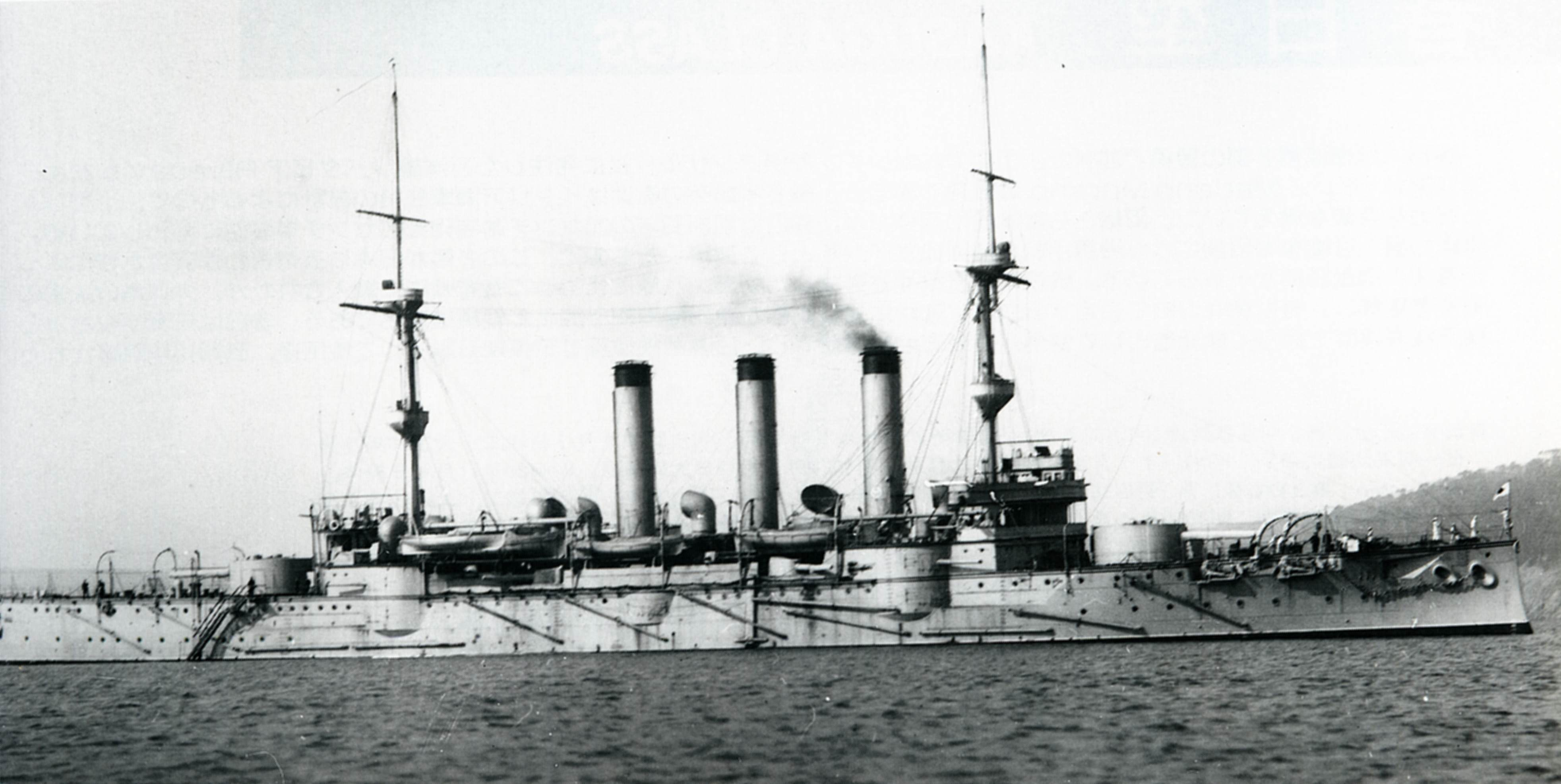
Iwate at anchor, Plymouth, c. 1901

The contract for Iwate, named after the eponymous prefecture, was signed on 19 July 1898 with Armstrong Whitworth. The ship was laid down at their shipyard in Elswick on 11 November 1898 and launched on 29 March 1900, when she was named by Mme. Arakawa, wife of the Japanese Consul-General in London. She was completed on 18 March 1901 and departed for Japan the following day under the command of Captain Hikohachi Yamada, who had been appointed to supervise her construction and bring her back to Japan. Iwate arrived in Yokosuka on 17 May and Yamada was relieved by Captain Taketomi Kunikane on 6 July.

=== Russo-Japanese War ===
At the start of the Russo-Japanese War, Iwate was the flagship of Rear Admiral Misu Sotarō, commander of the 2nd Division of the 2nd Fleet. She participated in the Battle of Port Arthur on 9 February 1904, when Vice Admiral Tōgō Heihachirō led the Combined Fleet in an attack on the Russian ships of the Pacific Squadron anchored just outside Port Arthur. Tōgō had expected the surprise night attack by his destroyers to be much more successful than it was, anticipating that the Russians would be badly disorganized and weakened, but they had recovered from their surprise and were ready for his attack. The Japanese ships were spotted by the protected cruiser Boyarin, which was patrolling offshore and alerted the Russians. Tōgō chose to attack the Russian coastal defenses with his main armament and engage the ships with his secondary guns. Splitting his fire proved to be a poor decision as the Japanese eight- and six-inch guns inflicted little damage on the Russian ships, which concentrated all their fire on the Japanese ships with some effect. Although many ships on both sides were hit, Russian casualties numbered some 150, while the Japanese suffered roughly 90 killed and wounded before Tōgō disengaged. Iwate had, in fact, been considerably damaged in the engagement.

In early March, Kamimura was tasked to take the reinforced 2nd Division north and make a diversion off Vladivostok. While scouting for Russian ships in the area, the Japanese cruisers bombarded the harbor and defenses of Vladivostok on 6 March to little effect. Upon their return to Japan a few days later, the 2nd Division was ordered to escort the transports ferrying the Imperial Guards Division to Korea and then to join the ships blockading Port Arthur. Kamimura was ordered north in mid-April to cover the Sea of Japan and defend the Korea Strait against any attempt by the Vladivostok Independent Cruiser Squadron, under the command of Rear Admiral Karl Jessen, to break through and unite with the Pacific Squadron. The two units narrowly missed each other on the 24th in heavy fog and the Japanese proceeded to Vladivostok where they laid several minefields before arriving back at Wonsan on the 30th.

The division failed to intercept the Russian squadron as it attacked several transports south of Okinoshima Island on 15 June due to heavy rain and fog. The Russians sortied again on 30 June and Kamimura finally was able to intercept them the next day near Okinoshima. The light was failing when they were spotted and the Russians were able to disengage in the darkness. Jessen's ships sortied again on 17 July headed for the eastern coast of Japan to act as a diversion and pull Japanese forces out of the Sea of Japan and the Yellow Sea. The Russian ships passed through Tsugaru Strait two days later and began capturing ships bound for Japan. The arrival of the Russians off Tokyo Bay on the 24th caused the Naval General Staff to order Kamimura to sail for Cape Toi Misaki, Kyūshū, fearing that Jessen would circumnavigate Japan to reach Port Arthur. Two days later he was ordered north to the Kii Channel and then to Tokyo Bay on the 28th. The General Staff finally ordered him back to Tsushima Island on the 30th; later that day he received word that Jessen's ships had passed through the Tsugaru Strait early that morning and reached Vladivostok on 1 August.

==== Battle off Ulsan ====
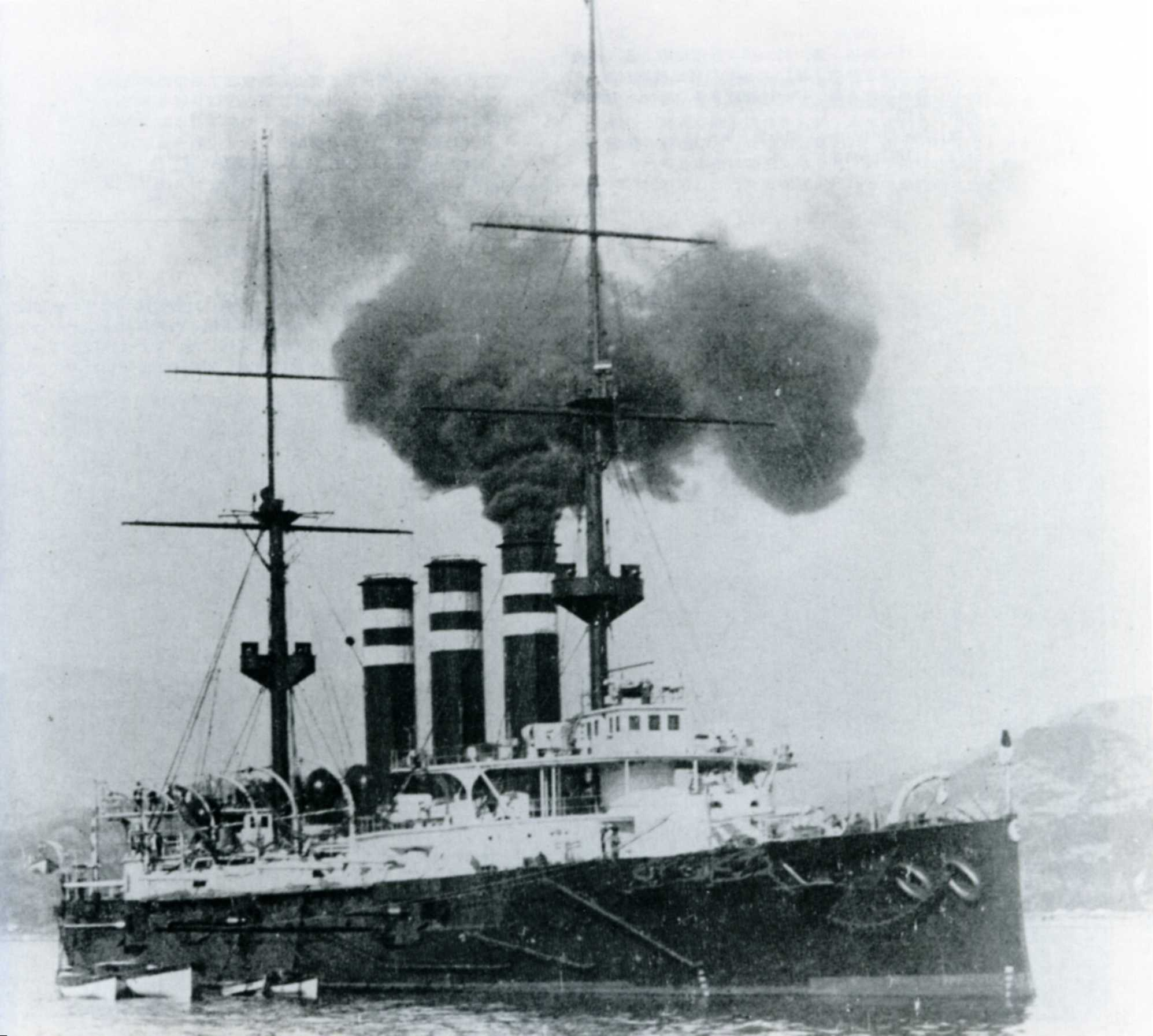
Iwate at anchor, 1902

On 10 August, the ships at Port Arthur attempted a breakout to Vladivostok, but were turned back in the Battle of the Yellow Sea. Jessen was ordered to rendezvous with them, but the order was delayed. His three armored cruisers, Rossia, Gromoboi, and Rurik, had to raise steam, so he did not sortie until the evening of 13 August. By dawn he had reached Tsushima, but turned back when he failed to see any ships from the Port Arthur squadron. 36 miles (58 km) north of the island he encountered Kamimura's squadron, which consisted of four modern armored cruisers, Izumo, Tokiwa, Azuma, and Iwate. The two squadrons had passed during the night without spotting one another and each had reversed course around first light. This put the Japanese ships astride the Russian route to Vladivostok.

Jessen ordered his ships to turn to the northeast when he spotted the Japanese at 05:00 and they followed suit, albeit on a slightly converging course. Both sides opened fire around 05:23 at a range of 8,500 meters (9,300 yd). The Japanese ships concentrated their fire on Rurik, the rear ship of the Russian formation. She was hit fairly quickly and began to fall astern of the other two ships. Jessen turned southeast in an attempt to open the range, but this blinded the Russian gunners with the rising sun and prevented any of their broadside guns from bearing on the Japanese. About 06:00, Jessen turned 180° to starboard in an attempt to reach the Korean coast and to allow Rurik to rejoin the squadron. Kamimura followed suit around 06:10, but turned to port, which opened the range between the squadrons. Azuma then developed engine problems and the Japanese squadron slowed to conform with her best speed. Firing recommenced at 06:24 and Rurik was hit three times in the stern, flooding her steering compartment; she had to be steered with her engines. Her speed continued to decrease, further exposing her to Japanese fire, and her steering jammed to port around 06:40.

Jessen made another 180° turn in an attempt to interpose his two ships between the Japanese and Rurik, but the latter ship suddenly turn to starboard and increased speed and passed between Jessen's ships and the Japanese. Kamimura turned 180° as well so that both squadrons were heading southeast on parallel courses, but Jessen quickly made another 180° turn so that they headed on opposing courses. At this time an eight-inch shell struck the roof of Iwate's starboard forward upper six-inch casemate and ignited the ready-use ammunition. The fire killed 40 and wounded 24 more and knocked out the six-inch gun in that casemate, as well as those below and aft of it. In addition, the 12-pounder above it was rendered inoperable. The Russians reversed course for the third time around 07:45 in another attempt to support Rurik although Rossia was on fire herself; her fires were extinguished about twenty minutes later. Kamimura circled Rurik to the south at 08:00 and allowed the other two Russian ships to get to his north and gave them an uncontested route to Vladivostok. Despite this, Jessen turned back once more at 08:15 and ordered Rurik to make her own way back to Vladivostok before turning north at his maximum speed, about 18 knots (33 km/h; 21 mph).

About this time Kamimura's two elderly protected cruisers, Naniwa and Takachiho, were approaching from the south. Their arrival allowed Kamimura to pursue Jessen with all of his armored cruisers while the two new arrivals dealt with Rurik. They fought a running battle with the Russians for the next hour and a half; scoring enough hits on them to force their speed down to 15 knots (28 km/h; 17 mph). The Japanese closed to a minimum of about 5,000 meters (5,500 yd), but Kamimura then opened the range up to 6,500 meters (7,100 yd).

About 10:00, Kamimura's gunnery officer erroneously informed him that Izumo had expended three-quarters of her ammunition and he turned back after a five-minute rapid-fire barrage. He did not wish to leave the Tsushima Strait unguarded and thought that he could use his remaining ammunition on Rurik. By this time she had been sunk by Naniwa and Takachiho. They had radioed Kamimura that she was sunk, but he did not receive the message. Shortly after the Japanese turned back, Gromoboi and Rossia were forced to heave-to to make repairs. Iwate was the most seriously damaged Japanese ship and suffered a total of 40 killed and 37 wounded.

In mid-September, Tokiwa and Iwate were transferred to the 1st Division. In early December the cruiser was sent home to refit. In mid-February, she was guarding the Tsugaru Strait and remained there through mid-April.

==== Battle of Tsushima ====
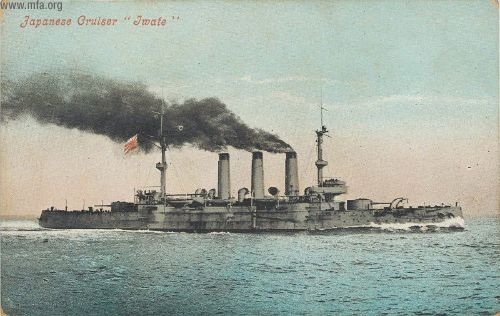
A Japanese postcard of Iwate at sea, c. 1905

As the Russian 2nd and 3rd Pacific Squadrons approached Japan on 27 May, having sailed from the Baltic Sea, they were spotted by patrolling Japanese ships early that morning, but visibility was limited and radio reception poor. The preliminary reports were enough to cause Tōgō to order his ships to put to sea and the 2nd Division spotted the Russian ships under the command of Vice Admiral Zinovy Rozhestvensky at around 11:30. Kamimura closed to about a range of 8,000 meters (8,700 yd) before sheering off under fire to join Tōgō's battleships. Iwate, now the flagship of Rear Admiral Shimamura Hayao, was last in the 2nd Division when Tōgō opened fire on the 2nd Pacific Squadron at 14:10 and, like most of the ships in the division, engaged the battleship Oslyabya which was forced to fall out of formation at 14:50 and sank 20 minutes later. The cruiser also fired upon the battleship Imperator Nikolai I before 14:50. The protected cruiser Zhemchug attempted to make a torpedo attack at about 15:06, but was driven off by fire from Iwate and the armored cruisers Kasuga and Nisshin. The battleship Knyaz Suvorov suddenly appeared out of the mist at 15:35 at a range of about 2,000 meters (6,600 ft). All of Kamimura's ships engaged her for five minutes or so with Azuma and the armored cruiser Yakumo also firing torpedoes at the Russian ship without effect.

After 17:30 Kamimura led his division in a fruitless pursuit of some of the Russian cruisers, leaving Tōgō's battleships to their own devices. He abandoned his chase around 18:03 and turned northwards to rejoin Tōgō. His ships spotted the rear of the Russian battleline around 18:30 and opened fire when the range closed to 8000–9000 meters. Nothing is known of any effect on the Russians and they ceased fire by 19:30 and rejoined Tōgō at 20:08 as night was falling. The surviving Russian ships were spotted the next morning and the Japanese ships opened fire around 10:30, staying beyond the range at which the Russian ships could effectively reply. Rear Admiral Nikolai Nebogatov therefore decided to surrender his ships as he could neither return fire nor close the range.

In the meantime, the coast defense ship Admiral Ushakov had fallen well behind Nebogatov's ships and was spotted by the protected cruiser Chiyoda early in the morning, but the Japanese were more intent on locating the main body of the Russian fleet than attacking a single isolated ship. Admiral Ushakov was then spotted at 14:10, well after Nebogatov's surrender, by Shimamura who received permission to pursue her with Iwate and Yakumo. They caught up with the Russian ship at 17:00 and demanded her surrender. Admiral Ushakov attempted to close the range to bring the Japanese cruisers within range of her guns, but they were fast enough to keep the range open and the Russian ship never hit either one. After about half an hour, Admiral Ushakov was listing heavily enough that her guns could not elevate enough to bear and her commander ordered his crew to abandon ship and the scuttling charges detonated. The ship sank in three minutes and 12 officers and 327 crewmen were rescued by the Japanese. Between them, Yakumo and Iwate fired 89 eight- and 278 six-inch shells during the engagement. Iwate was struck 17 times, over the course of the entire battle, including hits that burst in the water alongside. She was, however, only lightly damaged by two hits that caused two compartments on the lower deck to flood. These hits were made by two 12-inch, three 8-inch, two 6-inch, one 120 mm (4.7 in), five 75 mm (3 in), and four unidentified shells.

As the IJN was preparing to invade Sakhalin Island in early July, Kamimura's 2nd Division, now reduced to Iwate, Izumo, and Tokiwa, was tasked to defend the Korea Strait before it escorted troops that made an amphibious landing in northeastern Korea. In mid-August, the division covered the landing at Chongjin, closer to the Russian border. After the war, she was briefly commanded by Captain Yamashita Gentarō from 2 February to 22 November 1906 before he was relieved by Captain Arima Ryokitsu.

=== Subsequent service ===
The ship participated in the early stages of the Battle of Tsingtao before returning to Sasebo on 2 October 1914. The following month she was assigned to the First South Seas Squadron, based at Fiji and later at the Marquesas Islands. On 1 September 1915, Iwate was assigned to the Training Squadron where she conducted long-distance oceanic navigation and officer training for cadets in the Imperial Japanese Navy Academy. She began the first of her 16 training cruises on 20 April 1916, together with Azuma, and visited Australia and Southeast Asia before returning home on 22 August. The ship was relieved of her assignment the next month, but rejoined the Training Squadron a year later in preparation for her next training cruise. Iwate departed on 2 March 1918, bound for Central America, Hawaii and the South Sea Islands, and returned on 6 July.

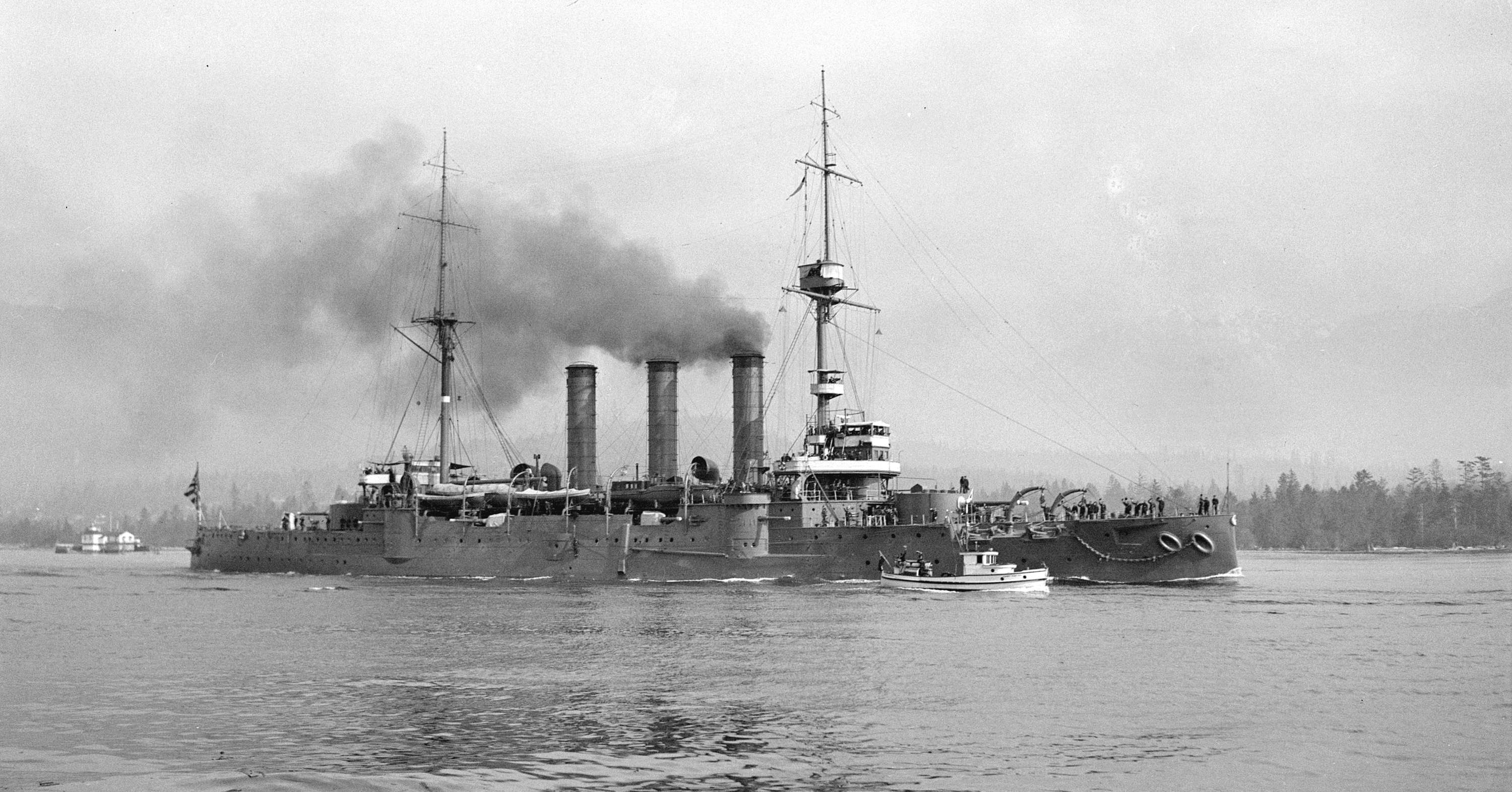
Iwate at Vancouver, British Columbia, Canada, 1933

Two years later, the ship began her next training cruise on 21 August 1920, visiting South America and the South Sea Islands, before returning on 4 April 1921. On 1 September, she was re-designated as a 1st-class coast-defense ship. On 26 June 1922, Iwate, accompanied by Izumo and Yakumo, began a circumnavigation of the world that took them to Hawaii, Los Angeles, California, through the Panama Canal to Rio de Janeiro, where the cadets viewed the Independence Centenary International Exposition commemorating Brazilian independence. The ships then visited Buenos Aires, Argentina and Durban, South Africa before heading home via the Indian Ocean, where they arrived on 8 February 1923.

In 1924, four of Iwate's 12-pounder guns were removed, as were all of her QF 2.5-pounder guns, and a single 8 cm/40 3rd Year Type anti-aircraft (AA) gun was added. Refitted again in 1931, her torpedo tubes were removed as were all of her main deck 6-inch guns and their casemates plated over; she now carried only two 12-pounders, although she now had three 8 cm/40 3rd Year Type AA guns. In addition her boilers were replaced by six Yarrow boilers with an output of only 7,000 ihp (5,200 kW) which reduced her top speed to 16 knots (30 km/h; 18 mph). She now carried 1,435 metric tons (1,412 long tons) of coal and 329 metric tons (324 long tons) of fuel oil. Her crew now numbered 726 officers and enlisted men.

The ship continued to make training cruises, usually at two-year intervals, for the rest of the decade that took her to the East Coast of North America and the Mediterranean Sea among other places. One of her cadets on the 1925–26 cruise was Prince Hironobu Fushimi. In December 1928, the ship escorted Emperor Hirohito during an Imperial fleet review in Yokohama harbor. From 1932 the training voyages became annual events, with the exception of 1935, until they ceased at the end of 1939.

Iwate was assigned to the 12th Squadron of the 3rd Support Fleet from 1 February 1940. Despite her antiquated age, she was briefly re-classified as a 1st-class cruiser on 1 July 1942 before she was reclassified as a training ship in 1943. On 19 March 1945, Iwate was attacked by American carrier aircraft, killing one crewman, although they failed to inflict any significant damage. Shortly afterwards, her 8-inch guns were replaced by four 12.7 cm (5.0 in) Type 89 dual-purpose guns in two twin mounts and four of her remaining 6-inch guns were removed. Her light anti-aircraft armament was significantly reinforced by the addition of nine license-built Hotchkiss 25-millimeter Type 96 light AA guns in one triple, two twin, and two single-gun mounts and two 13.2-millimeter Hotchkiss machine guns in single mounts.

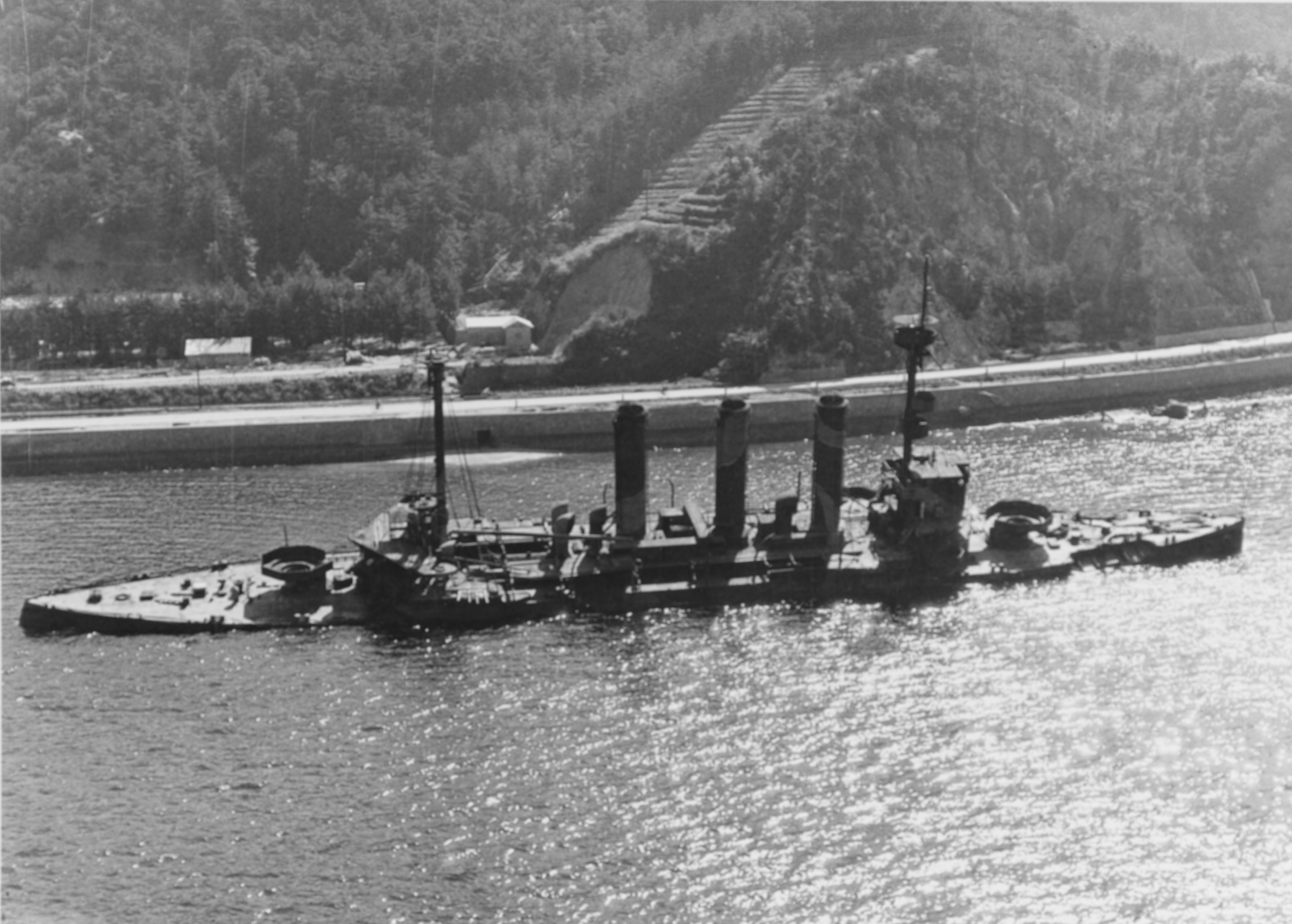
Iwate sunk off Kure, October 1945

The ship was bombed during the American aerial attack on Kure on 24 July 1945. While not hit by any bombs, the three near misses sprang the ship's seams and the resulting flooding caused her to sink in shallow water at coordinates 34°14′N 132°30′E the following day. She was removed from the navy list on 30 November and her hulk was raised and scrapped in 1946–47 by the Harima Dock Company.
