= Hikohachi Yamada =

Japanese admiral (1855–1942)

- 山田 彦八
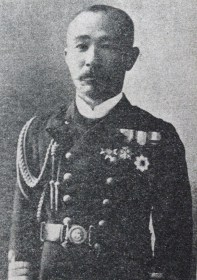
- Born: April 15, 1855; Kagoshima Castle, Satsuma, Japan
- Died: January 28, 1942 (aged 86); Location Unknown
- Burial place: Aoyama Cemetery, Minato, Tokyo, Japan
- Education: Imperial Japanese Naval Academy
- Military career
- Allegiance: Japan
- Branch: Imperial Japanese Navy
- Service years: 1871 – 1915
- Rank: Vice Admiral
- Commands: Seventh Division of the Third Fleet
- Conflicts: Satsuma Rebellion; First Sino-Japanese War; Russo-Japanese War; Battle of the Yellow Sea; Battle of Tsushima

Hikohachi Yamada (山田 彦八, Yamada Hikohachi; April 15, 1855 – January 28, 1942) was a Japanese Vice Admiral of the First Sino-Japanese War and the Russo-Japanese War. He was known for being the commander of the Seventh Division of the Third Fleet during the Battle of the Yellow Sea and the Battle of Tsushima.

== Biography ==
Hikohachi was born on April 15, 1855, at the Kagoshima Castle within the Satsuma Province. His father was Aritsune Yamada who was a feudal retainer of the Satsuma Domain while his mother, Suma, was the younger sister of Toshimichi Ōkubo and his brothers were Naoya Yamada and Sanjiro Yamada. Under the advice of his uncle Toshimichi Ōkubo, he moved to Tokyo and enrolled in the Imperial Japanese Naval Academy in 1871. During his education, he took part in the Satsuma Rebellion as part of the crew of the Asama. He graduated in July 1878 as part of its 5th Class and made an ensign in January 1881. Beginning in October 1884, he became a squad leader of the Kongō and became a member of the 2nd Naval Division of the Imperial Japanese Navy General Staff, being given command of the Naniwa, the Tsukuba and the Itsukushima and by December 1891, he was promoted to Lieutenant Commander.

In June 1892, he served as a member of the 3rd Section of the Naval General Staff Department and served as a staff officer of the Kure Naval District. During the First Sino-Japanese War, Yamada was the deputy commander of the Yoshino. In December 1895, he assumed command of the Amagi and after serving as a commander of the Tenryū and commander of the Kaiheidan and in June 1897, he was promoted to captain and became the commander of the Kaiheidan. In May 1898, he became the captain of the Suma, served as chairman of the Iwate during a business trip to the United Kingdom and was transferred to the Sasebo Naval District in November 1903 until he was ordered to participate in the Russo-Japanese War. In June 1904, he was promoted to Rear Admiral and became Commander of the Third Fleet and participated in the Battle of the Yellow Sea and given command of the 7th Division during the Battle of Tsushima.

In December 1905, he was transferred to the command of the 1st Fleet and after serving as the commander of the Sasebo Torpedo Command and the Kure Torpedo Command> He was then promoted to Vice Admiral in August 1908 and was appointed Commander of the 1st Fleet. Since then, he has served as commander-in-chief of the Takeshiki Guard District and served as the commander-in-chief of the Ryojun Guard District. He served as the commander-in-chief of the Yokosuka Naval District and a member of the Naval Officers' Council. In March 1915, he was transferred to the reserves.

== Court Ranks ==
- Junior Seventh Rank (December 25, 1883)
- Senior Seventh Rank (November 27, 1886)
- Junior Sixth Rank (March 23, 1892)
- Senior Fifth Rank (April 20, 1903)
- Junior Fourth Rank (May 11, 1908)
- Senior Fourth Rank (May 21, 1910)
- Junior Third Rank (May 30, 1913)
- Senior Third Rank (March 20, 1915)

== Awards ==
- Order of the Sacred Treasure, 5th Class (November 24, 1894)
- Order of the Rising Sun, 5th Class (September 27, 1895)
- Order of the Golden Kite, 4th Class (September 27, 1895)
- Order of the Sacred Treasure, 4th Class (May 9, 1899)
- Order of the Sacred Treasure, 3rd Class (May 30, 1905)
- Order of the Rising Sun, 3rd Class (April 1, 1906)
- Order of the Rising Sun, 2nd Class (April 1, 1906)
- 1904–05 Russo-Japanese War Medal (April 1, 1906)
- Order of the Sacred Treasure, 1st Class (May 24, 1912)
- Tairei Commemorative Badge (November 10, 1915)

=== Foreign Awards ===
- Korea: Commemorative Medal of the Emperor of Korea's Southwest Tour (April 14, 1910)
