= Takarabe Takeshi =

Japanese admiral (1867–1949)

- 財部 彪
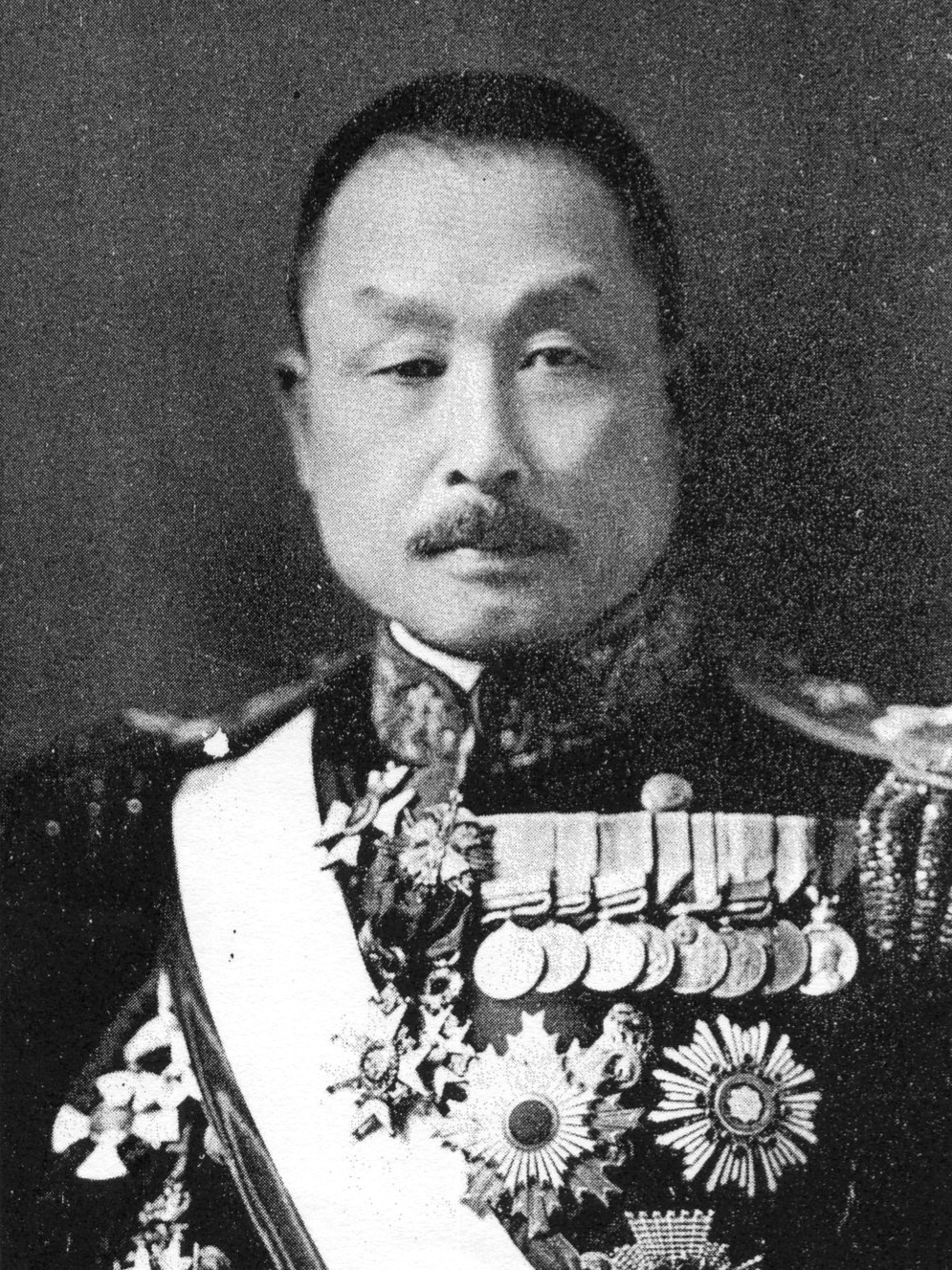

Minister of the Navy
- In office 2 July 1929 – 3 October 1930
- Prime Minister: Osachi Hamaguchi
- Preceded by: Okada Keisuke
- Succeeded by: Abo Kiyokazu
- In office 11 June 1924 – 20 April 1927
- Prime Minister: Katō Tomosaburō; Wakatsuki Reijirō
- Preceded by: Murakami Kakuichi
- Succeeded by: Okada Keisuke
- In office 15 May 1923 – 7 January 1924
- Prime Minister: Katō Tomosaburō; Yamamoto Gonnohyōe
- Preceded by: Katō Tomosaburō
- Succeeded by: Murakami Kakuichi

Member of the Supreme War Council
- In office 3 October 1930 – 6 April 1932
- Monarch: Hirohito
- In office 20 April 1927 – 2 July 1929
- Monarch: Hirohito
- In office 7 January 1924 – 11 June 1924
- Monarch: Taishō

Personal details
- Born: 7 April 1867 Miyakonojo, Miyazaki, Japan
- Died: 13 January 1949 (aged 81) Meguro, Tokyo, Japan
- Resting place: Aoyama Cemetery
- Relatives: Yamamoto Gonnohyōe (father-in-law)

Military service
- Allegiance: Empire of Japan
- Branch/service: Imperial Japanese Navy
- Years of service: 1889–1937
- Rank: Admiral
- Commands: Niji, Soya, Fuji; Ryojun Guard District, Maizuru Naval District, Sasebo Naval District, Yokosuka Naval District
- Battles/wars: First Sino-Japanese War; Russo-Japanese War

Takarabe Takeshi (財部 彪; 7 April 1867 – 13 January 1949) was an admiral in the Imperial Japanese Navy, and served as Navy Minister in the 1920s. He was also the son-in-law of Yamamoto Gonnohyōe.

== Biography ==
Takarabe was born in Miyakonojō city in Miyazaki Prefecture. He graduated at the top out of 80 cadets from the 15th class of the Imperial Japanese Naval Academy. His classmates included Takeo Hirose and Keisuke Okada.

When Takarabe was courting the daughter of Admiral Yamamoto Gonnohyōe, his close friend Takeo Hirose approached the admiral and requested that he refuse to allow his daughter to marry Takarabe. "Since Takarabe is a man of great talent and intelligence, he is destined to one day become an admiral. However, if he is married to your daughter, people will say that his advancement was due to family connections, rather than his abilities." However, Yamamoto ignored Hirose and allowed Takarabe to marry his daughter. As Hirose had predicted, with each promotion and advancement Takarabe later made in his career, he had enemies and detractors who attributed it to his family ties, and who called him “the princeling” behind his back.

Takarabe served his midshipman tour on the corvette Kongō, and cruiser Takachiho. After being commissioned as an ensign, he was assigned back to Takechiho, followed by the cruiser Matsushima. From 1891 to 1892, he was appointed naval attaché to France.

Returning to attend navigational training in Japan, Takarabe was promoted to lieutenant in 1894 and assigned to the cruiser Takao during the First Sino-Japanese War (1894–95), eventually becoming chief navigator.

From June 1897 to April 1899 Takarabe was sent to Great Britain for studies. After his return to Japan, he was promoted to lieutenant commander and assigned to the destroyer Niji, of which he became captain in 1900. He served in various postings within the Imperial Japanese Navy General Staff thereafter, becoming a commander in September 1903.

During the Russo-Japanese War, Takarabe served on the Imperial General Headquarters, formulating strategy and tactics. In 1905 he was promoted to captain, and after the end of the war, spent six months in England in 1907.

From September 1907 to September 1908, Takarabe was captain of the cruiser Soya, and from September–December 1908 captain of the battleship Fuji. He served as chief of staff of the IJN 1st fleet in 1909, and became Vice Minister of the Navy on his promotion to rear admiral in December 1909.

In December 1913, Takarabe was promoted to vice admiral. He was commander of the Ryojun Guard District in 1916, and commander in chief of the Maizuru Naval District in 1918, and commander in chief of the Sasebo Naval District in 1919.

Takarabe was promoted to full admiral in November 1919. He became commander in chief of the Yokosuka Naval District from July 1922.

In the aftermath of the 1923 Kantō Massacre, in which mainly ethnic Koreans were lynched and killed by Japanese mobs, Takarabe praised the mobs for their "martial spirit," and describing them as a successful result of military conscription.

From 15 May 1923 to 7 January 1924, Takarabe served as Naval Minister in the cabinets of Prime Minister Katō Tomosaburō and Prime Minister Yamamoto Gonnohyōe.

Takarabe was Navy Minister again from 11 June 1924 to 20 April 1927 in the cabinet of Prime Minister Katō Takaaki and first cabinet of Prime Minister Wakatsuki Reijirō, and once more from 2 July 1929 to 18 November 1929 in the cabinet of Prime Minister Hamaguchi Osachi.

From 1929–1930, Takarabe was on the Japanese delegation at the London Naval Treaty negotiations. Takarabe was considered a political moderate, and was a leading member of the Treaty Faction within the Imperial Japanese Navy. He strongly opposed the growing militarization of Japan, and sought to maintain diplomatic ties with Great Britain in hopes of reviving the Anglo-Japanese Alliance. His support of the London Treaty and disarmament led Takarabe to be branded a “traitor” by the rightists and by the Fleet Faction members of the Navy, and also led to an assassination attempt.

During his final term in office, the military was embroiled with the chain of command controversy as to whether or not the Imperial Japanese Army and Imperial Japanese Navy were answerable to the elected Diet of Japan and the Prime Minister, or were answerable only directly to the Emperor of Japan.

Takarabe went into the reserves in 1932, and retired in 1937.

Military offices
Preceded by Yamashita Gentarō	1st Fleet; Chief of Staff; 10 December 1908 – 1 December 1909	Succeeded by Nomaguchi Kaneo
Political offices
Preceded by Katō Tomosaburō	Vice-Minister of the Navy; 1 December 1909 - 17 April 1914	Succeeded by Suzuki Kantarō
Military offices
Preceded by Tsuchiya Mitsukane	3rd Fleet; Commander; 5 February 1915 - 13 December 1915	Fleet dissolved, post next held by Murakami Kakuichi
Preceded by Kawashima Reijirō	Ryōjun Naval Base; Commander; 13 December 1915 - 1 December 1916	Succeeded by Kuroi Teijirō
Preceded by Nawa Matahachirō	Maizuru Naval District; Commander-in-chief; 1 December 1917 - 1 December 1918	Succeeded by Nomaguchi Kaneo
Preceded by Yashiro Rokurō	Sasebo Naval District; Commander-in-chief; 1 December 1918 - 27 July 1922	Succeeded by Tochinai Sōjirō
Preceded by Yamaya Tanin	Yokosuka Naval District; Commander-in-chief; 27 July 1922 - 15 May 1923	Succeeded by Nomaguchi Kaneo
Political offices
Preceded by Katō Tomosaburō	Minister of the Navy; 15 May 1923 – 7 January 1924	Succeeded by Murakami Kakuichi
Preceded by Murakami Kakuichi	Minister of the Navy; 11 June 1924 – 20 April 1927	Succeeded by Okada Keisuke
Preceded by Okada Keisuke	Minister of the Navy; 2 July 1929 – 3 October 1930	Succeeded by Abo Kiyokazu
