= Taketomi Kunikane =

- 武富邦鼎
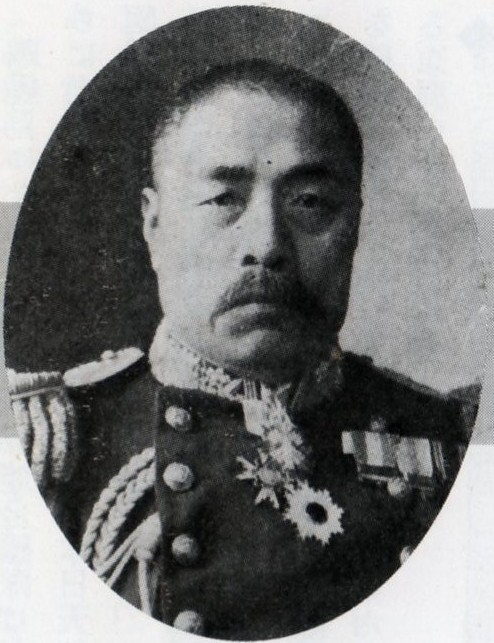
- Born: 19 December 1852; Saga, Saga, Japan
- Died: 17 November 1931 (aged 78)
- Military career
- Allegiance: Empire of Japan
- Branch: Imperial Japanese Navy
- Service years: 1872–1914
- Rank: Vice Admiral
- Conflicts: First Sino-Japanese War; Russo-Japanese War

Taketomi Kunikane (武富邦鼎; 19 December 1852 – 17 November 1931) was an admiral in the early Imperial Japanese Navy.

== Biography ==
Taketomi was born to a samurai family of Saga Domain. He attended naval artillery training in 1872 and served as a crewman on various vessels before he was commissioned into the Imperial Japanese Navy in February 1877 as a second lieutenant, but with the Naval Hydrographic Department. In November 1879 he was promoted to lieutenant, serving initially in shore postings with the Imperial Japanese Navy General Staff and the Yokosuka Naval District, followed by posting to the corvette Yamato and cruiser Naniwa. He subsequently served as a naval attache to Korea and on the staff of the Sasebo Naval District. He was promoted to lieutenant commander in December 1893.

During the First Sino-Japanese War, Taketomi served on the staff of Yokosuka Naval District. He was assigned to the Governor-General of Taiwan after the end of the war, and served as executive officer on the cruisers Izumi and Matsushima. He was given his first command, the gunboat Akagi in 1897. He was promoted to commander shortly thereafter, and then served as aide-de-camp to the Crown Prince. He was promoted to captain in October 1898.

From July 1901, Taketomi was captain of the cruiser Iwate, holding this position during the first half of the Russo-Japanese War. In January 1905 he was promoted to rear admiral and was appointed commander of the 5th Division of the IJN 3rd Third Fleet, and was at the Battle of Tsushima. From June 1905, he was commander of the Japanese Fourth Fleet. After the end of the war, he was made commander of the newly formed South China Fleet.

He then served in staff positions within the Ministry of the Navy of Japan and then commander of the Ōminato Guard District. In August 1909, he was promoted to vice admiral and entered the reserves the same day. He retired in March 1914.
