= Misu Sōtarō =

Japanese admiral

Baron Misu Sōtarō
- 三須 宗太郎
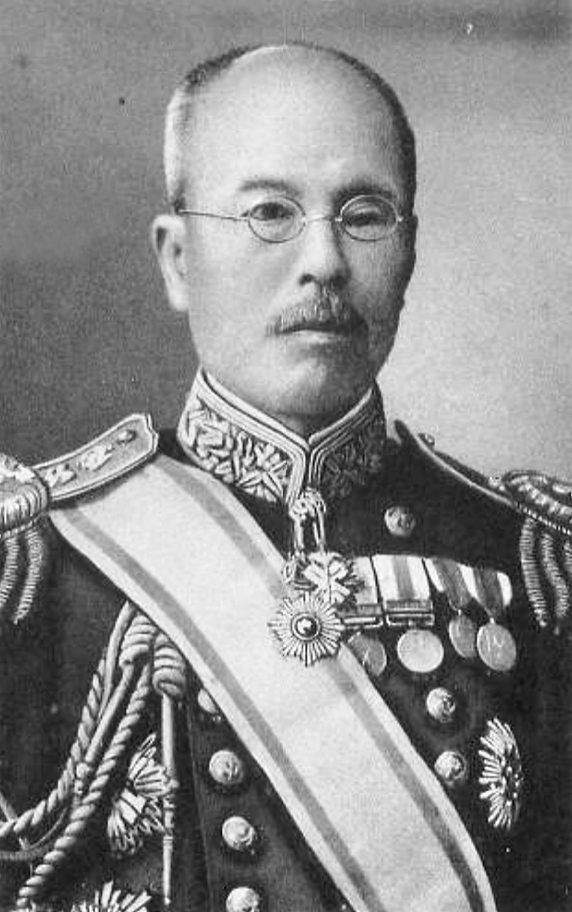
- Born: September 16, 1855; Hikone, Shiga, Japan
- Died: December 24, 1921 (aged 66)
- Military career
- Allegiance: Empire of Japan
- Branch: Imperial Japanese Navy
- Service years: 1878–1914
- Rank: Admiral
- Commands: Suma, Naniwa, Asahi, Naval Personnel Bureau, 2nd Squadron, 1st Squadron, Naval Education Bureau, Ryojun Guard District, Vice-chief of Navy General Staff, Maizuru Naval District
- Conflicts: Satsuma Rebellion; Russo-Japanese War

Baron Misu Sōtarō (三須 宗太郎, Sōtarō Misu; 16 September 1855 – 24 December 1921) was an admiral in the early Imperial Japanese Navy.

== Early life ==
Misu was born in Hikone as the eldest son in a samurai class family. His father, Misu Kumajirō, was a retainer of the Ii clan, and was assigned command of the defenses of Edo Bay against the incursions of foreign vessels. After the Meiji Restoration, in August 1872, Misu entered the fledgling Imperial Japanese Navy; however, the navy was dominated former Satsuma samurai who were highly antagonistic to people from Hikone. Furthermore, his classmate, Dewa Shigetō, was from Aizu-Wakamatsu, whose former Matsudaira lords were the sworn enemies of the Hikone Ii clan. Misu survived partly through his father's connections with Yoshida Shōin, and through the support and patronage of Ijuin Gorō.

== Naval career ==
In 1874, Misu was assigned to the training ship Tsukuba for studies in navigation. During the Satsuma Rebellion of 1877, Tsukuba was sent to Kyūshū and its crew was assigned shore duty as infantry. However, Misu was ordered to remain aboard the ship for logistics duties.

In August 1878, Misu was commissioned as an ensign. He was promoted to second lieutenant two years later, and lieutenant after another five years. The slowness of his promotion can also be attributed to clan factionalism within the navy. He served initially on the battleship Settsu and cruiser Asama, and in 1885 was assigned to the new cruiser Naniwa on its voyage to Great Britain. After serving as senior gunnery officer on the Naniwa, Misu was appointed its captain in 1887.

Afterwards, he was subsequently captain of Asama, Ryūjō, and then served as commander of the Yokosuka Naval District. In September 1893, he was reassigned to serve in the Imperial Japanese Navy General Staff as head of the Naval Personnel Bureau. He was in charge of payroll, awards and promotions, burial of fallen sailors, compensation to families, etc., and served in this desk job throughout the First Sino-Japanese War.

In 1897, Misu returned to the sea as captain of the Suma. He went to England to supervise the construction of the new cruiser Izumo, and brought the new battleship Asahi back to Japan. In 1901, he was promoted to rear admiral and recalled as head of the Naval Personnel Bureau in the Navy General Staff. However, his duties were greatly enlarged by the buildup of the Japanese navy prior to the outbreak of the Russo-Japanese War of 1904–1905.

During the personnel reorganization within the navy prior to the war, Naval Minister Yamamoto Gonnohyōe was convinced that victory could not be obtained unless Admiral Hidaka Sonojo was replaced by Tōgō Heihachirō. As head of the navy Personnel Bureau, Misu was in a strong position to encourage Yamamoto towards this action. He also recommended Kataoka Shichirō and Shibayama Yahachi as possible successors should something happen to Tōgō in battle. This was quite controversial, as Admiral Kamimura Hikonojō in command of the IJN 2nd Fleet would normally have been appointed successor. Misu reported that Kamimura was of aggressive, even reckless disposition, which made him ideal for leading with aggressive tactics for the Second Fleet, but that this same disposition was a detriment to his ability to replace Tōgō.

In 1905, Misu was promoted to vice admiral, and placed under Tōgō's direct control. Given command of the Nisshin, he was in the line of battle at the Battle of Tsushima, and was wounded in the left eye. Making the most of this injury, Misu was compared with the famous one-eyed warrior Date Masamune.

Following the conclusion of the war, he was ennobled with the title of baron under the kazoku peerage system. In 1906, he commanded the Ryojun Guard District From 1909 to 1911, he was placed in charge of reconstruction of the Maizuru Naval District. The operational area of Maizuru encompassed his home town of Hikone, which has no access to the sea. He went on the reserve list in 1913 as full admiral and died in 1921.

Military offices
Preceded by Shibayama Yahachi	Ryōjun Port Naval District; Commander-in-chief; 2 February 1906 - 1 October 1906	Command reorganized Himself
Command reorganized Himself	Ryōjun Naval District; Commander-in-chief; 1 October 1906 - 22 November 1906	Succeeded by Hashimoto Masaaki
Preceded by Kataoka Shichirō	Maizuru Naval District; Commander-in-chief; 18 January 1911 - 25 September 1913	Succeeded by Yashiro Rokurō
