= Murakami Kakuichi =

Japanese admiral (1862–1927)

- 村上 格一
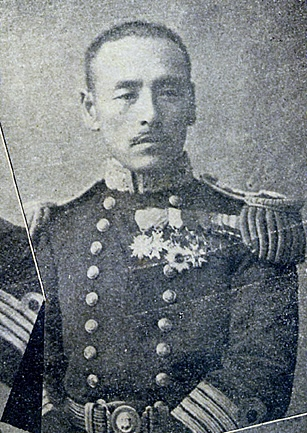

Minister of the Navy
- In office 7 January 1924 – 11 June 1924
- Prime Minister: Kiyoura Keigo
- Preceded by: Takarabe Takeshi
- Succeeded by: Takarabe Takeshi

Member of the Supreme War Council
- In office 11 June 1924 – 10 December 1924
- Monarch: Taishō
- In office 27 July 1922 – 7 January 1924
- Monarch: Taishō

Personal details
- Born: 21 December 1862 Saga, Hizen, Japan
- Died: 15 November 1927 (aged 64) Zushi, Kanagawa, Japan

Military service
- Allegiance: Empire of Japan
- Branch/service: Imperial Japanese Navy
- Years of service: 1884–1924
- Rank: Admiral
- Commands: Chiyoda, Azuma, Naval Construction Bureau, 3rd Fleet, Naval Education Bureau, Kure Naval District, Naval Councillor
- Battles/wars: First Sino-Japanese War; Russo-Japanese War; Battle of Chemulpo Bay; Battle of Tsushima; World War I; Battle of Tsingtao

Murakami Kakuichi (村上 格一, Kakuichi Murakami; 21 December 1862 – 15 November 1927) was an admiral in the Imperial Japanese Navy, and served as Navy Minister in the early 1920s.

== Biography ==
Murakami was born in Saga Prefecture as the eldest son to a samurai of Saga Domain. He moved to Ibaraki Prefecture when his father was appointed an official under the new Meiji government and initially intended to study medicine. He graduated from the 11th class of the Imperial Japanese Naval Academy, ranked 2nd out of 26 cadets. He served on a number of ships in the early Imperial Japanese Navy, including the corvettes Tsukuba, Yamato, Jingei, Tenryū and the cruiser Takachiho. Promoted to lieutenant in 1889, he was a specialist in torpedo warfare and was assigned as chief torpedo officer on the cruiser Yoshino in 1893 on its year-long voyage to the United Kingdom.

After the end of the First Sino-Japanese War, Murakami was sent as a naval attaché to France from June 1897 to May 1900. During his time in France, he was promoted to lieutenant commander, and then to commander. On his return, he served in a number of staff positions before he was appointed executive officer to the Chin'en in 1902. In July 1903, he received his first command, the cruiser Chiyoda. He was promoted to captain the same year and continued as captain of Chiyoda in the early stages of the Russo-Japanese War. On 12 January 1905, he became captain of the cruiser Azuma.

Murakami was promoted to rear admiral on 28 August 1908 and vice admiral on 1 December 1912, from which time he was director of the Kure Naval Arsenal, followed by Naval Shipbuilding Command. It was largely at his insistence that the new battlecruiser Kongō was equipped with 14 inch guns instead of 12 inch guns as originally planned. However, Murakami's plans for further modernization of the Imperial Japanese Navy and introduction of new technologies were brought to a halt by the Siemens scandal.

During World War I, from December 1915 to April 1917, Murakami was commander in chief of the IJN 3rd Fleet, and played an active role in the Battle of Tsingtao and the occupation of German colonies in the South Pacific. From 1917 to 1918, he was in charge of the Naval Training Bureau, and became a full admiral on 2 July 1918. From December 1919 to July 1922, he was commander in chief of the Kure Naval District. He subsequently served on the Supreme War Council.

From 7 January 1924 to 11 June 1924, Murakami served as Naval Minister in the cabinet of Prime Minister Keigo Kiyoura.

He went into the reserves in 1924, and died in 1927.

== Notes ==
Military offices
Fleet recreated, post last held by Takarabe Takeshi	3rd Fleet; Commander-in-chief; 13 December 1915 - 6 April 1917	Succeeded by Arima Ryōkitsu
Preceded by Katō Sadakichi	Kure Naval District; Commander-in-chief; 1 December 1919 - 27 July 1922	Succeeded by Suzuki Kantarō
Political offices
Preceded by Takarabe Takeshi	Minister of the Navy; 7 January 1924 – 11 June 1924	Succeeded by Takarabe Takeshi
