= Ryojun Guard District =

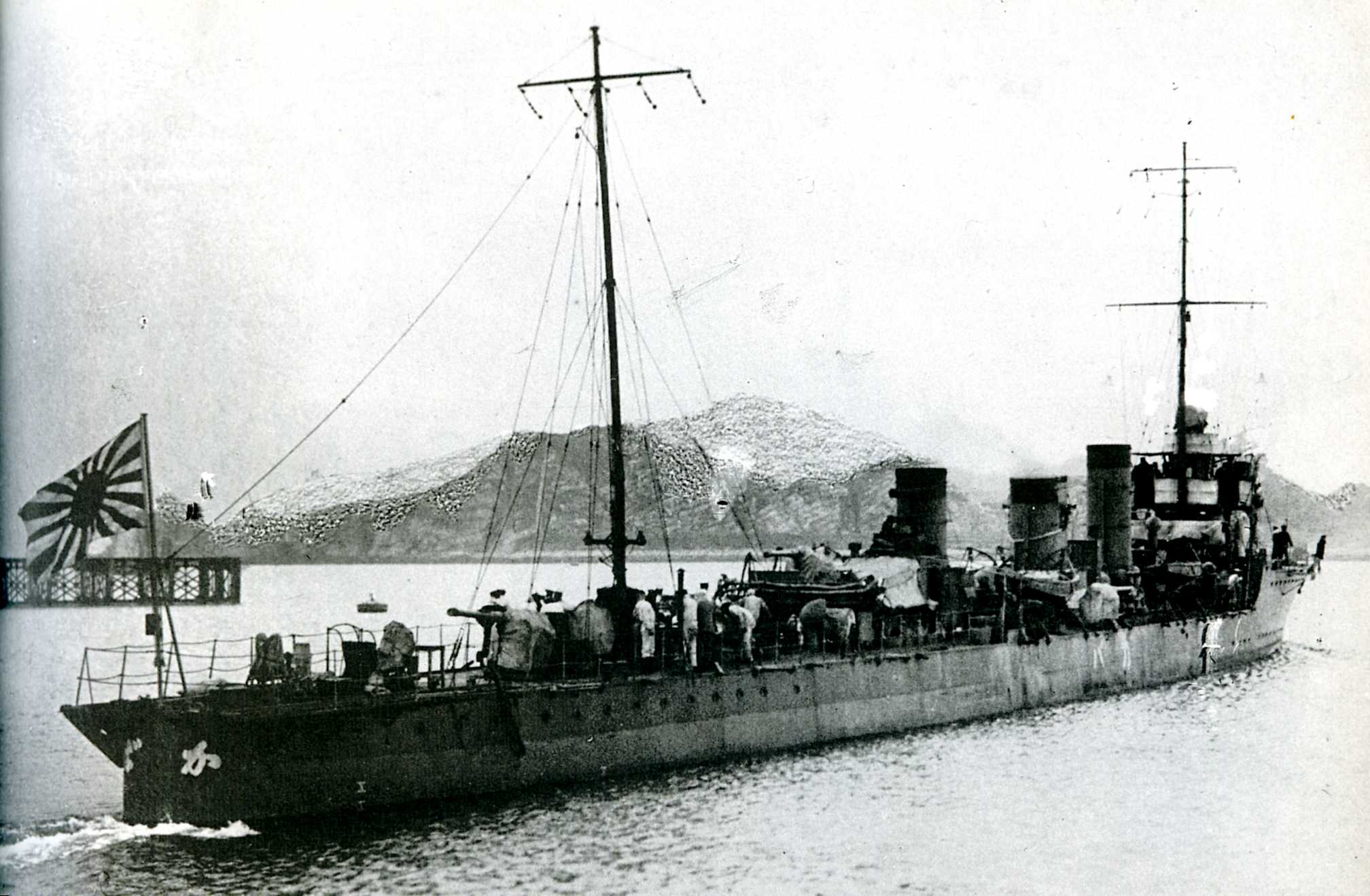
Japanese destroyer Kaba entering Ryojun

The Ryojun Guard District (旅順要港部, Ryojun Yōkōbu) was the major navy base for the Imperial Japanese Navy in the Kwantung Leased Territory before and during Second Sino-Japanese War. Located in at Ryojun 38°48′45″N 121°14′30″E), (present-day Lüshunkou, China, The Ryojun Guard District was responsible for control of the strategic seaward approaches to Manchukuo and to north China and for patrols in the Yellow Sea and along the China coastlines. It was disbanded in 1943.

== History ==
The Guard Districts (警備府, Keibifu) were second tier naval bases, similar to the first tier Naval Districts (鎮守府), with docking, fueling and resupply facilities, but typically lacked a shipyard or training school. They tended to be established by strategic waterways or major port cities for defensive purposes. In concept, the Guard District was similar to the United States Navy Sea Frontiers concept. the Guard District maintained a small garrison force of ships and Naval Land Forces which reported directly to the Guard District commander, and hosted detachments of the numbered fleets on a temporary assignment basis.

The port of Ryojun on the Kwantung Peninsula was an area with a long association with the Imperial Japanese Navy, having been first seized during the First Sino-Japanese War in December 1894. Japan was forced to abandon the port due to the Triple Intervention in February 1896, and its port facilities were soon occupied and developed by the Imperial Russian Navy as Port Arthur, Russia's most important naval base in the Far East.

The Russian naval base was seized by Japan after the Battle of Port Arthur in August 1904 and was proclaimed the Ryojun Naval District (龍順鎮守府). However, it lacked the shipyards, armories and the training facilities associated with other naval districts, (for which it relied on Sasebo Naval District). Tasked primarily with coastal patrols of the Liaodong Peninsula and control of the strategic seaward approaches to Tianjin and Beijing, it was regarded as a prestigious posting, with its commander receiving his commission directly from the Emperor.

However, on March 14, 1914, the status of the Ryojun Naval District was reduced to that of a third echelon naval port, or yōkōbu (要港部). It served as a staging point and refueling base in World War I for operations against the Imperial German Navy’s East Asia Squadron based out of Qingdao. With the Allied victory in World War I eliminating the German threat and with the Washington Naval Treaty limiting naval forces, Ryojun Military Port was deactivated on December 1, 1922.

In April 1933, the base was reactivated, and its role expanding to include patrols and guard of the coastline of Manchukuo. On November 20, 1941, in anticipation of the coming war with the United States, Ryojun was upgraded to Guard District status.

However, on January 15, 1942, with Japan in full control of the seaward approaches to China and Manchukuo, the Guard District was again deactivated.

== Order of Battle at time of the attack on Pearl Harbor ==
- Ryojun Guard District
- Minesweeper Division 32
  - Shanan Maru #16

== List of commanders ==
Commanding officer

	Name	Dates
1	Admiral Baron Yahachi Shibayama	6 Feb 1905 – 2 Feb 1906
2	Admiral Baron Sotaro Misu	2 Feb 1906 – 22 Nov 1906
3	Vice-Admiral Baron Masaaki Hashimoto	22 Nov 1906 – 28 Aug 1908
4	Vice-Admiral Baron Sadayasu Tomioka	28 Aug 1908 – 1 Dec 1910
5	Vice-Admiral Hikohachi Yamada	1 Dec 1910 – 1 Dec 1912
6	Vice-Admiral Hajime Sakamoto	1 Dec 1912 – 1 Apr 1914
7	Vice-Admiral Reijiro Kawashima	1 Apr 1914 – 13 Dec 1915
8	Vice-Admiral Takeshi Takarabe	13 Dec 1915 – 1 Dec 1916
9	Admiral Teijiro Kuroi	1 Dec 1916 – 1 Dec 1918
10	Vice-Admiral Tatsuo Matsumura	1 Dec 1918 – 1 Oct 1920
11	Vice-Admiral Naoe Nakano	1 Oct 1920 – 1 Dec 1921
12	Vice-Admiral Kesataro Kawahara	1 Dec 1921 – 10 Dec 1922
X	Deactivated	10 Dec 1922 – 20 Apr 1933
13	Vice-Admiral Shizue Tsuda	20 Apr 1933 – 1 Jul 1933
14	Vice-Admiral Yurikazu Edahara	1 Jul 1933 – 15 Nov 1934
15	Vice-Admiral Kichijiro Hamada	15 Nov 1934 – 15 Nov 1935
16	Admiral Hideho Wada	15 Nov 1935 – 1 Dec 1936
17	Vice-Admiral Masaichi Maeda	1 Dec 1936 – 15 Nov 1938
18	Vice-Admiral Ichiro Sato	15 Nov 1938 – 15 Nov 1939
19	Vice-Admiral Boshiro Hosogaya	15 Nov 1939 – 15 Nov 1940
20	Vice-Admiral Teruhisa Komatsu	15 Nov 1940 – 5 Jul 1941
21	Vice-Admiral Hidehiko Ukita	5 Jul 1941 – 5 Jan 1942

Chief of Staff

	Name	Dates
1	Vice-Admiral Chikataka Tamari	7 Jan 1905 – 22 Nov 1906
2	Rear-Admiral Tomokazu Takigawa	22 Nov 1906 – 28 Aug 1908
3	Vice-Admiral Yasutaro Egashira	28 Aug 1908 – 1 Dec 1909
4	Rear-Admiral Genzaburo Ogi	1 Dec 1909 – 1 Dec 1910
5	Vice-Admiral Tadamichi Kamaya	1 Dec 1910 – 1 Dec 1911
6	Rear-Admiral Sukeshiro Hanabusa	1 Dec 1911 – 6 Dec 1911
7	Rear-Admiral Yoshimoto Shoji	6 Dec 1911 – 1 Dec 1912
8	Rear-Admiral Sadaichi Hiraoka	1 Dec 1912 – 1 Dec 1913
9	Rear-Admiral Masaki Nakamura	8 May 1914 – 11 May 1916
10	Rear-Admiral Kanshiro Haji	11 May 1916 – 1 Dec 1917
11	Rear-Admiral Kametaro Muta	12 Feb 1918 – 10 Nov 1918
12	Rear-Admiral Kenkichi Wada	20 Nov 1920 – 1 Apr 1922
13	Vice-Admiral Kiyohiro Ijichi	1 Apr 1922 – 10 Nov 1922
X	Deactivated	10 Dec 1922 – 20 Apr 1933
14	Rear-Admiral Hisoharu Kubota	20 Apr 1933 – 15 Nov 1935
15	Vice-Admiral Chuichi Hara	15 Nov 1935 – 1 Dec 1937
16	Vice-Admiral Shintaro Hashimoto	1 Dec 1937 – 15 Nov 1939
17	Rear-Admiral Isamu Takeda	15 Nov 1939 – 1 Nov 1940
18	Rear-Admiral Keizo Tanimoto	1 Nov 1940 – 5 Jan 1942
