= Japanese cruiser Nisshin =

Imperial Japanese Navy's Kasuga-class cruiser

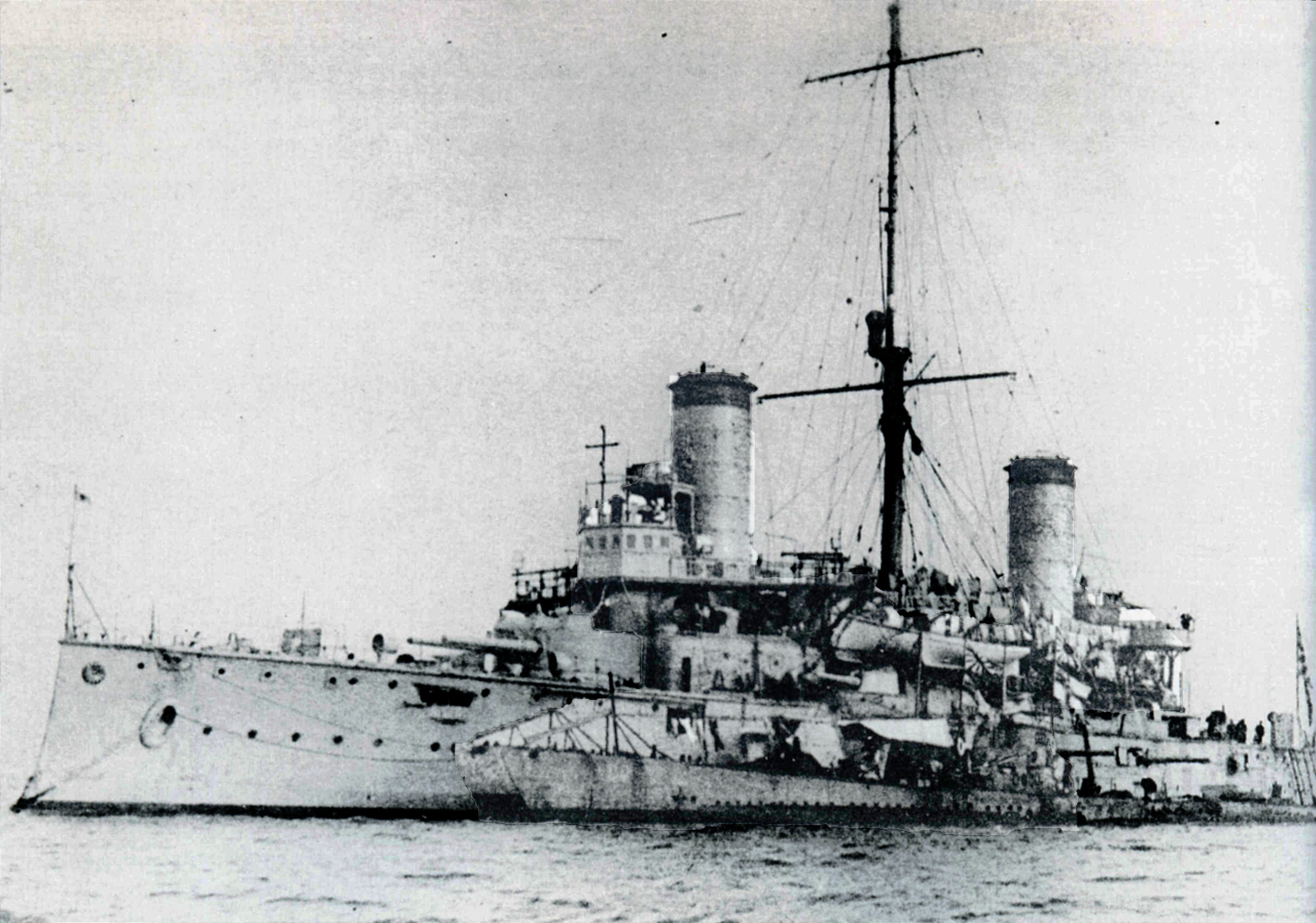
- Nisshin at Malta with two surrendered U-boats, 1919

History

Empire of Japan
- Name: Nisshin
- Ordered: 23 December 1901
- Builder: Gio. Ansaldo & C.
- Laid down: 29 March 1902
- Launched: 9 February 1903
- Acquired: 30 December 1903
- Commissioned: 7 January 1904
- Stricken: 1 April 1935
- Fate: Sunk as a target ship, 1936; Later raised and again expended as a target ship, 18 January 1942

General characteristics
- Class & type: Giuseppe Garibaldi-class cruiser
- Displacement: 7,700 t (7,578 long tons)
- Length: 111.73 m (366 ft 7 in) (o/a)
- Beam: 18.71 m (61 ft 5 in)
- Draft: 7.35 m (24 ft 1 in)
- Depth: 12.1 m (39 ft 8 in)
- Installed power: 8 Scotch marine boilers; 13,500 ihp (10,100 kW)
- Propulsion: 2 Shafts; 2 triple-expansion steam engines
- Speed: 20 knots (37 km/h; 23 mph)
- Range: 5,500 nmi (10,200 km; 6,300 mi) at 10 knots (19 km/h; 12 mph)
- Complement: 600
- Armament: 2 × twin 8 in (203 mm) guns; 14 × single QF 6 in (152 mm) guns; 10 × single QF 3 in (76 mm) guns; 4 × single 3 pdr (1.5 in (38 mm)) guns; 4 × 18 in (457 mm) torpedo tubes
- Armor: Belt: 70–150 mm (2.8–5.9 in); Deck: 20–40 mm (0.79–1.57 in); Barbette: 100–150 mm (3.9–5.9 in); Conning tower: 150 mm (5.9 in)

Nisshin (日進), also transliterated as Nissin, was a Kasuga-class cruiser of the Imperial Japanese Navy, built in the first decade of the 20th century by Gio. Ansaldo & C., Sestri Ponente, Italy, where the type was known as the Giuseppe Garibaldi class. The ship was originally ordered by the Royal Italian Navy in 1901 as San Rocco and sold the next year to the Argentine Navy who renamed her Mariano Moreno during the Argentine–Chilean naval arms race, but the lessening of tensions with Chile and financial pressures caused the Argentinians to sell her before delivery. At that time tensions between the Empire of Japan and the Russian Empire were rising, and the ship was offered to both sides before she was purchased by the Japanese.

During the Russo-Japanese War of 1904–05, Nisshin participated in the Battle of the Yellow Sea and was damaged in the subsequent Battle of Tsushima. In addition, she frequently bombarded the defenses of Port Arthur. The ship played a limited role in World War I and was used to escort Allied convoys and search for German commerce raiders in the Indian Ocean and Australasia. In 1918, Nisshin was deployed to the Mediterranean and then escorted the surrendered German submarines allocated to Japan from Britain after the war. She became a training ship in 1927 and was sunk as a target ship in 1936. Her wreck was later refloated and used as a target again in 1942.

== Background ==
Nisshin was the last of the 10 Giuseppe Garibaldi-class armored cruisers to be built. The first ship had been completed in 1895 and the class had enjoyed considerable export success, with the base design being gradually improved over the years. The last two ships of the class were ordered on 23 December 1901 by the Royal Italian Navy, and sold in 1902 to the Argentine Navy in response to the order placed to a British shipbuilder by Chile for two second-class battleships. The possibility of war between Argentina and Chile, however, abated before the vessel was completed, and a combination of financial problems and British pressure forced Argentina to dispose of Mariano Moreno and her sister ship, Bernardino Rivadavia. The Argentine government attempted to sell the ships to Russia, but negotiations failed over the price demanded by the Argentinians. The Japanese government quickly stepped in and purchased them due to increasing tensions with Russia despite the high price of ¥14,937,390 (£1,530,000) for the two sisters. Already planning to attack Russia, the government delayed their surprise attack on Port Arthur that began the Russo-Japanese War until the ships had left Singapore and could not be delayed or interned by any foreign power.

== Design and description ==
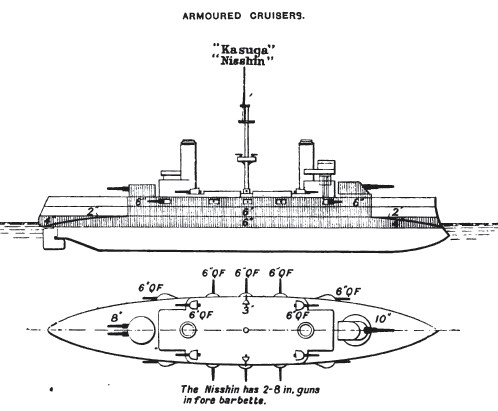
Right elevation and deck plan of the Kasuga-class cruisers from Brassey's Naval Annual 1906. Nisshin had a second twin 8-inch turret in place of the forward 10-inch turret of Kasuga.

Nisshin had an overall length of 111.73 meters (366 ft 7 in), a beam of 18.71 meters (61 ft 5 in), a molded depth of 12.1 meters (39 ft 8 in) and a deep draft of 7.35 meters (24 ft 1 in). She displaced 7,700 metric tons (7,600 long tons) at normal load. The ship was powered by two vertical triple-expansion steam engines, each driving one shaft, using steam from 8 coal-fired Scotch marine boilers. Designed for a maximum output of 13,500 indicated horsepower (10,100 kW) and a speed of 20 knots (37 km/h; 23 mph), Nisshin barely exceeded this, reaching a speed of 20.15 knots (37.32 km/h; 23.19 mph) during her sea trials on 6 November 1903 despite 14,896 ihp (11,108 kW) produced by her engines. She had a cruising range of 5,500 nautical miles (10,200 km; 6,300 mi) at 10 knots (19 km/h; 12 mph). Her complement consisted of 560 officers and enlisted men.

Her main armament consisted of four 8 in (203 mm) Type 41 guns, in twin-gun turrets fore and aft of the superstructure. Ten of the quick-firing (QF) 6 in (152 mm) Type 41 guns that comprised her secondary armament were arranged in casemates amidships on the main deck; the remaining four guns were mounted on the upper deck. Nisshin also had ten QF 3 in (76 mm) Type 41 guns and four QF 3-pounder 1.5 in (38 mm)) Hotchkiss guns to defend herself against torpedo boats. She was fitted with four submerged 18 in (460 mm) torpedo tubes, two on each side.

The ship's waterline armor belt had a maximum thickness of 150 millimeters (5.9 in) amidships and tapered to 70 millimeters (2.8 in) towards the ends of the ship. Between the main gun barbettes it covered the entire side of the ship up to the level of the upper deck. The ends of the central armored citadel were enclosed by transverse bulkheads 120 millimeters (4.7 in) thick. The forward barbette, the conning tower, and gun turrets were also protected by 150-millimeter armor while the aft barbette only had 100 millimeters (3.9 in) of armor. Her deck armor ranged from 20 to 40 millimeters (0.8 to 1.6 in) thick and the six-inch guns on the upper deck were protected by gun shields.

== Construction and career ==
The ship's keel was laid down on 29 March 1902 with the temporary name of San Roca and she was launched on 9 February 1903 and renamed Mariano Moreno by the Argentinians. The vessel was sold to Japan on 30 December 1903 and renamed Nisshin on 1 January 1904. Nisshin and her newly renamed sister Kasuga were formally turned over to Japan and commissioned on 7 January. The sisters departed Genoa on 9 January under the command of British captains and manned by British seamen and Italian stokers. When they arrived at Port Said, Egypt, five days later, they encountered the Russian protected cruiser Aurora and reached Suez on the 16th, accompanied by the British armored cruiser King Alfred. The Japanese ships reached Singapore on 2 February where they were slightly delayed by a coolie strike.

=== Russo-Japanese War ===
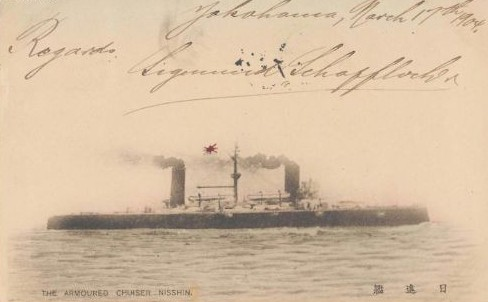
A postcard of Nisshin, early 1904

Nisshin and Kasuga reached Yokosuka on 16 February just as Japan initiated hostilities with its surprise attack on Port Arthur, and began working up with Japanese crews. The sisters were assigned to reinforce the battleships of the 1st Division of the 1st Fleet under the overall command of Admiral Tōgō Heihachirō on 11 April. In an effort to block the Russian ships in Port Arthur, Togo ordered a minefield laid at the mouth of the harbor on 12 April and Kasuga and Nisshin were tasked to show themselves "as a demonstration of our power". Tōgō successfully lured out a portion of the Russian Pacific Squadron, including Vice Admiral Stepan Makarov's flagship, the battleship Petropavlovsk. When Makarov spotted the five Japanese battleships and Kasuga and Nisshin, he turned back for Port Arthur and his flagship ran into the minefield just laid by the Japanese. The ship sank in less than two minutes after one of her magazines exploded, and Makarov was one of the 677 killed. In addition to this loss, the battleship Pobeda was damaged by a mine. Emboldened by his success, Tōgō resumed long-range bombardment missions, making use of the long-range capabilities of Nisshin and Kasuga's guns to blindly bombard Port Arthur on 15 April from Pigeon Bay, on the southwest side of the Liaodong Peninsula, at a range of 9.5 kilometers (5.9 mi). The engagements were not entirely one-sided as the battleship Peresvet scored a hit on Nisshin that same day. In early May, the sisters fired at ranges up to 18 kilometers (11 mi) although this proved to be ineffective.

On 15 May, the battleships Yashima and Hatsuse were sunk by Russian mines. With a third of Japan's battleships lost, Tōgō decided to use Nisshin and Kasuga in the line of battle together with his four remaining battleships. The first test of this decision would have occurred on 23 June when the Pacific Squadron sortied in an abortive attempt to reach Vladivostok, but the new squadron commander, Rear Admiral Wilgelm Vitgeft, ordered the squadron to return to Port Arthur when it encountered the Japanese battleline (including Nisshin and Kasuga) shortly before sunset, as he did not wish to engage his numerically superior opponents in a night battle. On 27 July, the sisters forced a Russian force of one battleship and several cruisers and gunboats to return to port because of long-range gun fire after they sortied to provide fire support to the Russian Army.

They participated in the Battle of the Yellow Sea on 10 August, but only played a minor role as they were generally in the rear of the Japanese battleline. For the brief amount of time when Tōgō reversed course, Nisshin was at the head of the battleline and was hit three times during the battle, losing 14 crewmen killed and 25 wounded. After the battle the sisters returned to Pigeon Bay where they engaged the Russian fortifications.

At the subsequent Battle of Tsushima on 26 May 1905, Nisshin was flagship of Vice-Admiral Misu Sotarō, and was sixth and last in the line of battle, following Kasuga. At about 14:10, Nisshin opened fire on the Oslyabya, the lead ship in the second column of the Russian fleet at a range of 7,000 yards (6,400 m). At 14:40 Nisshin received her first hit as a Russian 12-inch (305 mm) shell cut her forward right 8-inch gun in half. Between 14:57 and 15:05, the Japanese fleet reversed course to block the Russian northward movement, which put Nisshin as the first ship in the battle line. At 15:00, a 12-inch shell punched through the armor belt of Nisshin one foot below the waterline and flooded a coal bunker. Another 12-inch shell hit the belt about three feet above the waterline but did not penetrate. At 15:06, the Russian protected cruiser Zhemchug attempted to close for a torpedo attack but was driven off by fire from Nisshin, Kasuga and the armored cruiser Iwate at 3,300 yards (3,000 m). At 15:30, the Japanese line again reversed course, placing Nisshin at the rear again. Another 12-inch hit struck the ship but without any significant damage. At 16:05, a 9-inch (229 mm) hit on the forward turret sent splinters into the conning tower, wounding Misu. Nisshin was hit again at 17:20 by another 12-inch shell, which cut the left 8-inch gun of her aft turret in half. As daylight was dying, Nisshin was hit yet again at 19:00 by another 12-inch shell that severed the barrel of her forward left 8-inch gun, leaving only a single gun operable. The surviving Russian ships were located near the Liancourt Rocks by the Japanese the following morning and Tōgō reached them about 10:00. Heavily outnumbering the Russians, he opted for a long-range engagement to minimize any losses and Kasuga opened fire at the obsolete Imperator Nikolai I at a range of 9,100 meters (10,000 yd) and the Russians surrendered shortly afterwards.

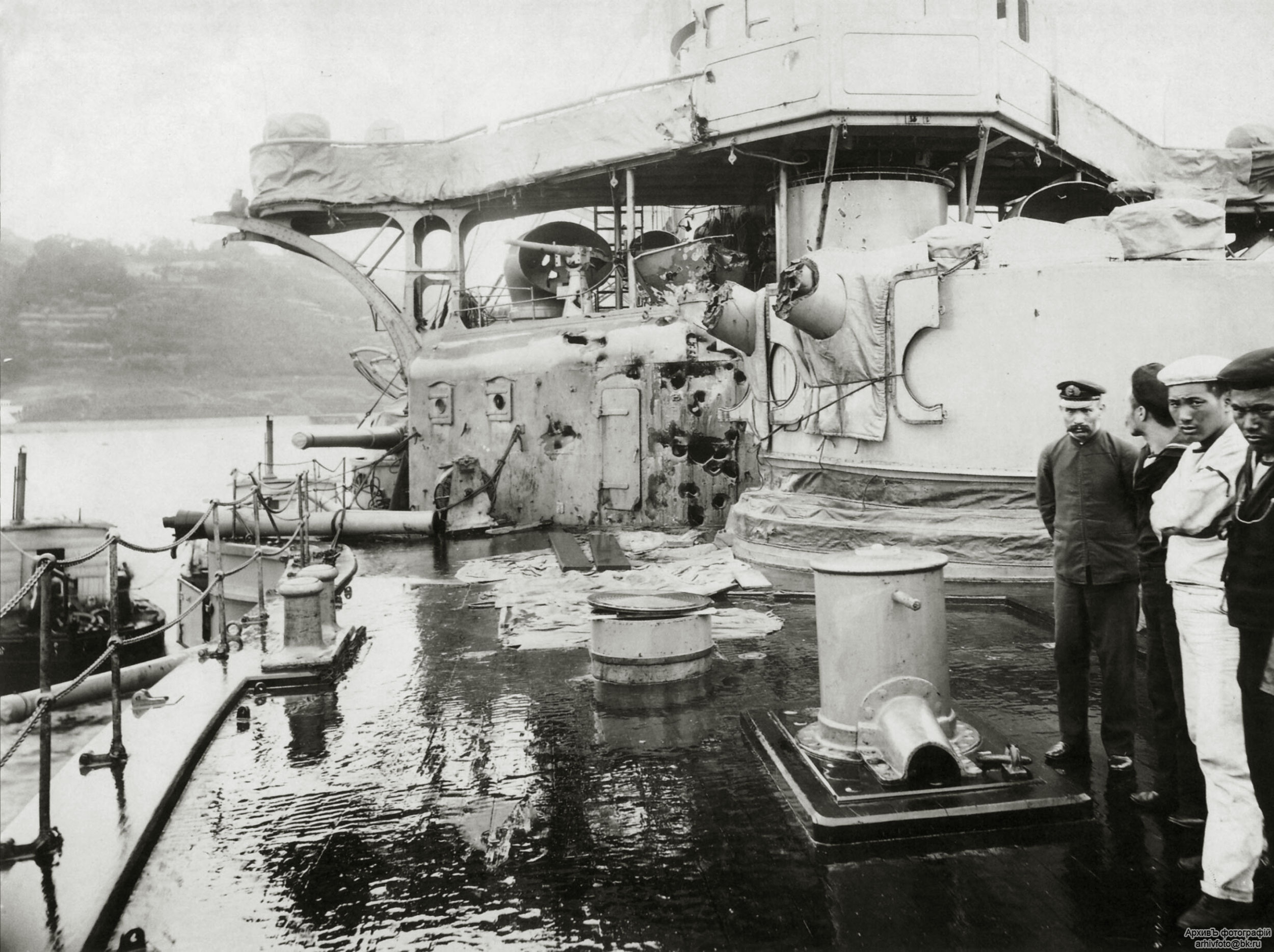
The forward turret and superstructure after the Battle of Tsushima

Nisshin fired 181 eight-inch shells during the battle. In return she received the second largest number of hits after Tōgō's flagship, the battleship Mikasa, which was struck over 40 times. Nisshin was hit by 13 shells, including 6 twelve-inch, 1 nine-inch, 2 six-inch and 4 unidentified. During the battle, the newly commissioned Ensign Isoroku Takano, later Commander-in-Chief of the Combined Fleet in World War II, was badly wounded and lost two fingers on his left hand.

Shortly after the battle, Nisshin was assigned to the 3rd Fleet for the invasion and occupation of Sakhalin in July–August. On 2 September 1911, the ship escorted the ex-Russian hospital ship Anegawa to Vladivostok to be returned to the Russians. In November 1912, a boiler exploded aboard the ship, killing 20 crewmen. At the start of 1914, she was overhauled with her boilers replaced by 12 Kampon Type 1 water-tube boilers.

=== World War I and subsequent history ===
As part of the search for the German East Asia Squadron and other commerce raiders the British Admiralty requested in mid-September 1914 that the Japanese forces in the South Pacific be reinforced to deal with the threats posed by the Germans and the cruiser was ordered south. Nisshin struck an uncharted rock off Sandakan on 12 October and was forced to put into Singapore for repairs. After their completion the ship was assigned to the Second South Seas Squadron based at Truk. In February 1915, the ship visited the occupied colonies of German Samoa and German New Guinea. Niishin served as the flagship of Destroyer Squadron (Suiraisentai) 1 from 13 December 1915 to 13 May 1916, 12 September to 1 December 1916 and then of Suiraisentai 2 from 28 March to 13 April 1917. After the incursion of the German commerce raider SMS Wolf into the Indian Ocean in March 1917, the Admiralty requested that the Japanese government reinforce its ships already present, there and in Australian waters. Nisshin was sent south in response and escorted Allied shipping between Colombo, Ceylon and Fremantle, Australia in April–May.

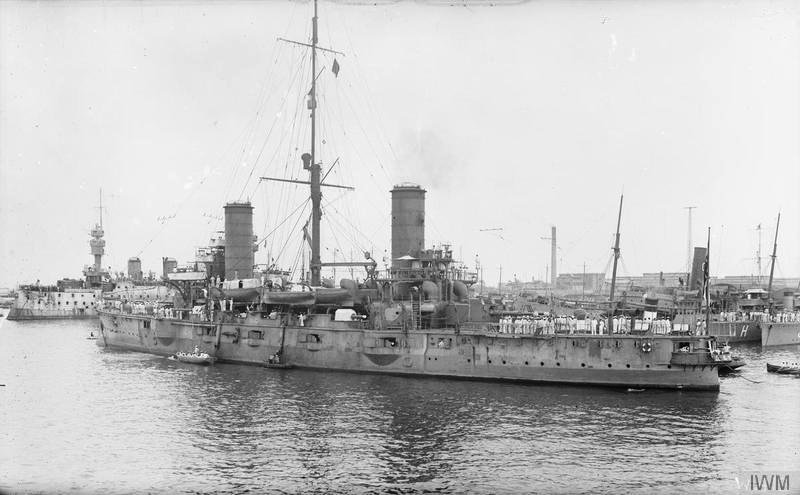
Nisshin at anchor in Port Said, Egypt, 27 October 1917

In 1918, the ship was sent to the Mediterranean to reinforce the Second Special Mission Squadron as it escorted Allied troop convoys across the Mediterranean. In November, she became the flagship of Rear Admiral Kōzō Satō, the squadron commander, as the bulk of the squadron sailed to Constantinople, arriving on 6 December. The ship then sailed to Portland to escort the surrendered German submarines allocated to Japan back home. She arrived on 5 January 1919 and the squadron departed for Malta at the end of March. After refitting some of the submarines there, the squadron arrived at Yokosuka on 18 June.

In 1924 two of her 3 in/40 guns were removed, as were all of her QF 3-pounder Hotchkiss guns, and a single 8 cm/40 3rd Year Type anti-aircraft gun was added. Nisshin became a training vessel and depot ship in 1927 at Yokosuka Naval District until stricken from the naval register on 1 April 1935. Renamed Hai-Kan No. 6, she was sunk as a target ship during live-fire exercises at the Kamegakubi Naval Proving Ground off Kure in the Inland Sea in 1936. Her wreck was later raised, and, on 18 January 1942, it was towed by the battleship Mutsu as a target for the battleship Yamato with her new 18.1 inch guns off Kurahashi, Hiroshima. The hulk was sunk for a second, and final, time during this exercise.
