= Suma-class cruiser =

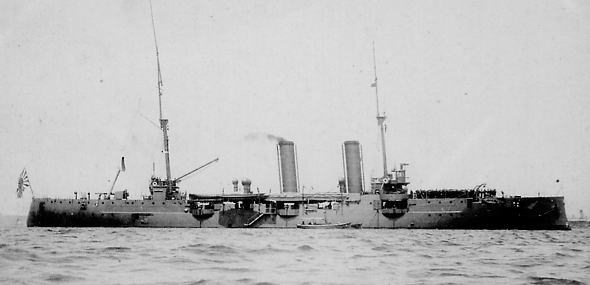
- Japanese cruiser Suma around 1905

Class overview
- Name: Suma class
- Builders: Yokosuka Shipyards, Japan
- Operators: Imperial Japanese Navy
- Preceded by: Akitsushima
- Succeeded by: Takasago
- Built: 1892–1899
- In commission: 1896–1930
- Completed: 2
- Retired: 2

General characteristics
- Type: Protected cruiser
- Displacement: 2,657 long tons (2,700 t)
- Length: 93.5 m (306 ft 9 in)
- Beam: 12.3 m (40 ft 4 in)
- Draught: 4.6 m (15 ft 1 in)
- Propulsion: 2-shaft VTE reciprocating engines; 8 boilers; 8,500 hp (6,300 kW)
- Speed: 20 knots (23 mph; 37 km/h)
- Range: 11,000 nmi (20,000 km) at 10 kn (19 km/h)
- Complement: 256
- Armament: 2 × QF 6 inch /40 naval guns; 6 × QF 4.7 inch Gun Mk I–IV; 10 × QF 6 pounder Hotchkiss guns; 4 × QF 3 pounder Hotchkiss guns; 4 × Maxim guns; 2 × 380 mm (15 in) torpedo tubes
- Armour: Deck: 50 mm (2 in) (slope), 25 mm (1 in) (flat); Gun shield: 115 mm (4.5 in) (front)

The two Suma-class cruisers (須磨型防護巡洋艦, Suma-gata bōgojun'yōkan) were protected cruisers operated by the Imperial Japanese Navy. While more lightly armed and armored than many of its contemporaries, their small size and relatively simple design facilitated their construction and their relatively high speed made them useful for many military operations. Both participated in combat during the Russo-Japanese War and World War I.

== Background ==
The Suma-class cruisers were designed and built in Japan at the Yokosuka Shipyards , as part of an Imperial Japanese Navy program to end its dependence on foreign powers for modern warships, using an all-Japanese design and all-Japanese materials. Although the Yokosuka Naval Arsenal had experience gained in the construction of the cruisers Hashidate and Akitsushima, albeit with assistance from French naval engineers and imported components, construction of Suma still took four years and resulted in a vessel with questionable stability and seaworthiness. However, her construction gave Japanese designers and shipbuilders valuable experience which was applied to her sister ship Akashi and which was applied in designs for larger and more powerful vessels in the future.

== Design ==
The overall dimensions and layout of armaments on the Suma-class cruisers was almost the same as on Akitsushima. The design incorporated an all-steel, double-bottomed hull, with an armored deck, divided underneath by watertight bulkheads. The armor, of the Harvey armor variety, covered only vital areas, such as the boilers, gun magazines and critical machinery, with a thickness of 25 millimetres (0.98 in) on the deck.

Her main battery consisted of two QF 6 inch /40 naval guns, one set in the forecastle and one in the stern. The main guns had a range of up to 9,100 metres (4.9 nmi) with a nominal firing rate of 5.7 shots/minute. Secondary armament consisted of six QF 4.7 inch Gun Mk I–IV mounted in sponsons on the upper deck. These guns had a range of up to 9,000 metres (9,800 yd) with a nominal firing rate of 12 shots/minute. She also had ten QF 3 pounder Hotchkiss guns, with a range of up to 6,000 metres (6,600 yd) with a nominal firing rate of 20 shots/minute, mounted four on the upper deck, two on the poop, two on the after bridge and one each on the bow and stern, as well as four 1-inch Nordenfelt gun, which was later replaced by four 7.62 mm Maxim machine guns. She also was equipped with two 356 mm (14.0 in) torpedoes, mounted on the deck .

The Suma-class cruisers were slightly smaller in displacement than Akitsushima, and consequently had lighter weaponry (two six-inch guns instead of four) to reduce issues with weight and design lessons learned with Akitsushima (such as the need to locate the secondary battery lower to the center of gravity to improve stability) were implemented. Nevertheless, as with most Japanese designs of the period, the design remained top-heavy and had issues with seaworthiness and stability.

The second ship of the class, Akashi differed from Suma in that its torpedo launch tubes were moved from the bow to the rear of the ship, and had a high foremast with a radio antenna. On Akashi the fighting top was eliminated from the mast from the start, resulting in a sleeker, "more modern" design. This was also eliminated from Suma at a later date.

Propulsion was by two vertical triple steam reciprocating engines, 2-shafts, with eight cylindrical boilers (on Suma, and nine single-ended boilers on Akashi) yielding a speed of 20 knots (37 km/h) and a range of 11,000 nautical miles (20,000 km) at 10 knots (19 km/h) based on its capacity for 544 tons of coal.

== Ships in class ==
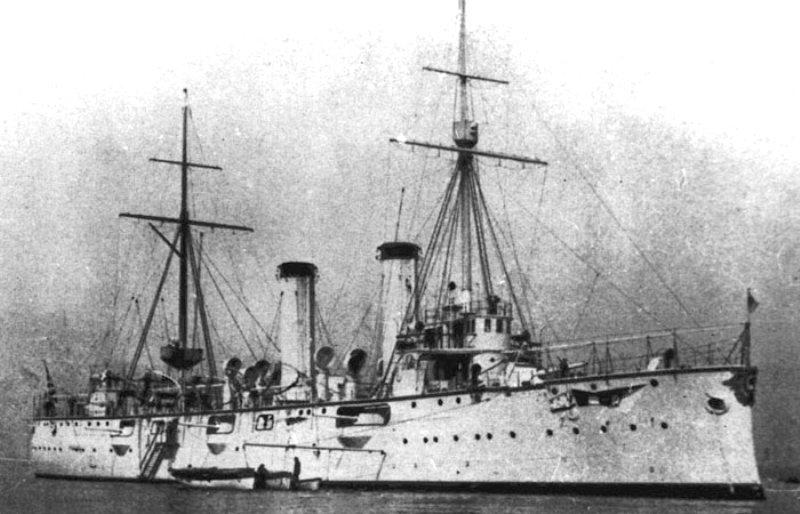
Japanese cruiser Akashi

Suma

Ordered in 1891, launched 9 March 1895, and completed 12 December 1896, Suma served in the Boxer Rebellion and in the Russo-Japanese War. She also served patrol duty during World War I primarily in the Southeast Asia theater. She was removed from the navy list on 4 April 1923, and scrapped in 1928.

Akashi

Ordered in 1893, launched 18 December 1897 and completed 30 March 1899, Akashi was plagued in its early career with numerous problems with its engines, especially its boilers. Once these issues were resolved, she served in the Boxer Rebellion and in the Russo-Japanese War. In World War I, Akashi served in the Battle of Tsingtao, and subsequently patrolled the sea lanes in Southeast Asia and the Mediterranean Sea. She was based out of Malta as flagship of a destroyer group as part of Japan's assistance to the Royal Navy under the Anglo-Japanese Alliance. She was expended as a target for dive bombers south of Izu Ōshima on 3 August 1930.
