= Japanese cruiser Suma =

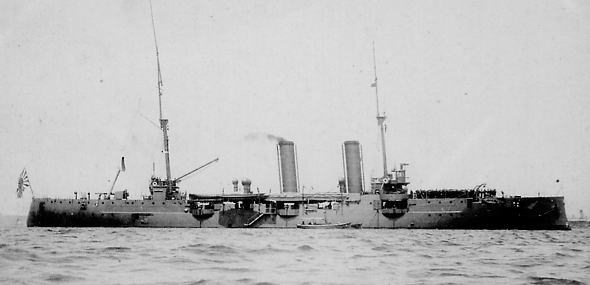
- Suma in 1894

History

Empire of Japan
- Name: Suma
- Namesake: Suma-ku, Kobe
- Ordered: 1891 Fiscal Year
- Builder: Yokosuka Naval Arsenal
- Laid down: 6 August 1892
- Launched: 9 March 1895
- Completed: 12 December 1896
- Stricken: 4 April 1923
- Fate: Scrapped 1928

General characteristics
- Class & type: Suma-class cruiser
- Displacement: 2,657 long tons (2,700 t)
- Length: 93.5 m (306 ft 9 in) w/l
- Beam: 12.3 m (40 ft 4 in)
- Draught: 4.6 m (15 ft 1 in)
- Propulsion: 2-shaft VTE reciprocating engines; 8 boilers; 6,250 hp (4,660 kW); 554 tons coal
- Speed: 20 knots (23 mph; 37 km/h)
- Range: 11,000 nmi (20,000 km) at 10 kn (19 km/h)
- Complement: 256
- Armament: 2 × QF 6 inch /40 naval guns; 6 × QF 4.7 inch Gun Mk I–IV; 12 × QF 3 pounder Hotchkiss guns; 4 × Maxim guns; 2 × 356 mm (14 in) torpedo tubes
- Armour: Deck: 50 mm (2 in) (slope), 25 mm (1 in) (flat); Gun shield: 115 mm (4.5 in) (front)

Suma (須磨) was a protected cruiser of the Imperial Japanese Navy, designed and built by the Yokosuka Naval Arsenal in Japan. She was the lead ship in the Suma-class cruiser, and her sister ship was Akashi. The name Suma comes from a geographic location near Kobe, in Hyōgo Prefecture.

== Background ==
Suma was designed and built at Yokosuka Naval Arsenal, as part of an Imperial Japanese Navy program to end its dependence on foreign powers for modern warships, using an all-Japanese design and all-Japanese materials. Construction took four years, from 1892 to 1896. She was laid down on 6 August 1892, launched on 9 March 1895 and commissioned on 12 December 1896. While more lightly armed and armored than many of the cruiser's contemporaries, her small size and relatively simple design facilitated the vessel's construction and her relatively high speed made the ship useful for many military operations. However, as with most Japanese designs of the period, she proved to be top-heavy and had issues with seaworthiness and stability.

== Design ==
The design for Suma was based on an all-steel, double-bottomed hull, with an armored deck, divided underneath by watertight bulkheads. The armor, of the Harvey armor variety, covered only vital areas, such as the boilers, gun magazines and critical machinery, with a thickness of 25 millimetres (0.98 in) on the deck.

Her main battery consisted of two QF 6 inch /40 naval guns, one set in the forecastle and one in the stern. The main guns had a range of up to 9,100 metres (4.9 nmi) with a nominal firing rate of 5.7 shots/minute. Secondary armament consisted of six QF 4.7-inch guns mounted in sponsons on the upper deck. These guns had a range of up to 9,000 metres (4.9 nmi) with a nominal firing rate of 12 shots/minute. She also had ten QF 3 pounder Hotchkiss guns, with a range of up to 6,000 metres (3.2 nmi) with a nominal firing rate of 20 shots/minute, mounted four on the upper deck, two on the poop, two on the after bridge and one each on the bow and stern, as well as four 1-inch Nordenfelt guns, which were later replaced by four 7.62 mm Maxim machine guns. She also was equipped with two 356 mm (14.0 in) torpedoes, mounted on the deck.

Her powerplant consisted of two vertical triple expansion steam engines, with eight cylindrical boilers in two boiler rooms separated by a watertight bulkhead .

When completed, the ship was found to have stability problems, and her fighting tops were later removed to lower her center of gravity.

== Service record ==
=== Early career ===
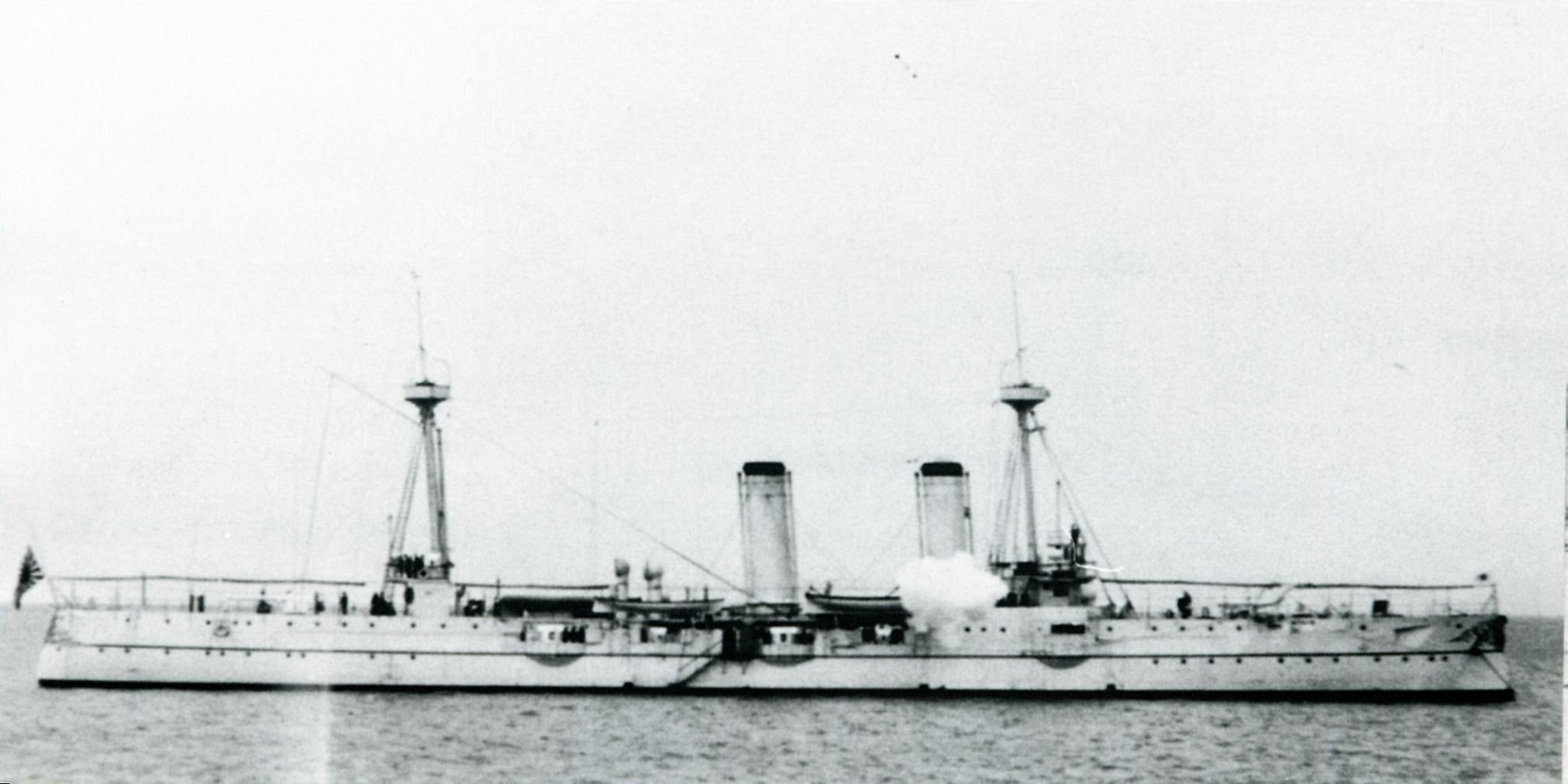
Suma off Kobe, 1897

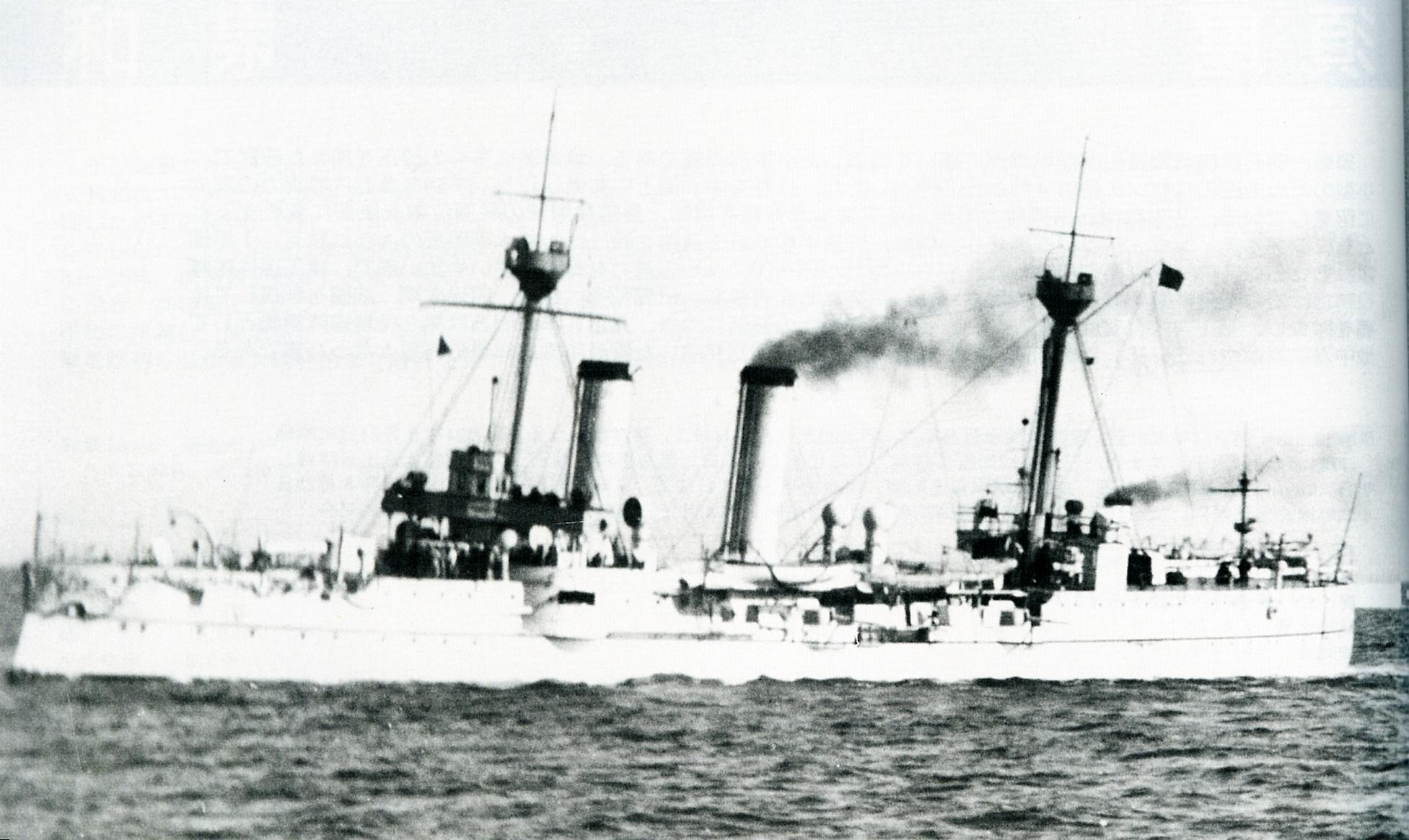
Suma off Osaka 1897

Completed too late for combat operations in the First Sino-Japanese War, the first overseas deployment of Suma was to Manila in the Philippines during the Spanish–American War, where she helped safeguard the interests and citizens of Japan during that conflict.

From June to July 1900, Suma was under the command of Commander Shimamura Hayao, and supported Japanese naval landing forces which occupied the port city of Tianjin in northern China during the Boxer Rebellion, as part of the Japanese contribution to the Eight-Nation Alliance.

=== Russo-Japanese War ===
At the start of the Russo-Japanese War of 1904–05, Suma was based out of the Takeshiki Guard District on the island of Tsushima from which the ship made patrols of the Korea Strait preventing any linkage between the Russian cruiser squadron based in Vladivostok and the main Russian Pacific Fleet based at Port Arthur.

On 18 February 1904, under the orders of Admiral Itō Sukeyuki, Suma arrived in Shanghai with the cruiser Akitsushima to compel the disarmament of the Russian gunboat Mandzhur, or the ship's destruction under the international norms for neutrality, accomplishing her mission by 31 March.

In early May, Suma covered landings by the Japanese Second Army in Manchuria, following which (on 15 May), she assisted in the rescue of survivors from the crew of the ill-fated battleships Hatsuse and Yashima after those ships struck naval mines off the coast of Port Arthur. She then joined the list of Japanese ships blockading the Russian naval base in the Battle of Port Arthur.

On 7 June, Suma, together with the gunboats Uji, cruiser Akashi and a detachment of destroyers entered the Gulf of Bohai to support the landings of elements of the Japanese Second Army, and later bombarded Russian shore installations and a railway line along the coast of Manchuria.

During the start of the Battle of the Yellow Sea, Suma had a mechanical failure, and was ordered to withdraw to join the 5th Division (consisting of the obsolete Matsushima, Hashidate and Saiyen, located to the north of the line of battle. However, when the Russian squadron unexpected turned back towards Port Arthur, Suma was cut off, but by coincidence was in the path of the fleeing cruisers Askold and Novik. Although exchanging some gunfire, Suma was unable to prevent the escape of the Russian ships. After the battle, Suma returned to the Japanese repair station in the Elliott Islands, and then rejoined the blockade of Port Arthur.

In February 1905, Suma provided escort to transports in the Sea of Japan, especially for the delivery of vitally needed artillery and reinforcements for the Imperial Japanese Army (IJA). During the Battle of Tsushima on 27 May 1905, Suma was flagship of the 6th Division under Rear Admiral Tōgō Masamichi. Together with Chiyoda, she was ordered to shadow the Russian fleet on its approach to the Tsushima Strait. During the first day of the battle, Suma and Chiyoda attacked on the left flank (southern portion) of the Russian formation, capturing transports and the hospital ships Orel and Kostroma. Later that day, Suma and Chiyoda attacked the cruisers Oleg, Aurora, Vladimir Monomakh and Dmitrii Donskoi and sinking the already damaged battleship Knyaz Suvorov and repair ship Kamchatka. During the battle, Suma took only small damage with three crewmen injured. The following day, 28 May, Suma reported the surrender of the remaining ships under the command of Rear Admiral Nikolai Nebogatov, and unsuccessfully pursued the cruiser Zhemchug, which managed to escape the battle.

Afterwards, Suma was assigned to the Japanese force, which seized Sakhalin from Russia, covering landings by the IJA 13th Division at several locations, and securing lighthouses and port facilities. In August, her reconnaissance parameters were expanded to include the southern coast of the Kamchatka Peninsula and the Commander Islands, and was dispatched to Petropavlovsk-Kamchatsky to rescue retired Lieutenant Shigetada Gunji, who had been arrested by Russian authorities for his unauthorized private invasion of Kamchatka. While in the area, Suma also captured the United States-flagged steamer Australia, which was found to be transporting war contraband.

=== Later career ===
Suma arrived in Yokohama to participate in a naval review celebrating the Japanese victory on 23 October 1905. She underwent overhaul in 1908, when her cylindrical boilers were replaced with Miyabara water-tube boilers. On 28 August 1912, Suma was downgraded to a 2nd class cruiser.

In 1916, during World War I, Suma was initially based at Manila, and assigned to patrol the sea lanes in the South China Sea and Sulu Sea from Borneo to the Malacca Straits against German commerce raiders and U-boats. She was later based in Singapore together with Yahagi, Niitaka and Tsushima and a flotilla of destroyers, and reassigned to provide coastal defense to Australia and New Zealand, as part of Japan's contribution to the Allied war effort under the Anglo-Japanese Alliance.

After the war, Suma was re-designated as a 2nd-class coastal defense vessel from 1 September 1921 . Suma was demilitarized per the Washington Naval Treaty and re-designated a utility vessel on 4 April 1923 and was removed from the active navy list. She continued to be used as a guard ship at Sasebo Naval District until being broken up for scrap in 1928.
