= Mikasa =

Mikasa (Japanese: 三笠) may refer to:

== Places ==
- Mikasa, Hokkaido, Japan
- Mikasa Park, in Yokosuka, Kanagawa, Japan
- Mount Wakakusa or Mount Mikasa, a mountain in Nara, Japan

== People ==
- The princely house of Mikasa-no-miya within the Imperial House of Japan:
  - Takahito, Prince Mikasa (1915–2016)
  - Yuriko, Princess Mikasa (1923–2024)
  - Prince Tomohito of Mikasa (1946–2012)
  - Princess Tomohito of Mikasa (born 1955)

=== Characters ===
- Mikasa Ackerman, a character in the manga series Attack on Titan and its anime adaptation.

== Other uses ==
- Mikasa River, a river of Ōnojō, Fukuoka Prefecture, Japan
- Mikasa Sports, a sporting goods manufacturer
- Japanese battleship Mikasa
- Mount Mikasa, in Nara, Nara Prefecture, Japan
- “Mikasa,” a song by progressive metal band Veil of Maya from their 2015 album Matriarch
- Dorayaki, a Japanese confection known as Mikasa in the Kansai region
- A family of AlphaServer computers

== See also ==
- Mi Casa, a house band
- Misaka, surname
- Misaka, Yamanashi, former town in Japan
