= Hayashi Misao =

Japanese noblewoman

Countess Hayashi Misao
- 林 操
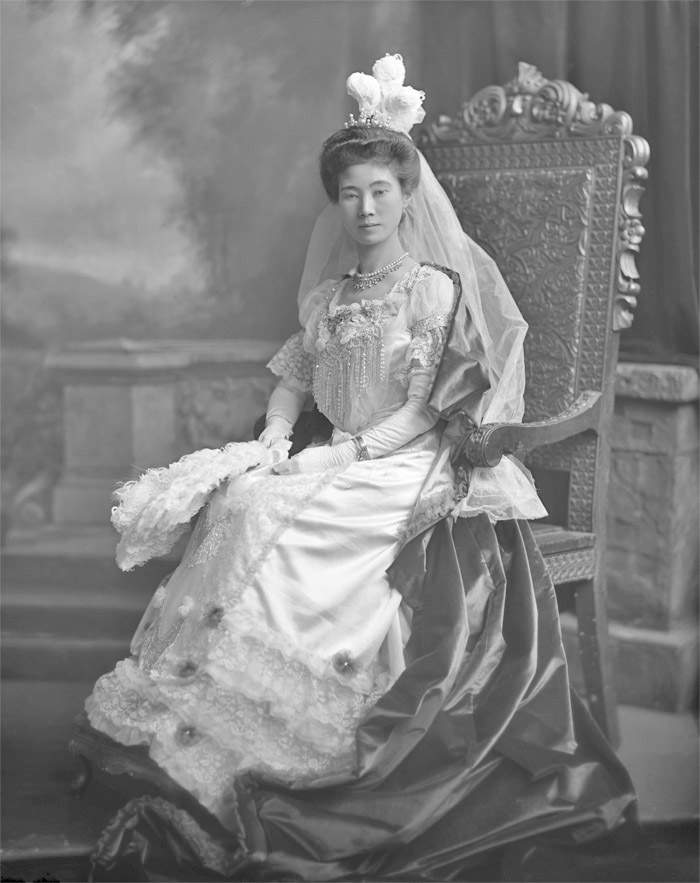
- Viscountess Hayashi, later Countess Hayashi, photographed in 1902
- Born: Gamo Misao; 1858; Edo, Japan
- Died: 1942 (aged 83–84)
- Occupation: noblewoman
- Spouse: Hayashi Tadasu (m. 1875; died 1913)
- Children: 2
- Father: Gamo Shigetami

Countess Hayashi Misao (林 操) (born Gamo Misao (蒲生 操); 1858 – 1942) was a Japanese noblewoman and wife of Hayashi Tadasu, the first Japanese ambassador in London.

== Early life ==
Gamo Misao was born in Edo, Japan as the fourth daughter of Gamo Shigetami and was later adopted by Yamanouchi Teiun.

== Diplomat's wife ==
In 1875 at the age of 17, she married diplomat Hayashi Tadasu (1850–1913). They had a daughter and a son, Kiku and Masanosuke. She was made a Baroness on 31 October 1895.

The couple moved to England in 1900 where her husband would serve as Japan's resident minister to Great Britain. From their home in Grosvenor Gardens in London, Baroness Hayashi hosted regular dinner and tea gatherings of the few other Japanese women living in the city, and enjoyed doing needlework. They would later help raise their granddaughter, Fukuzawa Sono.

On 8 November 1900, Hayashi launched the Japanese battleship Mikasa at its completion, from Barrow-in-Furness.

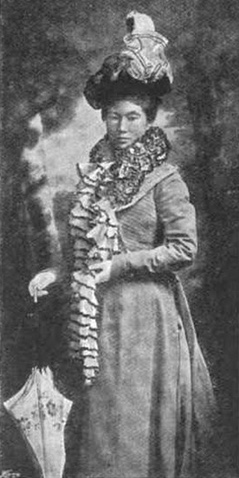
Baroness Hayashi, from a 1901 publication.

Baroness Hayashi fascinated the British press in her own right. Newspapers and magazines reported on her dress and her hospitality. "It is incongruous to think of this slim, erect, young-looking woman as a grandmother, but her grandchild lives at the legation in London with her," reported one magazine in 1901, adding that "Madame la Baronne dresses in very French style." Her recommendation that women learn jujutsu was widely reported. Her photograph was featured on a cigarette card during this time. She was made a Viscountess on 27 February 1902. Her husband later became the Japan's first ambassador to the Court of St. James on 2 December 1905.

She helped organize a relief fund for the widows and orphans of Japanese soldiers and sailors who died in the Russo-Japanese War. Baroness Hayashi and Tama Kurokawa wrote a joint letter of thanks to Anita Newcomb McGee for her efforts to organize American nurses to aid the Japanese Red Cross during that war. She was made a Countess on 14 September 1907.

== Later life ==
Hayashi Misao was widowed when Hayashi Tadasu died in 1913. She died in 1942, aged 84 years.
