= Hayashi Tadasu =

Japanese diplomat (1850–1913)

Junior Second Rank Count Hayashi Tadasu GCVO
- 林 董
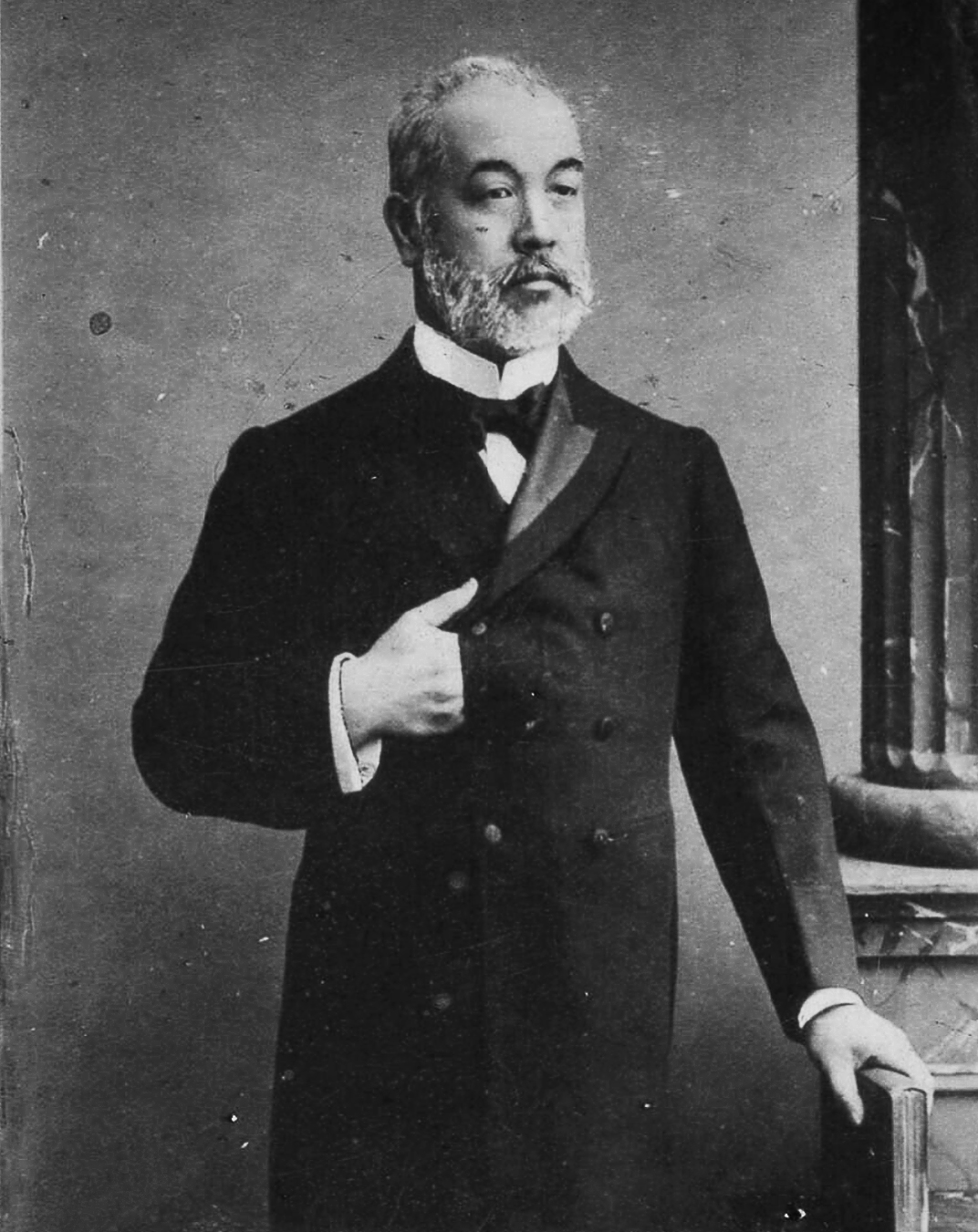
- Hayashi Tadasu c. 1902

Minister of Communications
- In office 30 August 1911 – 21 December 1912
- Prime Minister: Saionji Kinmochi
- Preceded by: Gotō Shinpei
- Succeeded by: Gotō Shinpei

Minister for Foreign Affairs
- In office 19 May 1906 – 14 July 1908
- Prime Minister: Saionji Kinmochi
- Preceded by: Saionji Kinmochi
- Succeeded by: Terauchi Masatake

Governor of Hyōgo Prefecture
- In office 26 December 1889 – 15 June 1891
- Monarch: Meiji
- Preceded by: Utsumi Tadakatsu
- Succeeded by: Sufu Kōhei

Governor of Kagawa Prefecture
- In office 3 December 1888 – 26 December 1889
- Monarch: Meiji
- Preceded by: Yoshio Nitta (1876)
- Succeeded by: Shibahara Yawara

Personal details
- Born: Satō Shingoro; 11 April 1850 Sakura, Shimōsa, Japan
- Died: 10 July 1913 (aged 63) Hayama, Kanagawa, Japan
- Resting place: Aoyama Cemetery
- Spouse: Hayashi Misao (m. 1875)
- Children: Fukuzawa Kiku (daughter); Hayashi Masanosuke (son)
- Parent(s): Satō Taizen (biological father); Hayashi Dokai (adoptive father)
- Relatives: Matsumoto Ryōjun (brother)
- Education: University College School
- Alma mater: King's College London
- Occupation: Diplomat, cabinet minister
- Other names: Satō Tosaburō

Count Hayashi Tadasu GCVO (林 董; 11 April 1850 – 10 July 1913) was a Japanese career diplomat and cabinet minister of Meiji-era Japan.

== Early life ==
He was born Satō Shingoro in Sakura city, Shimōsa Province (present-day Chiba prefecture), as the son of Satō Taizen, a physician practising "Dutch medicine" for the Sakura Domain. He sometimes referred to himself as "Satō Tosaburō". He was adopted as a child by Hayashi Dokai, a physician in the service of the Tokugawa shogunate, from whom he received the name Hayashi Tadasu. He learned English at the Hepburn Academy (the forerunner of Meiji Gakuin University) in Yokohama.

From 1866 to 1868, Hayashi studied in Great Britain at University College School and King's College London as one of fourteen young Japanese students (including Kikuchi Dairoku) sent by the Tokugawa government on the advice of the then British foreign minister Edward Stanley, 15th Earl of Derby.

Hayashi returned home in the midst of the Boshin War of the Meiji Restoration, and joined with Tokugawa loyalists led by Enomoto Takeaki, whom he accompanied to Hokkaidō with the remnants of the Shogunate Army and its Navy. He was captured by the Imperial forces after the final defeat of the Republic of Ezo at the Battle of Hakodate and imprisoned in Yokohama.

Released in 1871 by Kanagawa governor Mutsu Munemitsu, he was recruited to work for the Meiji government in 1871, and because of his language abilities and previous overseas experience was selected to accompany the Iwakura Mission to Europe and the United States in 1871–1873.

== Government officer ==
Being a member of the Iwakura Mission in Britain, he was instructed by Yamao Yozo to arrange appointment of the teaching staff for the Engineering Institution (Japan) in the end of 1872. He returned home with the staff led by Henry Dyer as the principal, and endeavoured to set up the Imperial College of Engineering, Tokyo as an officer of the Engineering Institution of the Ministry of Public Works.

== Political career ==
After the Ministry of Public Works was abolished, he moved to the Ministry of Post and Telecommunication, then was appointed governor of Kagawa Prefecture, and then of Hyōgo Prefecture. In 1891, he was appointed Vice-Minister for Foreign Affairs. He was elevated to the title of baron (danshaku) in the kazoku peerage in 1895.

Hayashi was appointed as resident minister to the court of Qing dynasty China at the Japanese legation in Beijing, then resident minister to Russia in St Petersburg, and finally resident minister to Great Britain. While serving in London from 1900, he worked to successfully conclude the Anglo-Japanese Alliance and signed on behalf of the government of Japan on 30 January 1902. He was elevated to the title of viscount (shishaku) in February 1902.

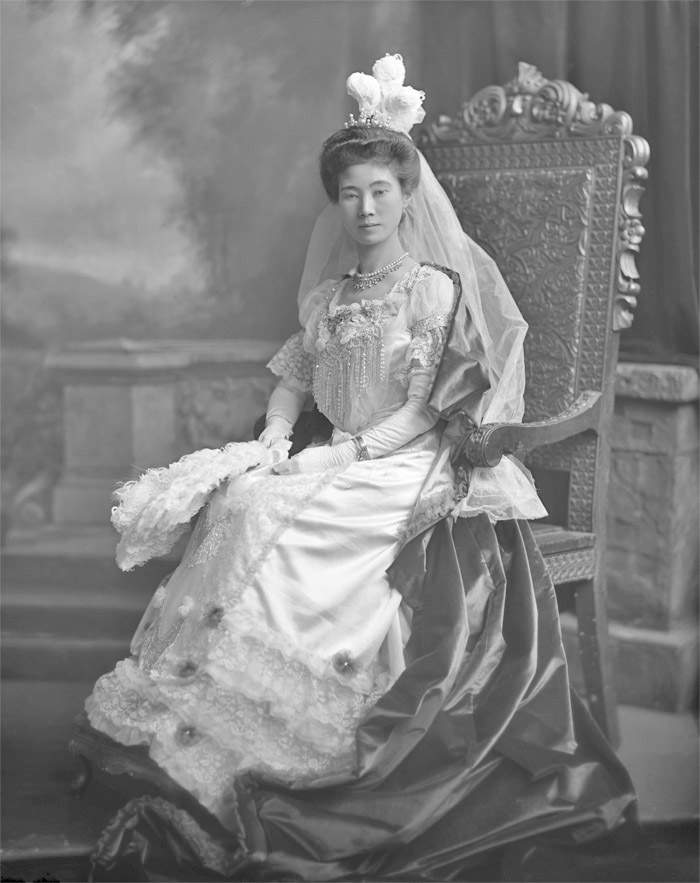
Countess Hayashi, photographed 17 March 1902

On 2 December 1905 Hayashi became the first Japanese ambassador to the Court of St James's, as diplomatic relations were upgraded between the Empire of Japan and the British Empire. He was accompanied by his wife. At that time Sir Claude MacDonald was Hayashi's opposite number in Tokyo.

On becoming Foreign Minister in the first Saionji cabinet in 1906, Hayashi concluded agreements with France (the Franco-Japanese Agreement of 1907) and Russia (the Russo-Japanese Agreement of 1907 and Russo-Japanese Agreement of 1910). He served as Minister of Communications in the second Saionji cabinet and as interim Foreign Minister (1911–12). He was elevated to the title of count (hakushaku) in 1907.

On contracting diabetes, Hayashi retired in 1912, and in June 1913 he fractured his thigh in an accident, resulting in an amputation. Hayashi died a month later, and his grave is at Aoyama Cemetery in Tokyo.

== Personal life ==
In 1875, he married Gamo Misao (1858–1942). They had a daughter and a son, Kiku and Masanosuke.

Hayashi became a master mason in 1904, initiated in 1903 in Empire Lodge No. 2108, in London. He resigned from the lodge in 1907.

== Honors ==
=== Titles ===
- Baron (31 October 1895)
- Viscount (27 February 1902)
- Count (14 September 1907)

=== Decorations ===
- Grand Cordon of the Order of the Sacred Treasure (31 October 1895)
- Grand Cordon of the Order of the Rising Sun (27 December 1899)
- Grand Cordon of the Order of the Rising Sun with Paulownia Flowers (1 April 1906)
- Knight Grand Cross of the Royal Victorian Order (GCVO) (4 July 1905)

=== Honorary degrees ===
- LL.D. (honorary) University of Cambridge – May 1902
- D.C.L. (honorary) University of Oxford – June 1902

=== Order of precedence ===
- Third rank (21 July 1901)
- Senior third rank (May 1910)

== See also ==
- Japan–United Kingdom relations
- Henry Petty-Fitzmaurice, 5th Marquess of Lansdowne – who signed the Anglo-Japanese alliance of 30 January 1902 for Britain when Hayashi signed for Japan
- Japanese students in the United Kingdom
- Kikuchi Dairoku
- Imperial Rescript on Education

== Notes ==
Political offices
Preceded by Saionji Kinmochi	Minister for Foreign Affairs; 1906–1908	Succeeded by Terauchi Masatake
Preceded by Gotō Shinpei	Minister of Communications; Aug 1911 – Dec 1912	Succeeded by Gotō Shinpei
