= Japanese battleship Mikasa =

Japanese pre-dreadnought battleship

Coordinates: 35.2851°N 139.6743°E

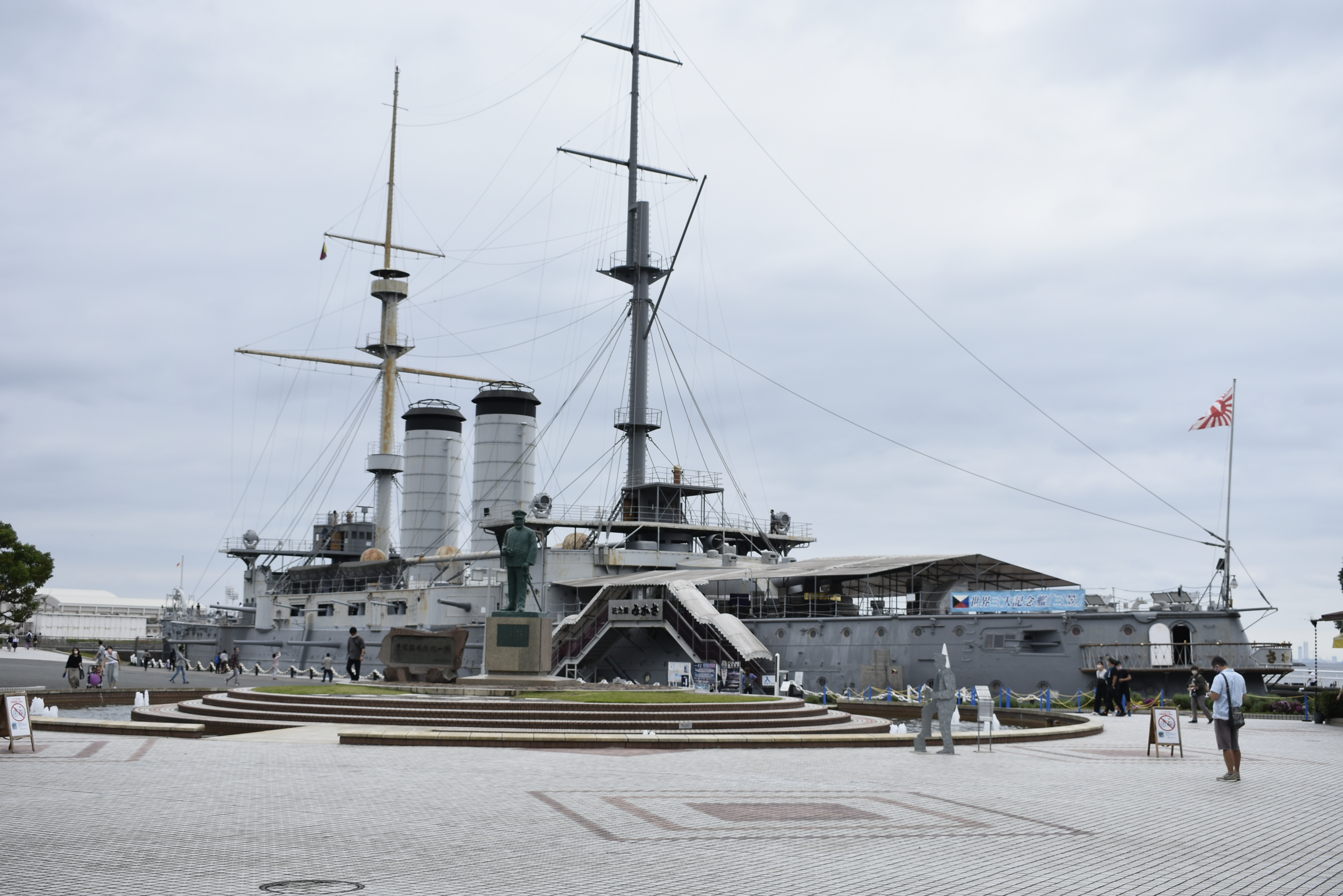
- Mikasa in Yokosuka, Japan, 2021

Class overview
- Operators: Imperial Japanese Navy
- Preceded by: Asahi
- Succeeded by: Katori class
- Built: 1899–1900
- In commission: 1902–1923
- Completed: 1
- Preserved: 1

History

Japan
- Name: Mikasa
- Namesake: Mount Mikasa
- Ordered: 26 September 1898
- Builder: Vickers, Sons & Maxim, Barrow-in-Furness
- Laid down: 24 January 1899
- Launched: 8 November 1900
- Sponsored by: Baroness Hayashi Misao
- Commissioned: 1 March 1902
- Stricken: 20 September 1923
- Status: Preserved as a memorial ship

General characteristics (as built)
- Type: Pre-dreadnought battleship
- Displacement: 15,140 long tons (15,380 t) (normal)
- Length: 432 ft (131.7 m)
- Beam: 76 ft (23.2 m)
- Draught: 27 ft (8.2 m)
- Installed power: 25 Belleville boilers; 15,000 ihp (11,000 kW)
- Propulsion: 2 shafts, 2 vertical triple-expansion steam engines
- Speed: 18 knots (33 km/h; 21 mph)
- Range: 9,000 nmi (17,000 km; 10,000 mi) at 10 knots (19 km/h; 12 mph)
- Complement: 836
- Armament: 2 × twin 12 in (305 mm) guns; 14 × single 6 in (152 mm) guns; 20 × single 12 pdr (3 in (76 mm)) guns; 8 × single 3 pdr guns (47 mm) guns; 4 × single 2.5 pdr (47 mm) guns; 4 × 18 in (450 mm) torpedo tubes
- Armour: Krupp cemented armour; Belt: 4–9 in (102–229 mm); Deck: 2–3 in (51–76 mm); Gun turrets: 8–10 in (203–254 mm); Barbettes: 8–14 in (203–356 mm); Conning tower: 4–14 in (102–356 mm); Casemates: 2–6 in (51–152 mm)

Mikasa (三笠) is a pre-dreadnought battleship built for the Imperial Japanese Navy (IJN) in the late 1890s, and is the only ship of her class. Named after Mount Mikasa in Nara, Japan, the ship served as the flagship of Vice Admiral Tōgō Heihachirō throughout the Russo-Japanese War of 1904–1905, including the Battle of Port Arthur on the second day of the war and the Battles of the Yellow Sea and Tsushima. Days after the end of the war, Mikasa's magazine accidentally exploded and sank the ship. She was salvaged and her repairs took over two years to complete. Afterwards, the ship served as a coast-defence ship during World War I and supported Japanese forces during the Siberian Intervention in the Russian Civil War.

After 1922, Mikasa was decommissioned in accordance with the Washington Naval Treaty and preserved as a museum ship at Yokosuka. She was badly neglected during the post-World War II Occupation of Japan and required extensive refurbishing in the late 1950s. She has been partially restored, and is now a museum ship located at Mikasa Park in Yokosuka. Mikasa is the last surviving example of a pre-dreadnought or of a non-American battleship anywhere in the world, and is also the last surviving example of a British-built battleship. (Note: The ironclad frigate Warrior was never officially rated as a battleship by the Royal Navy. The Greek Georgios Averof, while often referred to as a battleship, is in fact an armoured cruiser.)

== Background ==
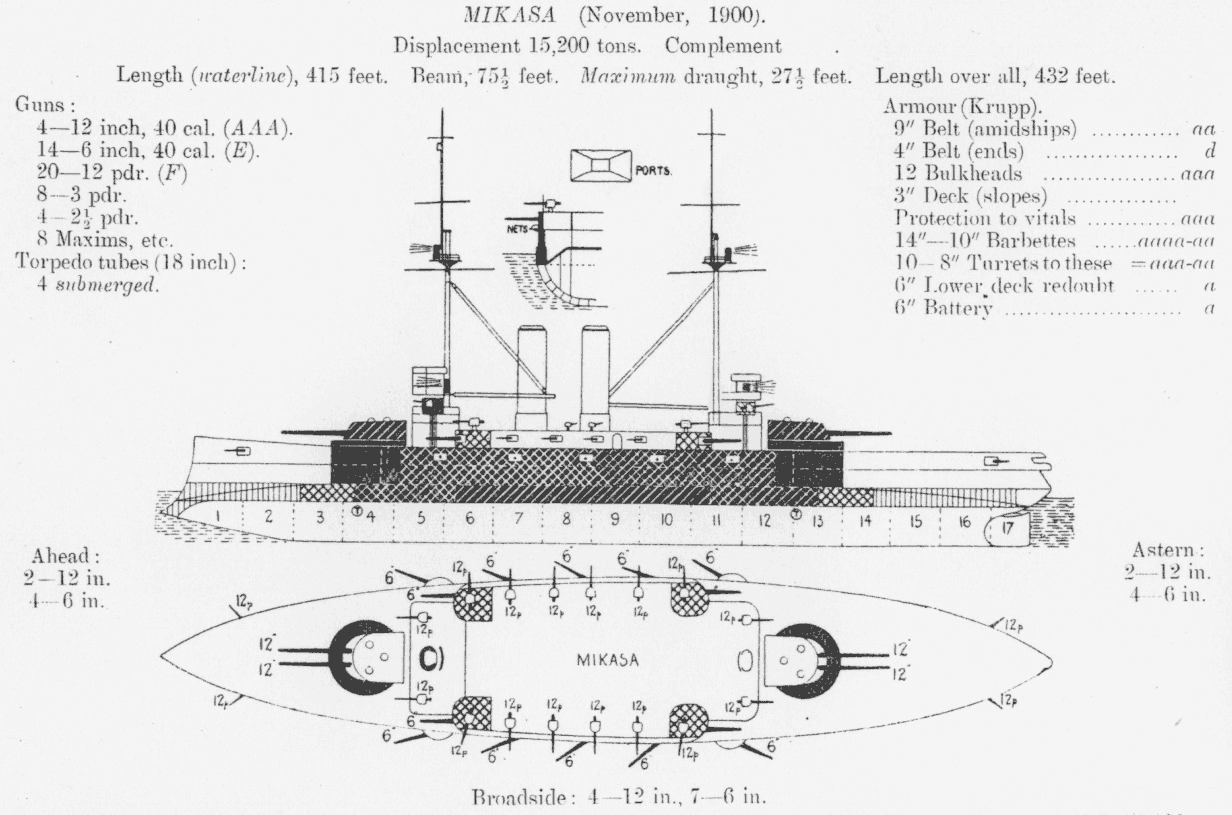
Plans showing Mikasa as originally built, from Jane's Fighting Ships 1906–07

The combat experience of the lightly armoured Matsushima-class cruisers during the First Sino-Japanese War of 1894–1895 convinced the Imperial Japanese Navy of weaknesses in the Jeune Ecole naval philosophy, and Japan embarked on a program to modernize and expand its fleet in preparation for further confrontations. In particular, Japan promulgated a ten-year naval build-up programme, with the construction of six battleships and six armoured cruisers at its core. These ships were paid for from the £30,000,000 indemnity paid by China after losing the First Sino-Japanese War.

As with the earlier Fuji and Shikishima-class battleships, Japan lacked the technology and capability to construct its own battleships, and turned again to the United Kingdom for the four remaining battleships of the programme. Mikasa, the last of these ships, was ordered from the Vickers shipyard in Barrow-in-Furness in 1898 at the cost of £880,000 (8.8 million yen at that time). Although she closely resembled several of the other ships ordered in this program, she was the only ship in her class.

== Design and description ==
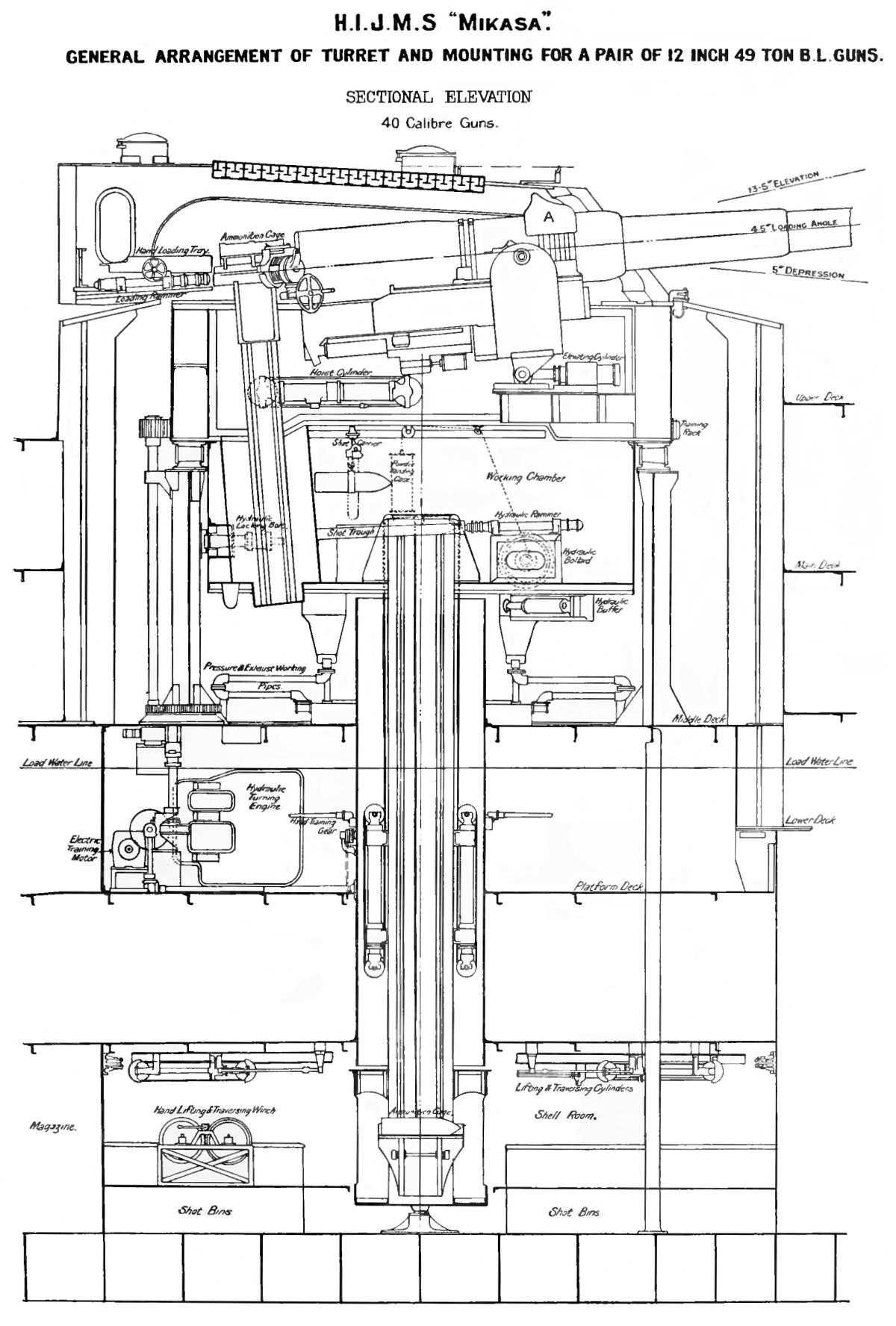
Turret layout for original 12-inch (305 mm) 40-calibre guns

The design of Mikasa was a modified version of the Formidable-class battleships of the Royal Navy with two additional 6-inch (152 mm) guns. Mikasa had an overall length of 432 feet (131.7 m), a beam of 76 feet (23.2 m), and a normal draught of 27 feet 2 inches (8.3 m). She displaced 15,140 long tons (15,380 t) at normal load. The crew numbered about 830 officers, petty officers and ratings.

The ship was powered by two vertical triple-expansion steam engines, each driving one propeller, using steam generated by 25 Belleville boilers. The engines were rated at 15,000 indicated horsepower (11,000 kW) using forced draught, and designed to reach a top speed of 18 knots (33 km/h; 21 mph) although Mikasa proved to be faster during her sea trials in December 1901, reaching 18.45 knots (34.17 km/h; 21.23 mph) from 16,341 indicated horsepower (12,185 kW). She carried a maximum of 2,000 long tons (2,000 t) of coal which allowed her to steam for 9,000 nautical miles (17,000 km; 10,000 mi) at a speed of 10 knots (19 km/h; 12 mph).

Mikasa's main battery consisted of the same four Elswick Ordnance Company 40-calibre twelve-inch guns used in all of the preceding Japanese battleships. They were mounted in twin-gun barbettes fore and aft of the superstructure which were additionally protected with armoured hoods, thus resembling true gun turrets. The hydraulically powered mountings could be loaded at all angles of traverse while the guns were loaded at a fixed angle of +13.5°. They fired 850-pound (386 kg) projectiles at a muzzle velocity of 2,400 ft/s (730 m/s).

The ship's secondary armament consisted of fourteen 40-calibre 6-inch (152 mm) quick-firing guns mounted in casemates. Ten of these guns were positioned on the main deck and the other four guns were placed above them at the corners of the superstructure. They fired 100-pound (45 kg) shells at a muzzle velocity of 2,300 ft/s (700 m/s). Protection against torpedo boat attacks was provided by twenty QF 12-pounder 12 cwt (Note: "cwt" is the abbreviation for hundredweight, 12 cwt referring to the weight of the gun.) guns. The 12-pounders fired 3-inch (76 mm), 12.5-pound (5.7 kg) projectiles at a muzzle velocity of 2,359 ft/s (719 m/s). Lighter guns consisted of eight 47-millimetre (1.9 in) three-pounder Hotchkiss guns and four 47-millimetre 2.5-pounder Hotchkiss guns. The three-pounder gun fired 3.19-pound (1.45 kg) projectiles at a muzzle velocity of 1,927 ft/s (587 m/s) while the 2.5-pounder fired 2.5-pound (1.1 kg) shells at a muzzle velocity of 1,420 ft/s (430 m/s). The ship was also equipped with four submerged 18-inch (450 mm) torpedo tubes, two on each broadside.

The waterline armour belt of Mikasa consisted of Krupp cemented armour that had a maximum thickness of 9 inches (229 mm) over the middle of the ship. It was only 4 inches (102 mm) thick at the ends of the ship and was surmounted by a six-inch strake of armour that ran between the barbettes. The barbettes were 14 inches (356 mm) thick, but reduced to six inches at the level of the lower deck. The armour of the barbette hoods had a thickness of 8–10 inches (203–254 mm). The casemates protecting the secondary armament were 2–6 inches (51–152 mm) thick and the deck armour was 2–3 inches (51–76 mm) in thickness. The forward conning tower was protected by 14 inches of armour, but the aft conning tower only had four inches of armour.

Mikasa, like all the other Japanese battleships of the time, was fitted with four Barr & Stroud FA3 coincidence rangefinders that had an effective range of 7,300 metres (8,000 yd). In addition the ships were also fitted with 24-power magnification telescopic gunsights.

== Construction and career ==
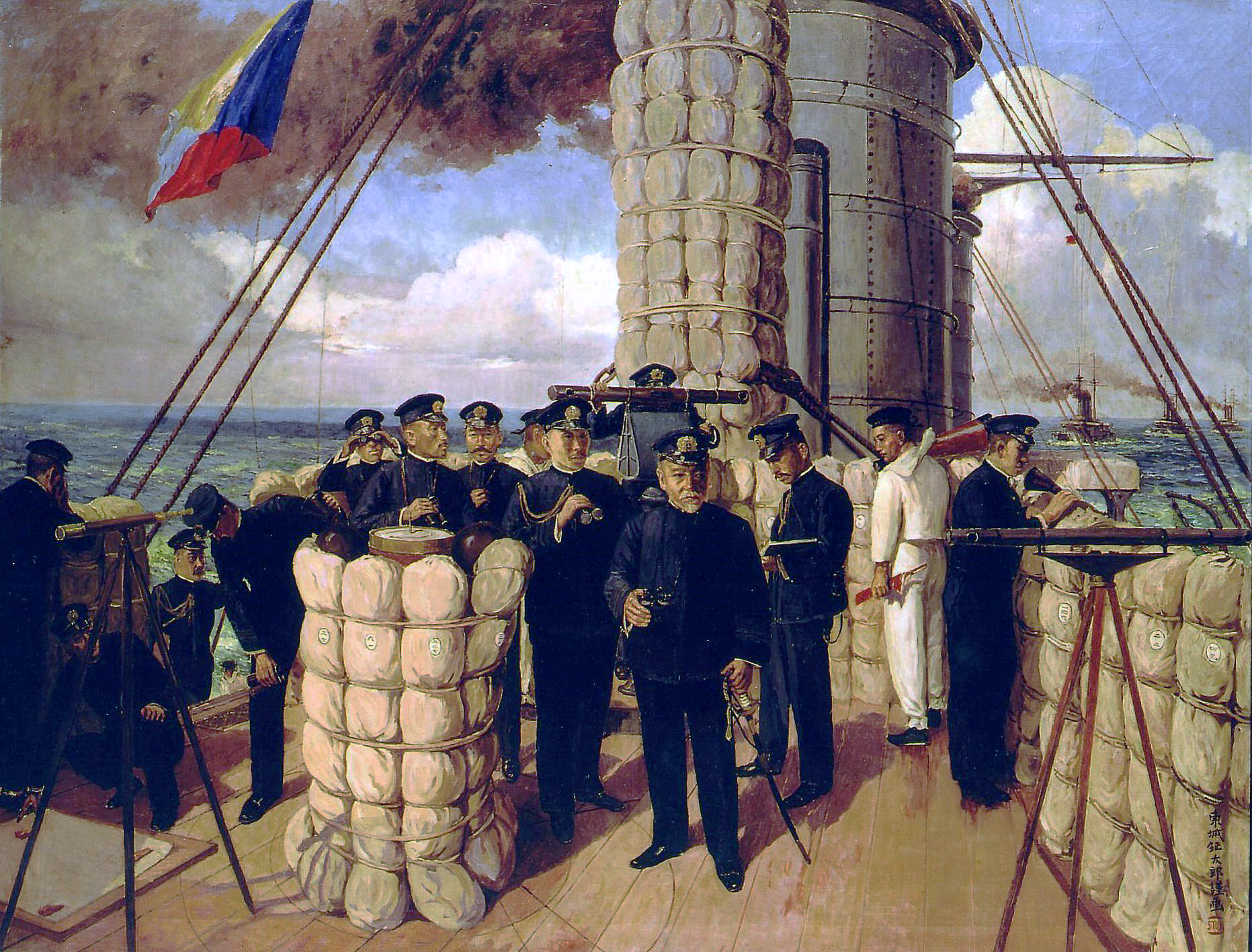
Admiral Tōgō on the "Compass Deck" above the bridge of Mikasa, before the Battle of Tsushima in 1905. The Z flag, Tōgō's special instruction to the fleet, is being hoisted. (Note: This painting shows Tōgō wearing a sword. In reality, it was prohibited for any officer to wear a sword on this deck for its effect on compass reading. The cushion-like coverings on the compass turret, side railings, and the mast are rolled sailor hammocks as a part of the "prepare for battle" procedure to reduce the risk of shrapnel.)

Mikasa, named after Mount Mikasa, was laid down by Vickers at their Barrow-in-Furness shipyard on 24 January 1899. Baroness (later Countess) Hayashi, the wife of the then resident minister to Great Britain (later Ambassador), served as Mikasa's sponsor, launching the hull on a rainy, but otherwise perfect ceremony on 8 November 1900. She would be completed on 1 March 1902, and after a visit to Devonport, she left Plymouth on 13 March, bound for Yokohama, under the command of Captain Hayasaki.

At the start of the Russo-Japanese War, Mikasa, commanded by Captain Hikojirō Ijichi, was assigned to the 1st Division of the 1st Fleet. She participated in the Battle of Port Arthur on 9 February 1904 when Admiral Tōgō Heihachirō led the 1st Fleet in an attack on the Russian ships of the Pacific Squadron anchored just outside Port Arthur. Tōgō had expected his surprise night attack on the Russians by his destroyers to be much more successful than it actually was and expected to find them badly disorganized and weakened, but the Russians had recovered from their surprise and were ready for his attack. The Japanese ships were spotted by the cruiser Boyarin which was patrolling offshore and alerted the Russian defences. Tōgō chose to attack the Russian coastal defences with his main armament and engage the Russian ships with his secondary guns. Splitting his fire proved to be a bad idea as the Japanese 8-inch (203 mm) and six-inch guns inflicted very little significant damage on the Russian ships who concentrated all their fire on the Japanese ships with some effect. Although a large number of ships on both sides were hit, Russian casualties numbered only 17 while the Japanese suffered 60 killed and wounded before Tōgō disengaged. Mikasa was hit by two ten-inch shells during the engagement that wounded seven crewmen.

The ship participated in the action of 13 April when Tōgō successfully lured out a portion of the Pacific Squadron, including Vice Admiral Stepan Makarov's flagship, the battleship Petropavlovsk. When Makarov spotted the five battleships of the 1st Division, he turned back for Port Arthur and Petropavlovsk struck a minefield laid by the Japanese the previous night. The Russian battleship sank in less than two minutes after one of her magazines exploded, and Makarov was one of the 677 killed. Emboldened by his success, Tōgō resumed long-range bombardment missions, which prompted the Russians to lay more minefields which sank two Japanese battleships the following month.

During the Battle of the Yellow Sea on 10 August, Mikasa was at the head of the column of Japanese battleships and was one of the primary targets of the Russian ships. She was hit twenty times, two of which knocked out her aft 12-inch gun turret, and suffered 125 casualties among her crew. In turn, she concentrated most of her fire upon the battleships Poltava and Tsesarevich although both ships were only lightly damaged by the Japanese shells which generally failed to penetrate any armour and detonated on impact.

=== Battle of Tsushima ===
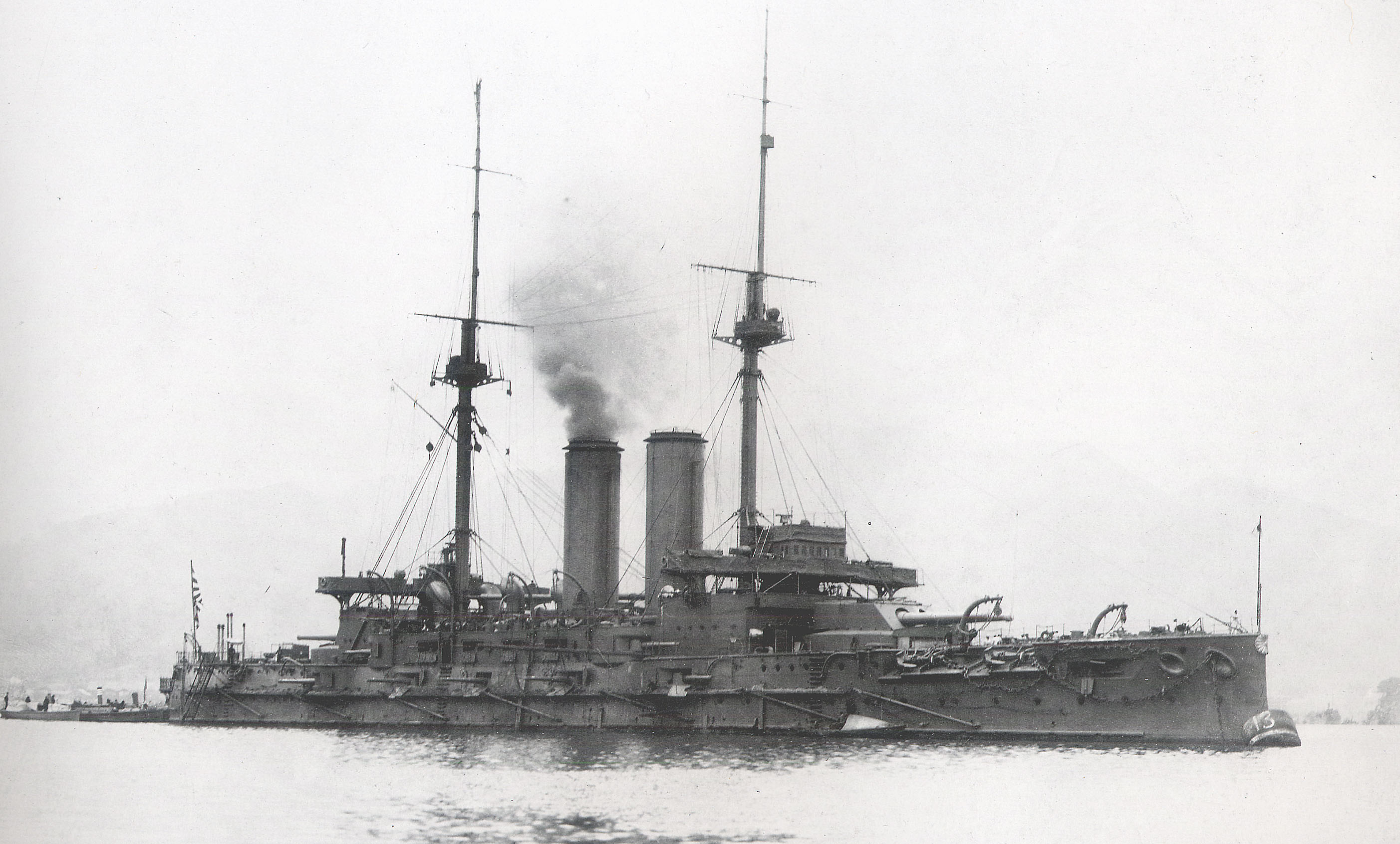
Mikasa as she appeared in 1905

At the Battle of Tsushima on 27 May 1905, Mikasa again led the 1st Fleet into combat, this time against the Second and Third Pacific Squadrons detached from the Baltic Fleet. The ship opened fire at the battleship Knyaz Suvorov, the Russian flagship, at 14:10, and was joined by the battleship Asahi and the armoured cruiser Azuma shortly afterwards. Within an hour the Japanese ships had started a serious fire aboard the Russian ship, badly wounded the fleet commander, Vice Admiral Zinovy Rozhestvensky, knocked out her rear twelve-inch gun turret, and jammed Knyaz Suvorov's steering so that she fell out of formation. During this time, Mikasa was the focus of the Russian fire as the leading ship in the Japanese column and was hit by 6 twelve-inch and 19 six-inch shells. They did very little damage and Tōgō was able to cross the T of the Russian squadrons. Knyaz Suvorov's steering was later repaired, but she blundered between the Japanese and Russian fleets several times later in the battle and Mikasa fired three torpedoes at her to no avail. Later in the battle, the ship appears to have fired mostly on the battleship Borodino although Fuji fired the shots that caused the Russian ship's magazines to explode and sink her. At 18:04, a twelve-inch shell detonated prematurely in the barrel of the right gun of the forward turret, disabling the gun and knocking out the left gun until 18:40. Another twelve-inch shell had exploded in that same barrel almost two hours earlier, but had not damaged the gun. One six-inch gun jammed after firing 19 rounds, but the only other damage to any of the ship's guns was one six-inch gun that was disabled by a Russian shell of the same size that entered through the gun port. She fired 124 twelve-inch shells during the battle, more than any other ship except Asahi's 142. In total, Mikasa was hit more than 40 times during the battle, including 10 twelve-inch and 22 six-inch shells, but none of them seriously damaged her. While Mikasa suffered 113 personnel casualties, the entire Japanese force combined only lost 117 men killed and 583 wounded to all causes during the battle.

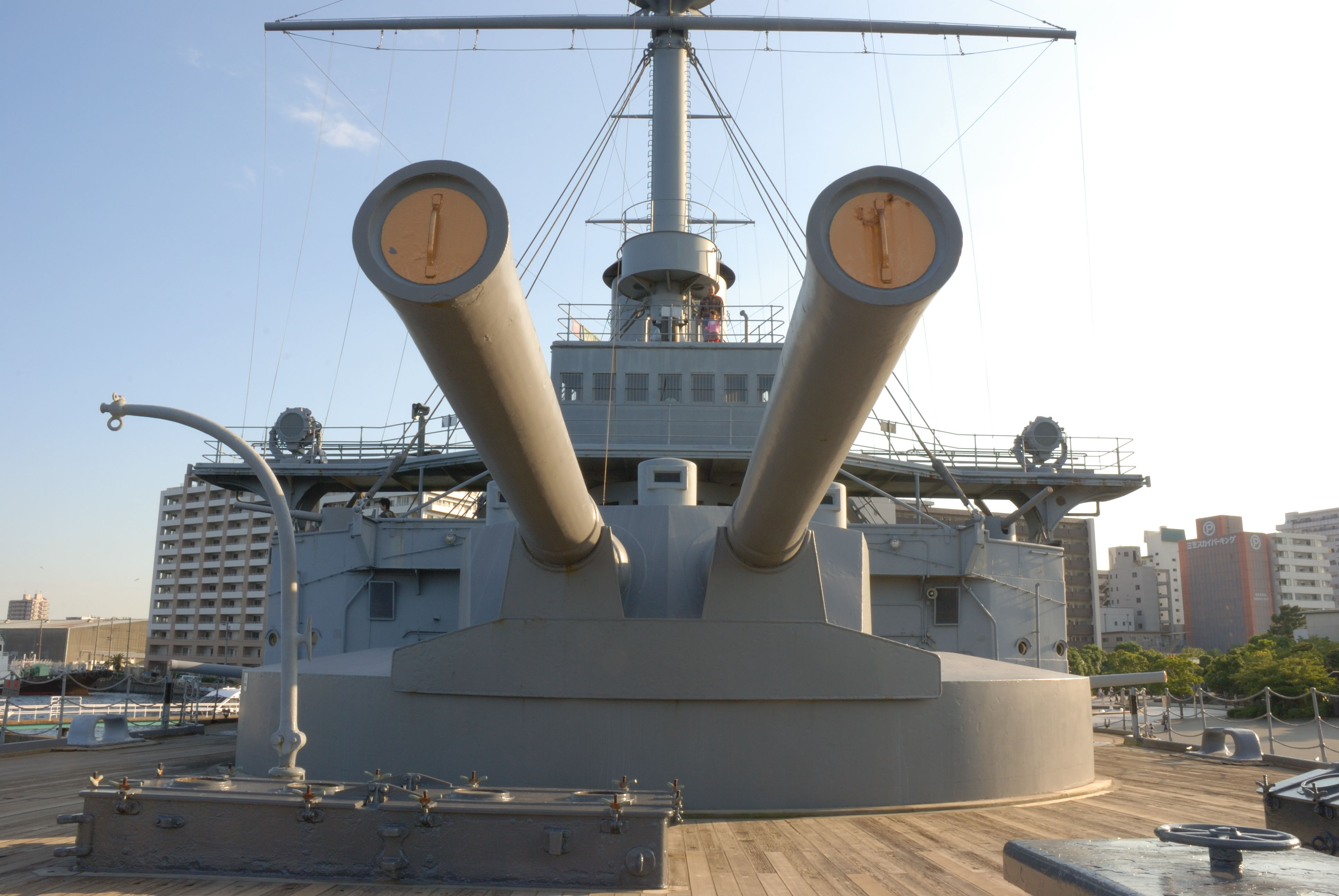
The new 45-calibre 12-inch guns added during the reconstruction

Six days after the Treaty of Portsmouth that ended the war was signed, Mikasa sank at her moorings after a fire and magazine explosion at Sasebo on the night of 11/12 September 1905 that killed 251 crewmen. She was refloated on 7 August 1906, reconstructed and repaired at Sasebo Naval Arsenal. The navy took the opportunity to upgrade her existing armament with more powerful 45-calibre twelve-inch and six-inch guns during the two years it took to repair the ship. Mikasa was restored to active service on 24 August 1908. In 1912, Mikasa came extremely close to suffering another main magazine detonation, when a suicidal sailor attempted to blow her up at anchor near Kobe. During World War I, she served on coast-defence duties, based at Maizuru, during 1914–15 and was then assigned to the Second and Fifth Squadrons, in that order, for the rest of the war. The ship supported the Japanese intervention in Siberia during the Russian Civil War during 1921 and was reclassified on 1 September 1921 as a first-class coast-defence ship. On 17 September, Mikasa ran aground near Askold Island off Vladivostok, but was not seriously damaged.

=== Preservation ===
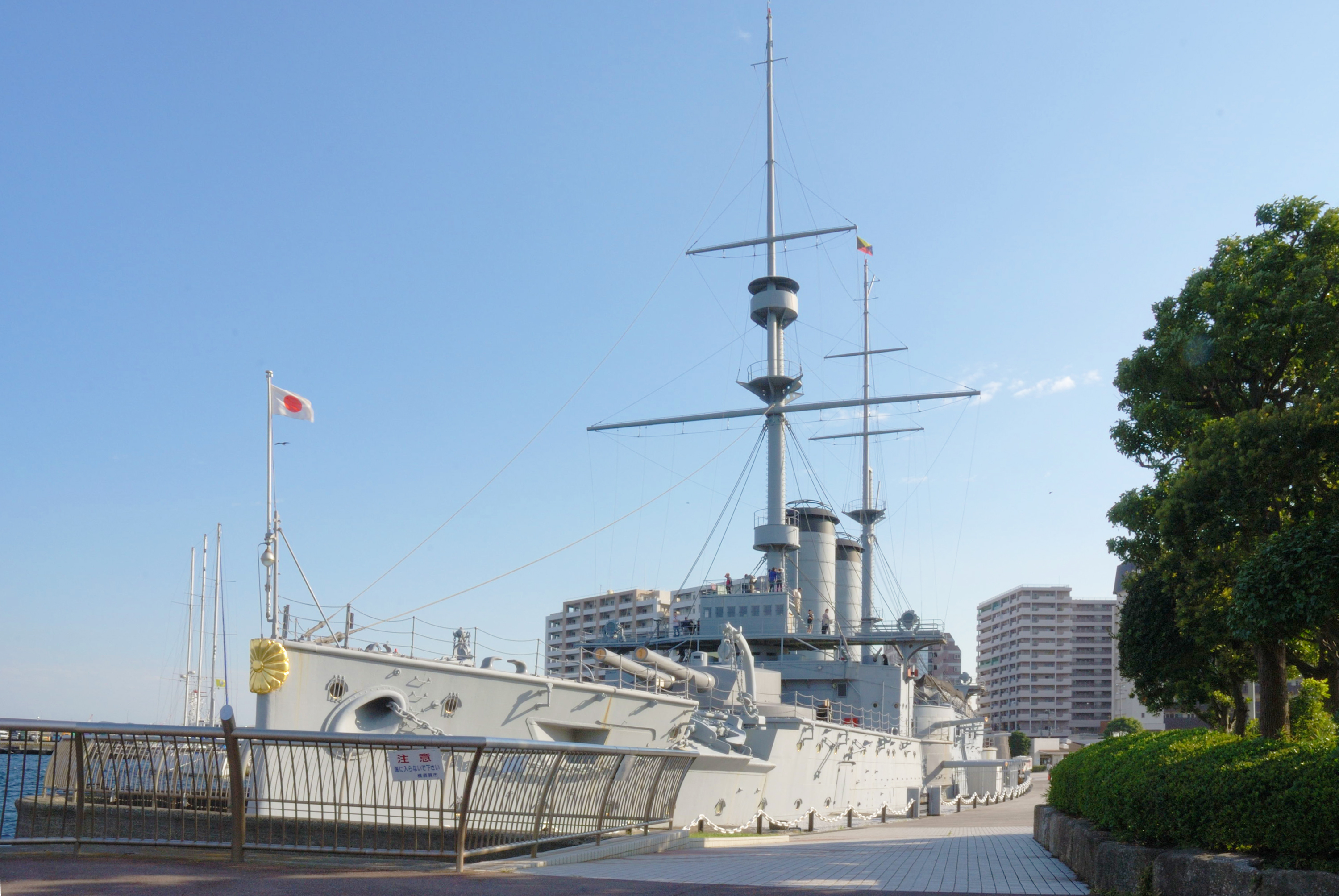
Battleship Mikasa as a museum ship in Yokosuka

The ship was decommissioned on 23 September 1923 following the Washington Naval Treaty of 1922 and scheduled for scrapping. However, at the request of the Japanese government, each of the signatory countries to the treaty agreed that Mikasa could be preserved as a memorial ship with her hull encased in concrete. All of her engines and guns were removed. On 12 November 1926, Mikasa was opened for display in Yokosuka in the presence of Crown Prince Hirohito and Tōgō.

Following the surrender of Japan in 1945, the ship deteriorated under control of the occupation forces. Mikasa had been heavily damaged by U.S. bombers during World War II and after the war American troops removed her superstructure, added a Quonset hut on her deck, and turned the remaining wreckage of Mikasa into an aquarium and "Club Mikasa", a nightclub for American servicemen. When the Japanese and Americans later restored Mikasa in the 1950s they were able to retrieve some of the removed superstructure for restoration. However, the majority of the Mikasa museum ship's superstructure was sourced from cannibalized sections of the decommissioned Chilean dreadnought battleship Almirante Latorre and, possibly, the Argentine Moreno. In 1955, American businessman John Rubin, formerly of Barrow, England, wrote a letter to the Japan Times about the state of the ship, which was the catalyst for a new restoration campaign. With the support of the Japanese public, and also Fleet Admiral Chester W. Nimitz, the restored battleship reopened in 1961. On 5 August 2009, Mikasa was repainted by sailors from USS Nimitz. Mikasa is the only surviving example of a pre-dreadnought battleship in the world, although all of the guns and turrets on Mikasa are replicas.

Mikasa is remembered in Barrow-in-Furness, the town of her construction, by Mikasa Street on Walney Island.

== See also ==
- Russian cruiser Aurora, a surviving Russian warship of the Battle of Tsushima
- USS Olympia, a U.S. Navy protected cruiser preserved in Philadelphia
- USS Texas, sole surviving dreadnought battleship
- Greek cruiser Georgios Averof, the only armored cruiser still afloat
