= Nara Park =

Public park in Nara, Japan

Coordinates: 34.685°N 135.85°E

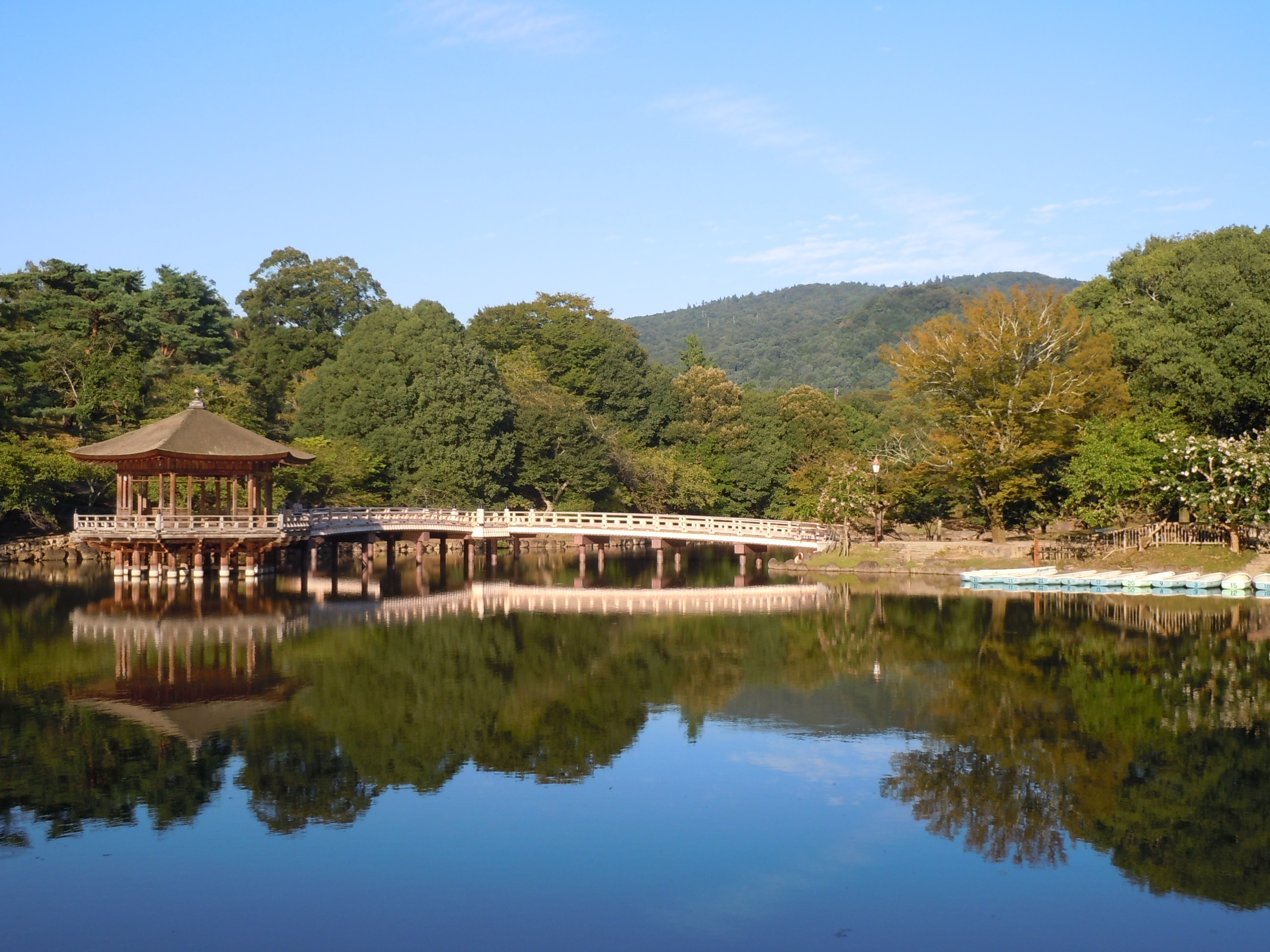
Pond in Nara Park

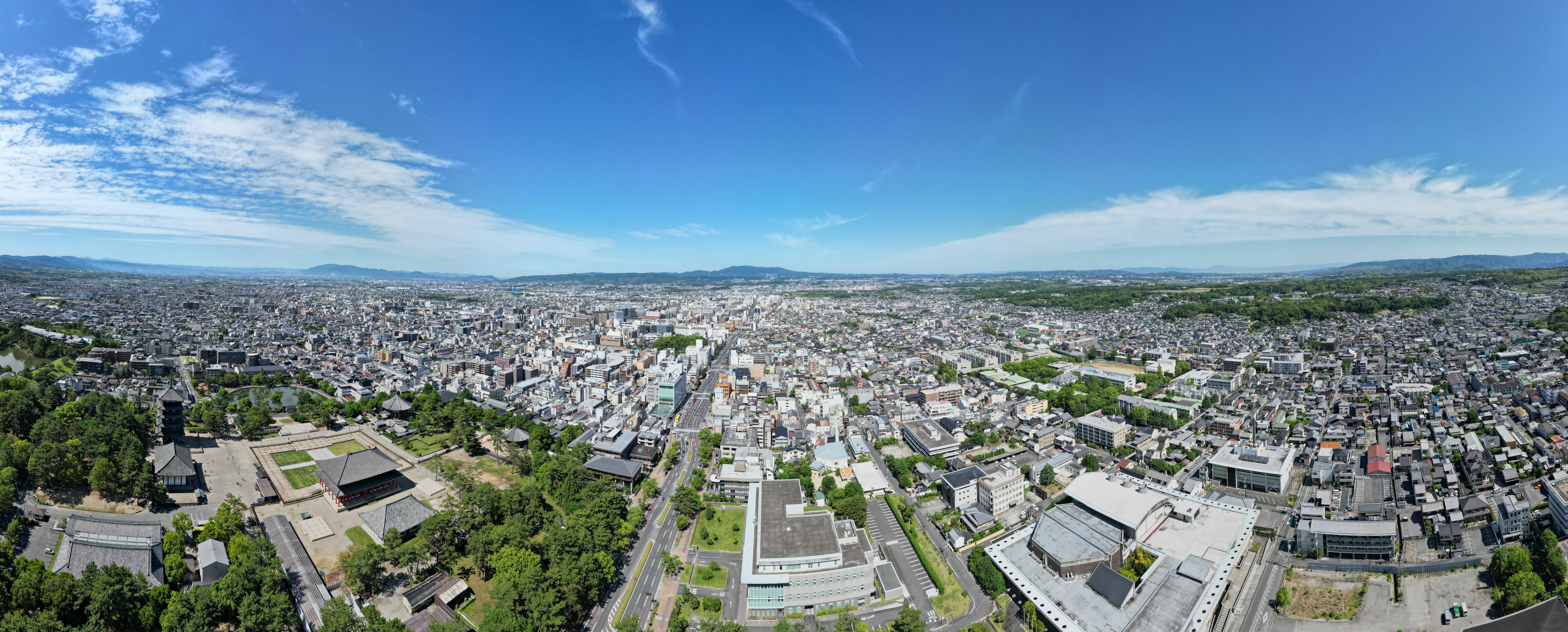
Aerial panorama of Nara Park

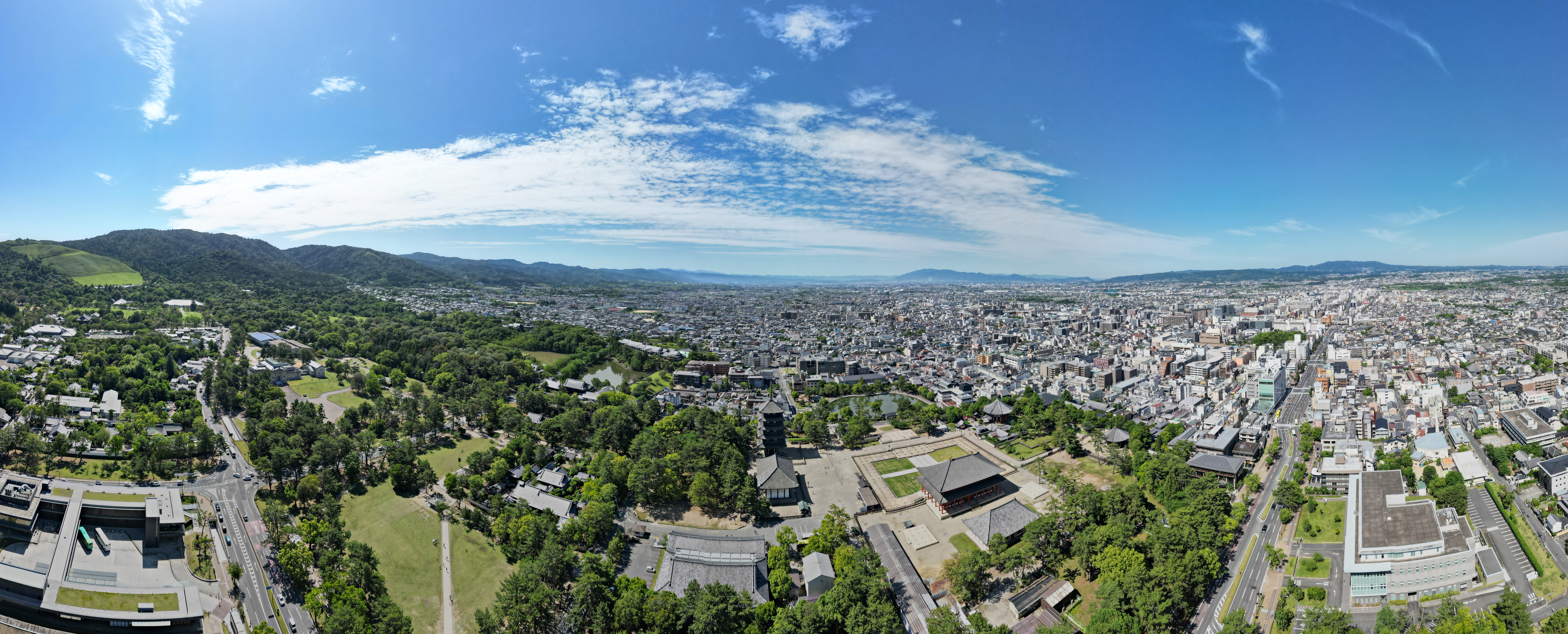
Another aerial perspective of Nara Park

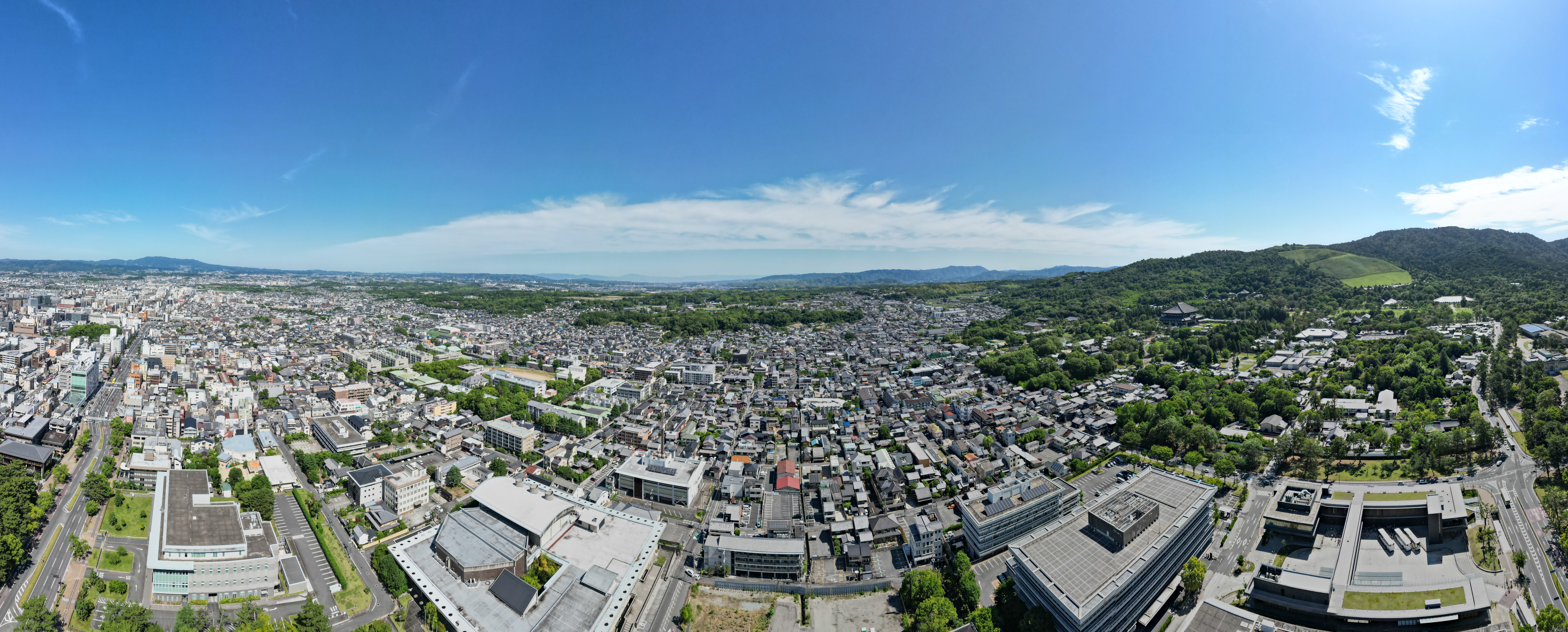
Aerial panorama of Nara Park facing the old town

Nara Park (Japanese: 奈良公園, Hepburn: Nara Kōen) is a public park located in the city of Nara, Japan, at the foot of Mount Wakakusa. Established in 1880, it is one of the oldest parks in Japan. Administratively, the park is under the control of Nara Prefecture. The park is one of the "Places of Scenic Beauty" designated by the Ministry of Education, Culture, Sports, Science and Technology (MEXT). Over 1,200 wild sika deer (シカ or 鹿 shika) freely roaming around in the park are also under designation of MEXT, classified as natural treasure. While the official size of the park is about 502 hectares (1,240 acres), the area including the grounds of Tōdai-ji, Kōfuku-ji, Kasuga Grand Shrine and Nara National Museum, which are either on the edge or surrounded by Nara Park, is as large as 660 hectares (1,600 acres).

Nara Park began in 1880, when a 14-hectare area within the grounds of Kōfuku-ji, which was government-owned land, was designated as a park. In 1889, Todai-ji, Kasugano and mountainous areas such as Mount Wakakusa were added, expanding the park to 535 hectares. From 1949 to 1951, the park designation within the temple grounds was revoked, reducing the area to 500 hectares. In 1960, it was officially designated as Nara Park under the Urban Park Act, with an area of 502 hectares.

The wild animals that inhabit the park include sika deer, wild boar, Japanese raccoon dogs, Japanese giant flying squirrels and Japanese squirrels, among others. The vegetation consists of pine trees, cherry blossom trees, maple trees, plum trees, Japanese cedar and Japanese pieris, among others.

== World Heritage Sites, National Treasures and Important Cultural Properties ==
The Nara Prefectural Government considers the total area of the Nara Park to be not only the designated area of 502 hectares defined by the Urban Park Act, but also the surrounding Shinto shrines, Buddhist temples, and other areas totaling 660 hectares. Within this 660-hectare area, there are World Heritage Sites, as well as a variety of National Treasures, Important Cultural Properties, and Natural Monuments (ja:天然記念物, Tennen Kinenbutsu) designated by the Japanese government. Todai-ji, Kofuku-ji, Kasuga Grand Shrine, and the Kasugayama Primeval Forest are registered as World Heritage Sites under the title Historic Monuments of Ancient Nara. There are 47 buildings designated as National Treasures and Important Cultural Properties on the grounds of Todai-ji, Kofuku-ji, Kasuga Grand Shrine, Shōsōin, Shin-Yakushi-ji, Gangō-ji, and others. There are 374 arts and crafts designated as National Treasures and Important Cultural Properties, mainly consisting of Buddhist statues and religious arts and crafts found in Buddhist temples and Shinto shrines. The Kasugayama Primeval Forest is designated as a Special Natural Monument (Tokubetsu Tennen Kinenbutsu), while the deer, the habitat of the Panchala ganesa butterfly, the Nageia nagi tree forest of Kasuga Grand Shrine, and the Prunus verecunda 'Antiqua' tree of Chisokuin are designated as Natural Monuments.

== Deer ==
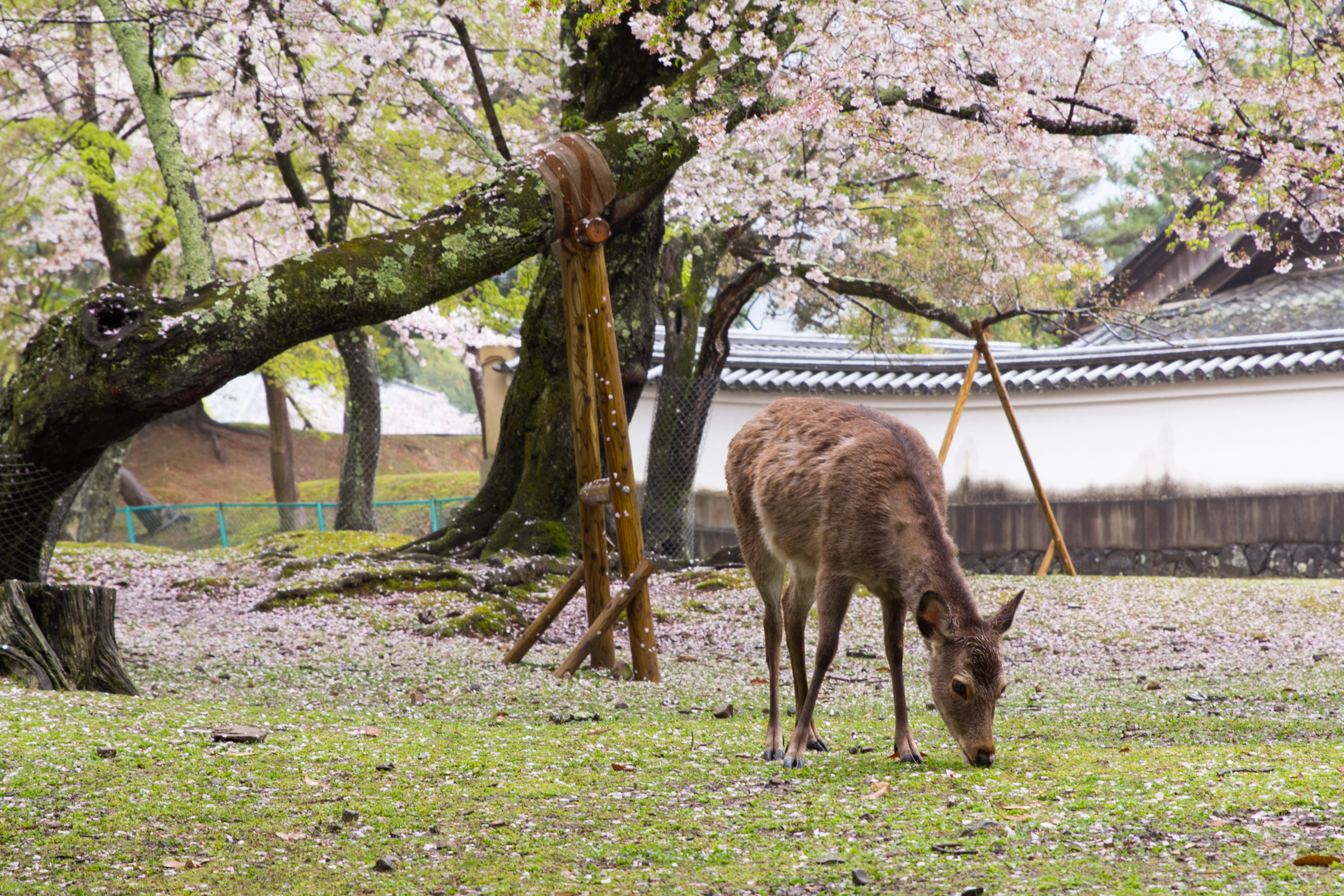
Sika deer in Nara Park

According to local folklore, sika deer from this area were considered sacred due to a visit from Takemikazuchi, one of the four gods of Kasuga Grand Shrine. He was said to have been invited from Kashima Shrine in present-day Ibaraki Prefecture, and appeared on Mount Mikasa (also known as Mount Wakakusa) riding a white deer. From that point, the deer were considered divine and sacred by both Kasuga Grand Shrine and Kōfuku-ji. Killing one of these sacred deer was a capital offense up until 1637, the last recorded date of a breach of that law.

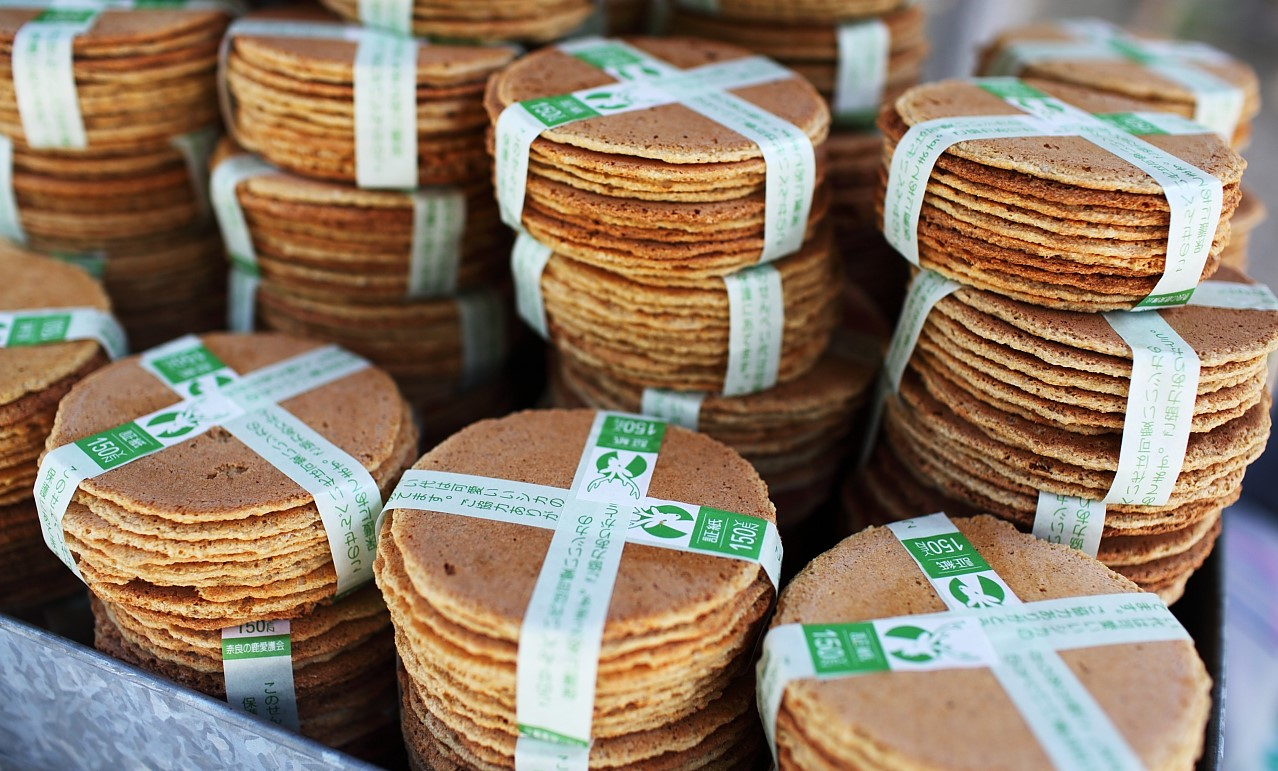
Crackers sold for deer feeding

After World War II, the deer were officially stripped of their sacred/divine status, and were instead designated as natural monument (天然記念物 Tennen kinenbutsu) and are protected as such. Today, visitors can purchase "deer-crackers" (鹿煎餅 Shika-senbei) to feed the deer in the park. These crackers are exclusively sold by the WNOW company.

In January 2023, a joint research team from Fukushima University, Yamagata University, and Nara University of Education revealed that among sika deer inhabiting the Kii Peninsula, those in Nara Park form a unique genetic population. The results of the large-scale genetic research showed that while 18 mitochondrial DNA genotypes were detected in deer living on the Kii Peninsula, only one of these genotypes was detected in deer living in Nara Park, which is not found in deer living in other areas of the Kii Peninsula. The genetic differentiation of the Nara Park deer from the Kii Peninsula deer population occurred about 1,400 years ago, which is genetically close to the year 768, when the Kasuga Grand Shrine was built. The results of this research confirm that the Japanese people have been protecting the deer in this area for more than 1,000 years as messengers of Takemikazuchi, the main deity of Kasuga Grand Shrine, and that this has allowed the deer in this area to maintain their population from generation to generation.

=== Problems related to deer ===
==== Population management and nutrition ====
The number of deer grew in the postwar period to around 1,200 in 2008, leading to concerns about environmental and crop damage and discussion of culling. In 2016, a record number of 121 people were injured by deer. In 2016 it was announced that the area around Nara would be designated into four different zones, with the outer zones allowing deer to be captured and killed. In August 2017, traps were set to catch deer on the outskirts of Nara. The culling started in 2017, with a limit of 120 deer to be culled during 2017. In July 2017 there were around 1,500 deer living in the park, and at least 164 people had been injured by them from 2017 to 2018. Most of them were tourists feeding the deer. In April 2018 Nara city set up new signs in English, Chinese and Japanese informing tourists that the deer are wild animals and to not tease them during feeding.

A 2009 study by Harumi Torii (who is an assistant professor of wildlife management at Nara University of Education), who conducted necropsies on deceased shika deer in Nara Park, found that the deer in Nara Park were malnourished. According to forest journalist Atsuo Tanaka, while the average male deer weighs about 50 kg, the deer in Nara Park weigh only about 30 kg, are small and thin, and the color of the marrow in their femurs indicates that they are malnourished. The number of deer in Nara Park is much higher than the 780 deer that can live in the park, which is derived from the area of the park's lawn. The deer supplement their diet with crackers given to them by tourists, but these crackers are made of wheat flour and rice bran and are unbalanced in nutritional content. While the deer in the park are chronically malnourished, the average life expectancy is 20 years, much longer than in the wild, because humans care for injured, sick, and pregnant deer. Meanwhile, according to the Nara Deer Preservation Foundation, the average weight of a five-year-old male deer as of 2018 was 74 kg, even though the deer in Nara Park are genetically smaller than deer elsewhere.

Due to the COVID-19 pandemic in 2020, the Japanese government implemented travel restrictions. The amount of tourists feeding the Nara deer decreased significantly. The deer lost a vital source of food and began to forage outside of the park. There were concerns that the deer could get hit by vehicles or die from eating harmful plastic and other litter. Some of the deer were observed to be emaciated and not eating the grass in front of them, probably because they had become dependent on crackers, while some deer were observed to have started eating grass, which improved their intestinal environment and the condition of their feces. During the pandemic, the deer population decreased in 2020 and 2021, before increasing over the next four years to 1,465 in 2025. At the same time, an increase in the number of human injuries involving deer has been recorded since 2021.

==== Harm caused by humans ====
In 2010, a man and woman were arrested and jailed for shooting a deer with a crossbow. In 2021, a man was arrested for fatally injuring a deer with an axe.

==== Ticks and Lyme disease ====
Wild deer found in Nara Park are host to ticks that can transmit tick-borne diseases with a reported fatality rate of up to 30%. As of August 2025, Nara Prefecture is urging the public to avoid touching deer unnecessarily.

In 2024, a Spanish woman in her twenties who visited Japan and interacted with the deer in Nara contracted Lyme disease following a tick bite and was treated in Germany; the case received widespread coverage in Spanish-language media.

== In popular culture ==
Alt-J's 2014 album This Is All Yours has the track "Nara", which mentions Nara Park in its lyrics.

My Deer Friend Nokotan predominantly features deer crackers as well as Nara Park. The closing of the anime based on the manga shows production of deer crackers alongside footage of deer at Nara Park.

Team Shanghai Alice's 2026 album Artificial Utopia in Ruins has the track name "Nara Otherworld Park".

== Transport ==
Nara Park is serviced by the Kintetsu Nara Station and is reachable by the Kintetsu Line from Osaka-Namba Station.

== Gallery ==
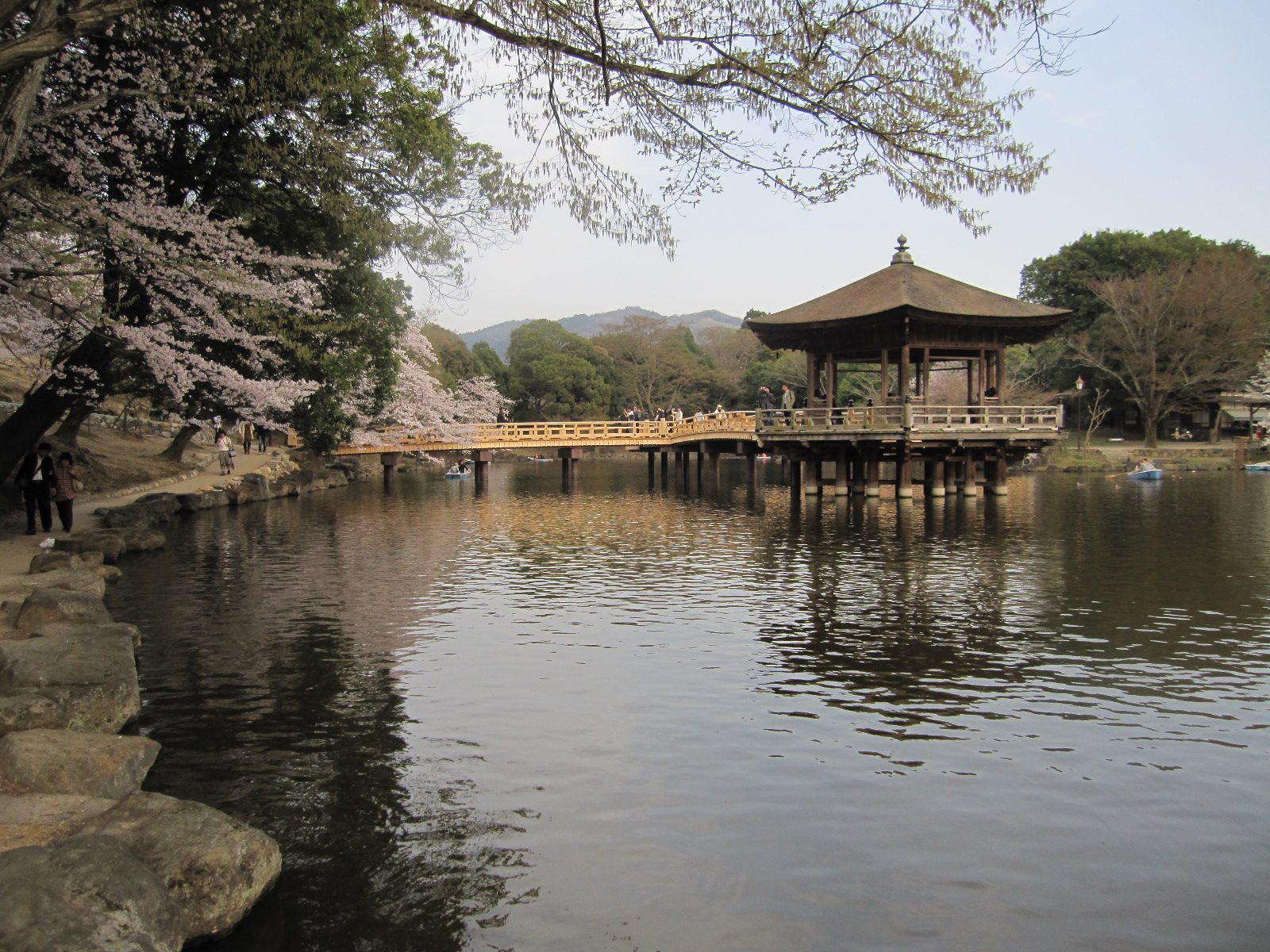
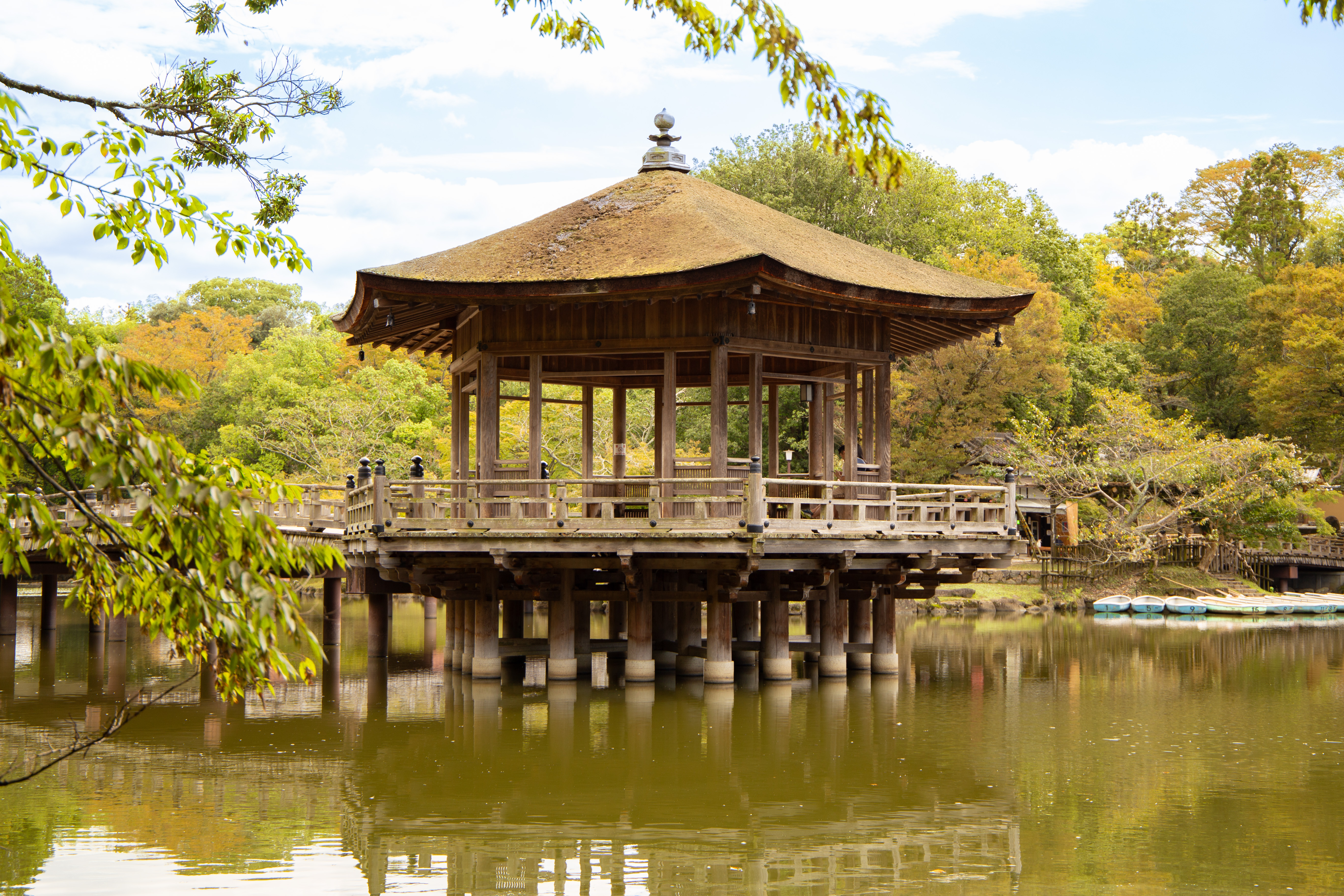
Ukimido Pavilion Nara park
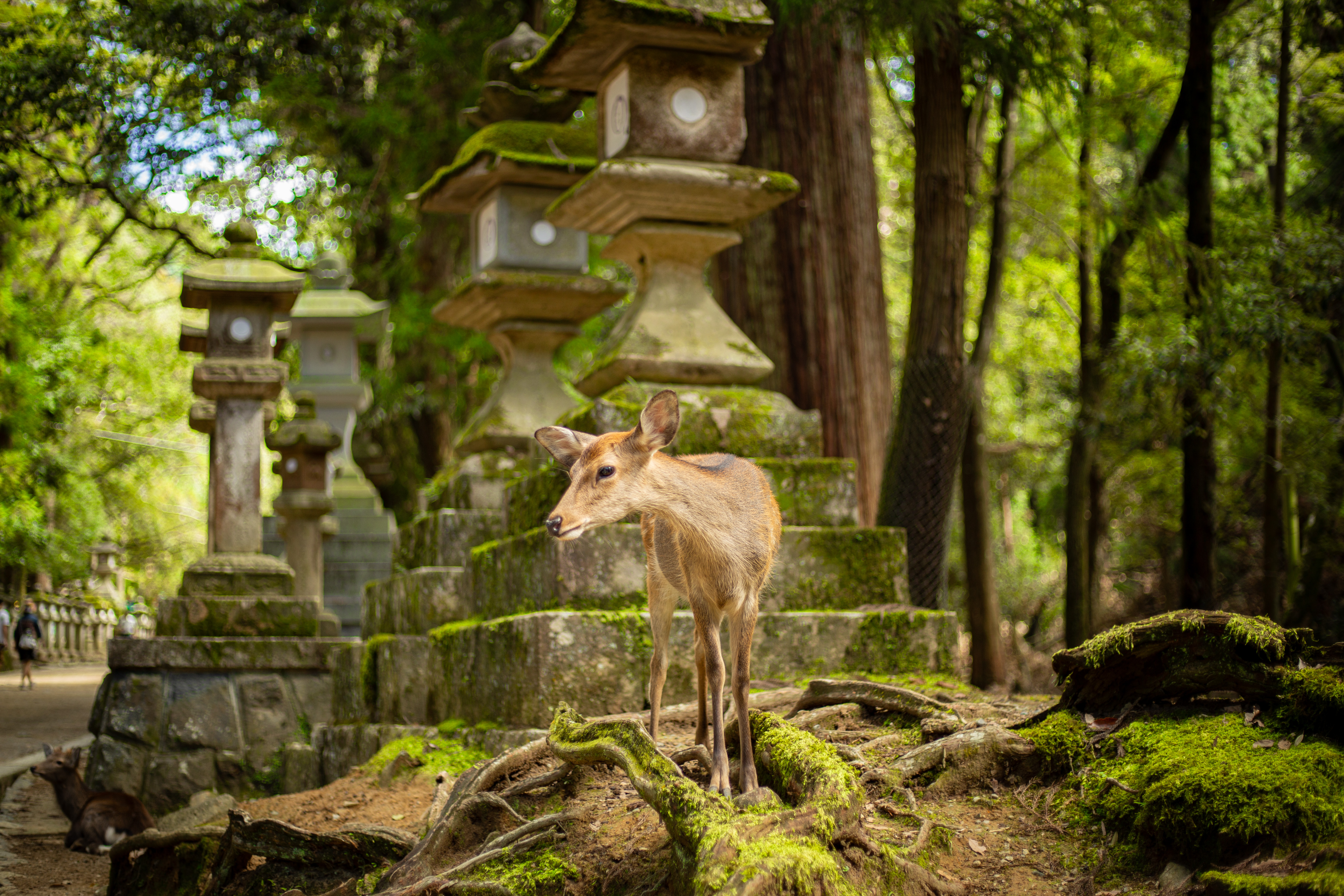
Deer in Nara park
Ukimidou Pavilion

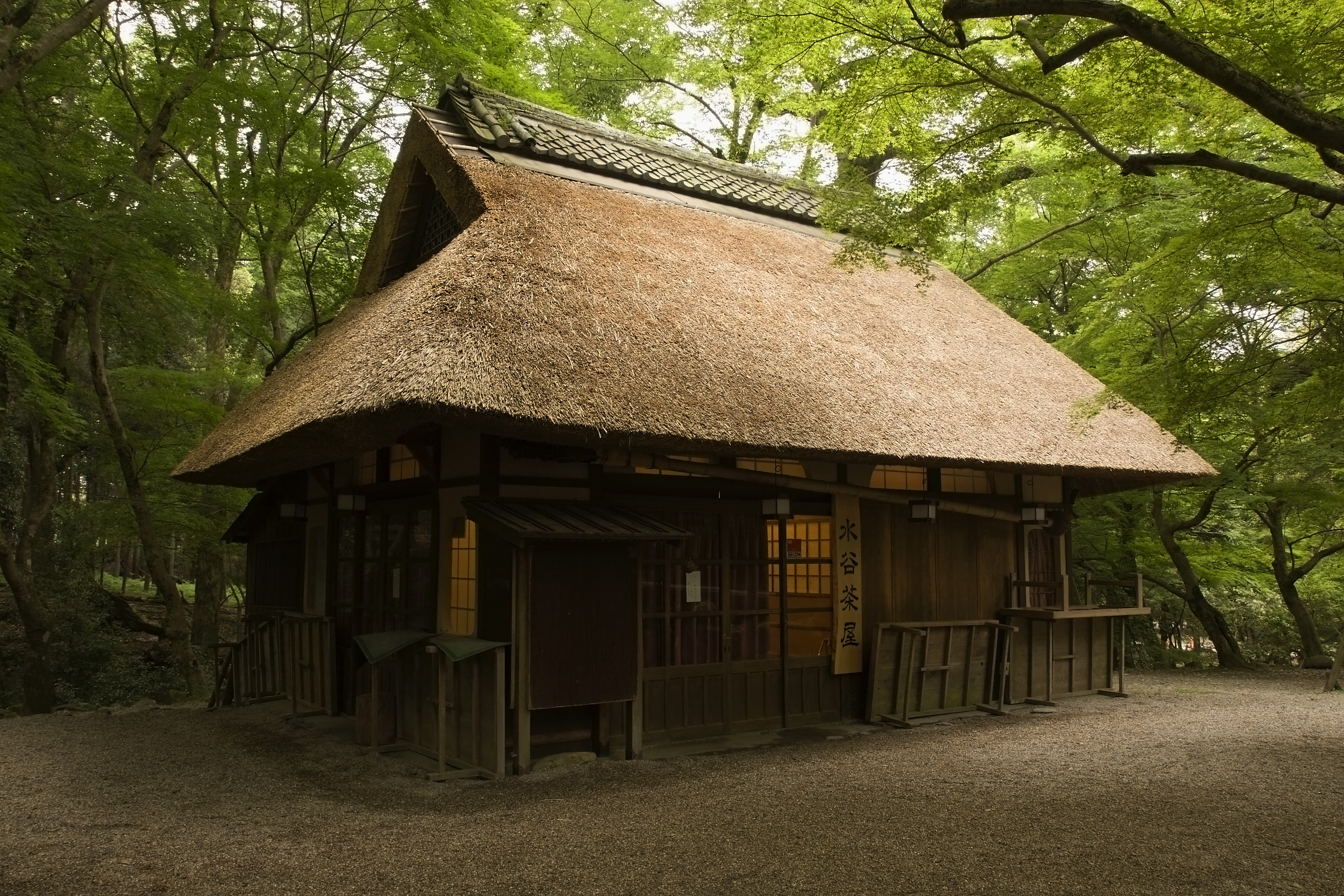
Chaya within the park, offering tea and wagashi

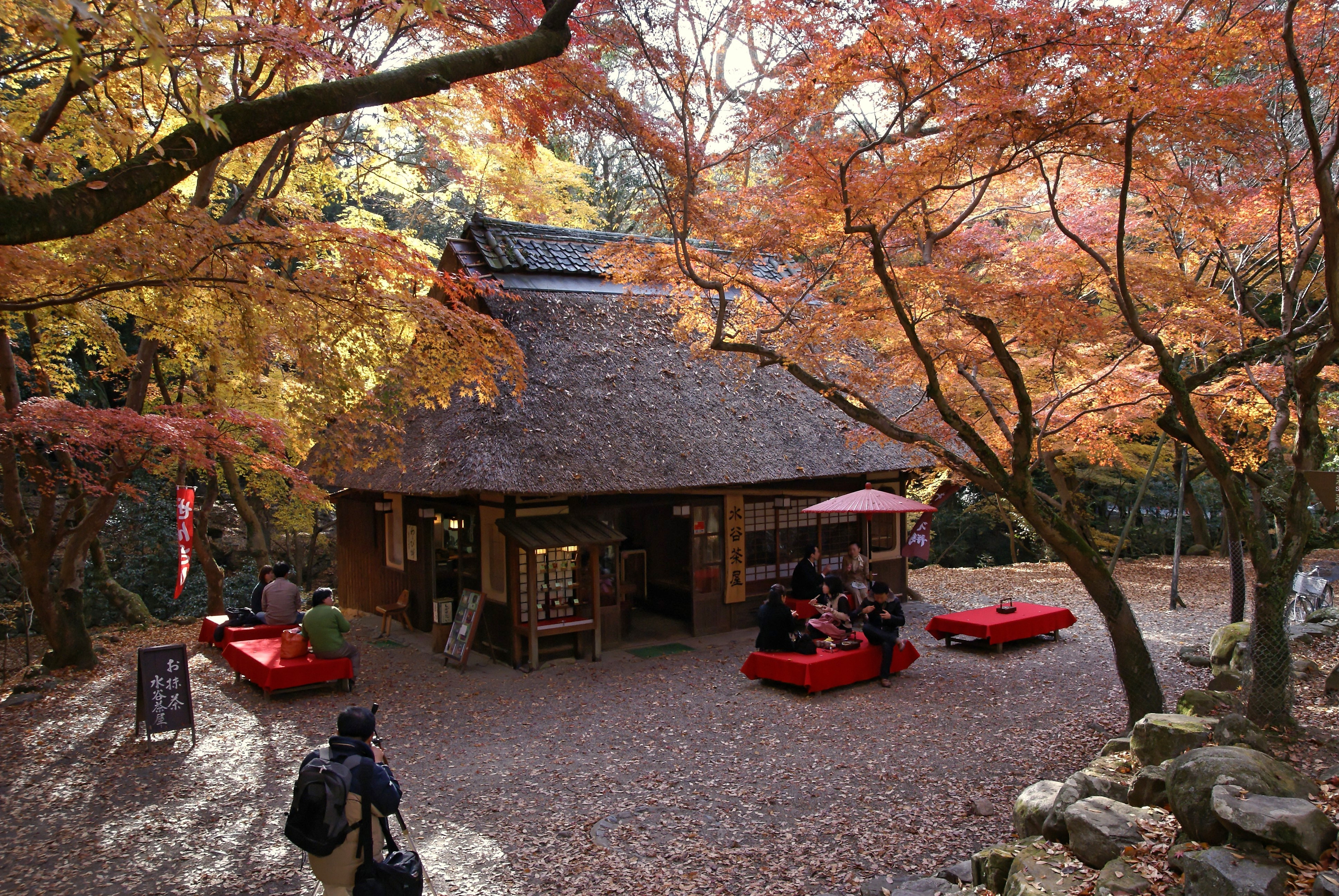
Chaya opens

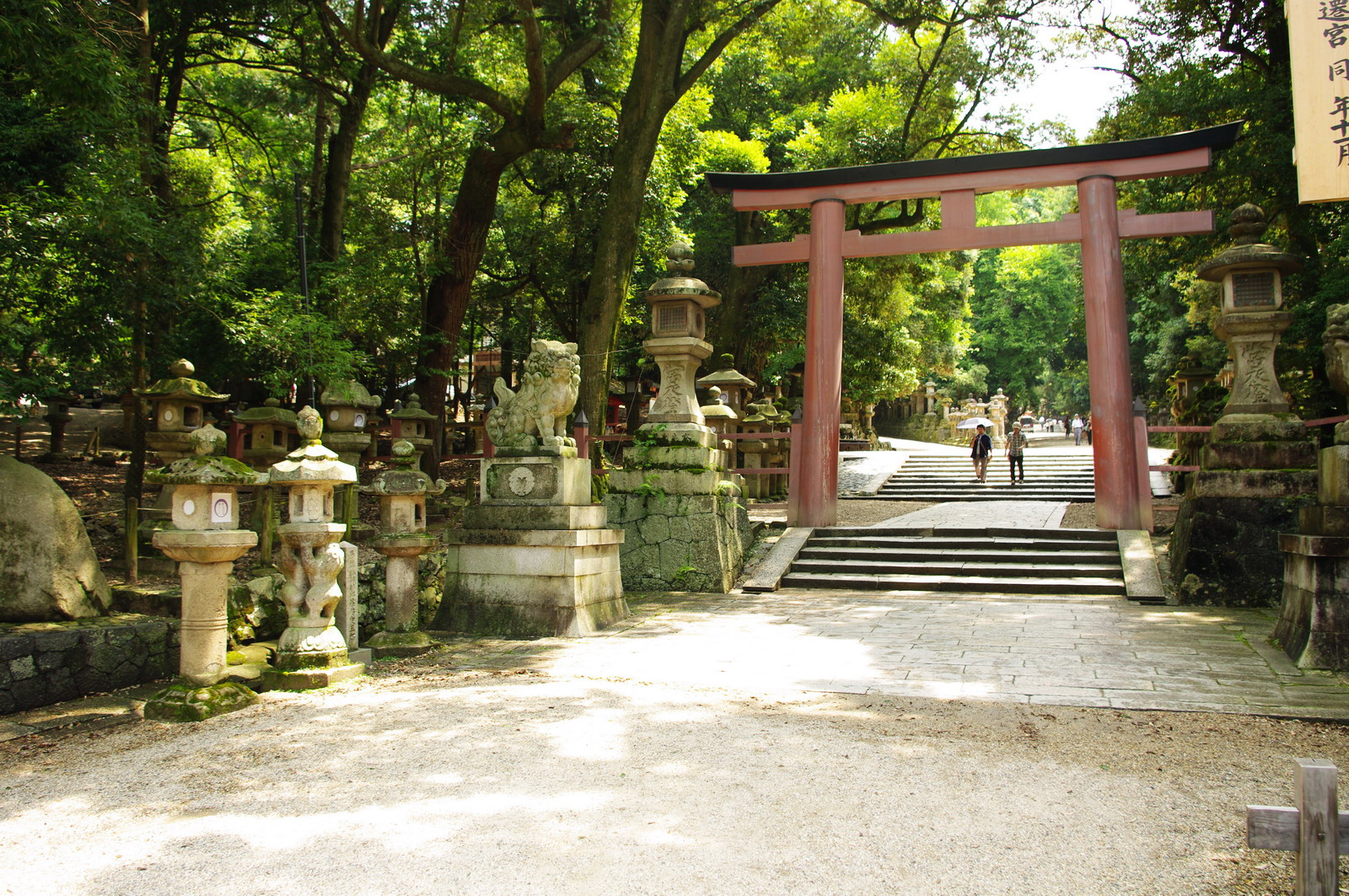
Torii of Kasuga Grand Shrine inside the park
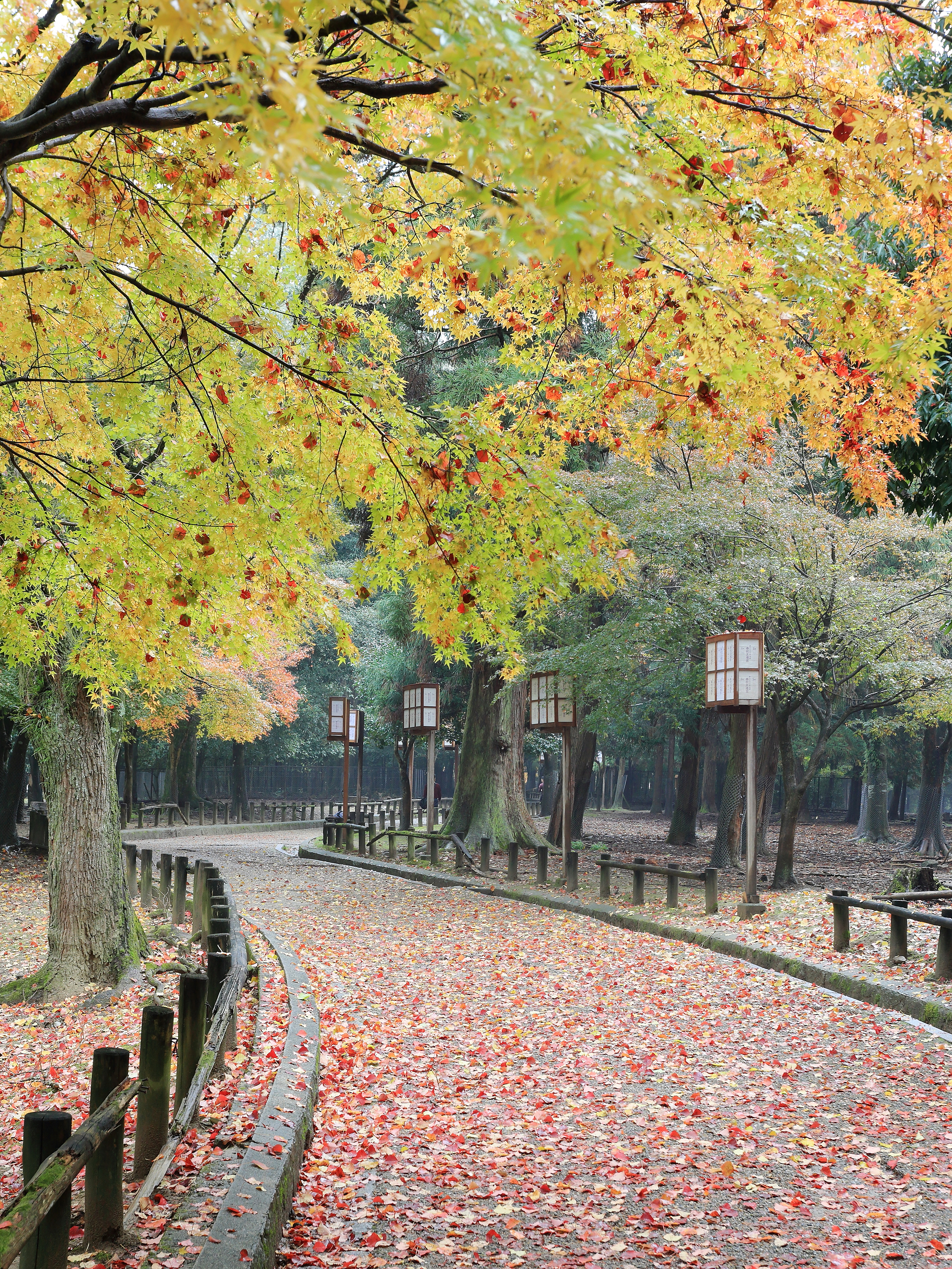
A path inside the park

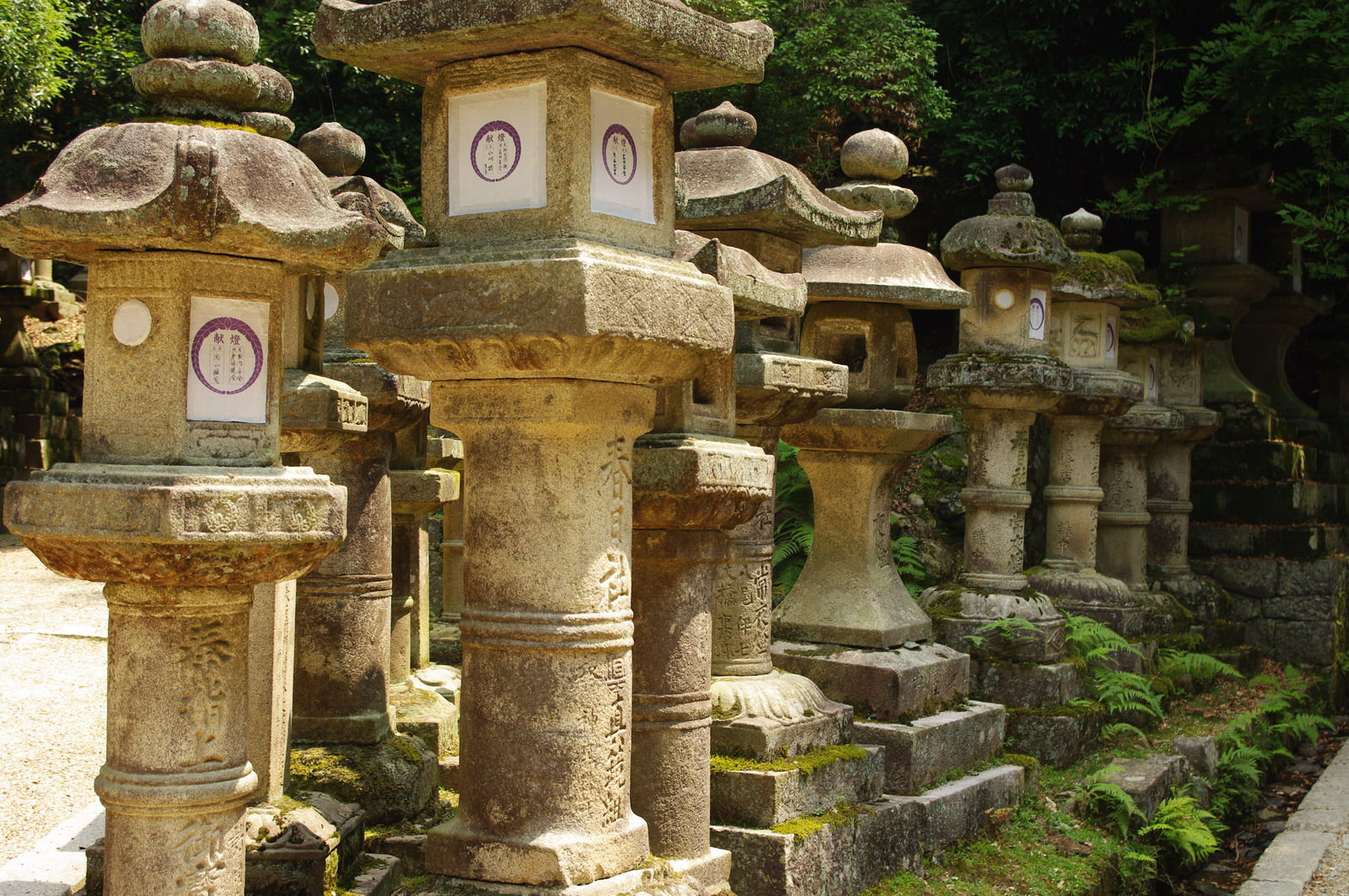
More than 1000 Kasuga Grand Shrine lanterns adorn the park

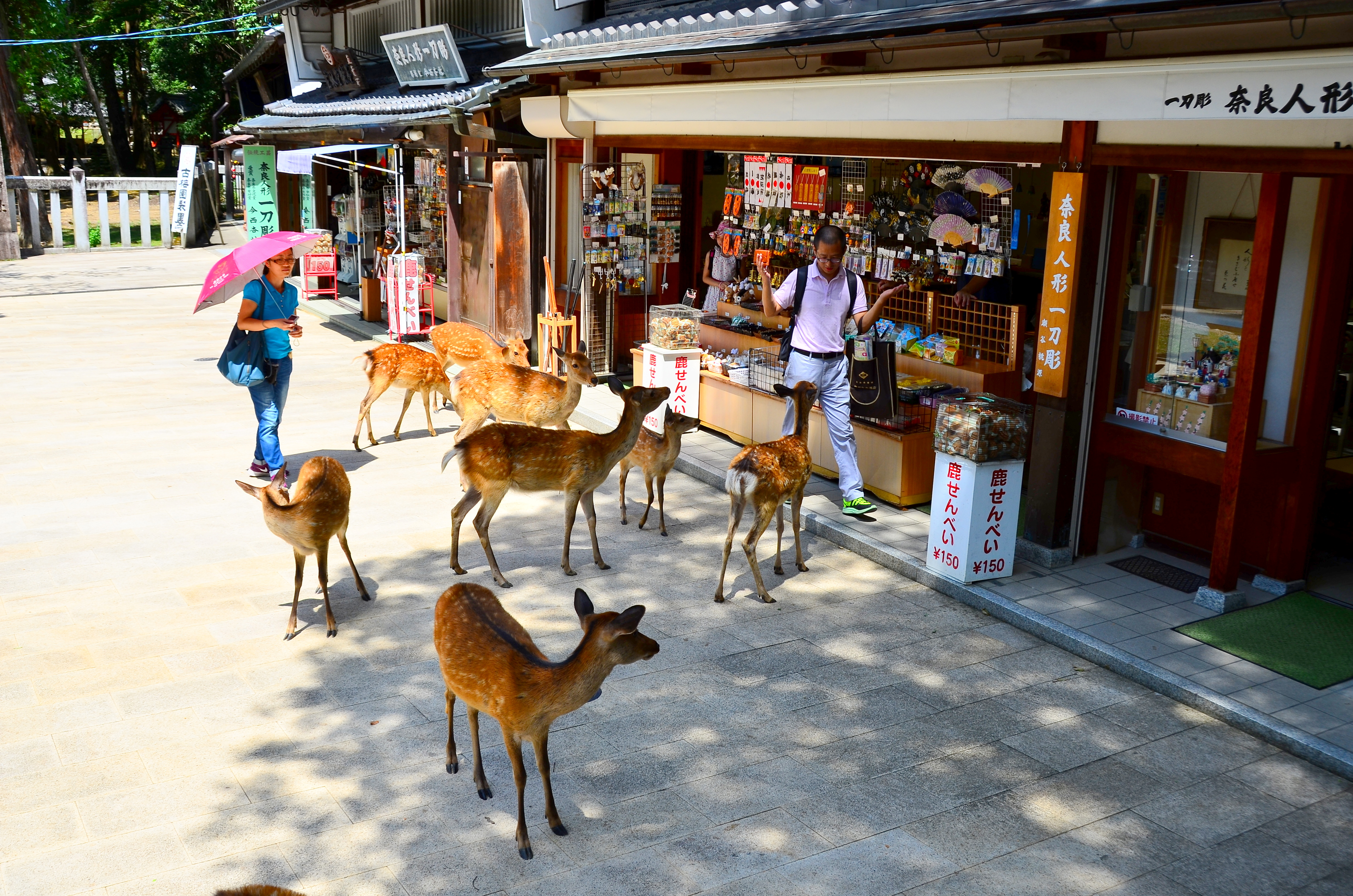
Deer approaching tourists

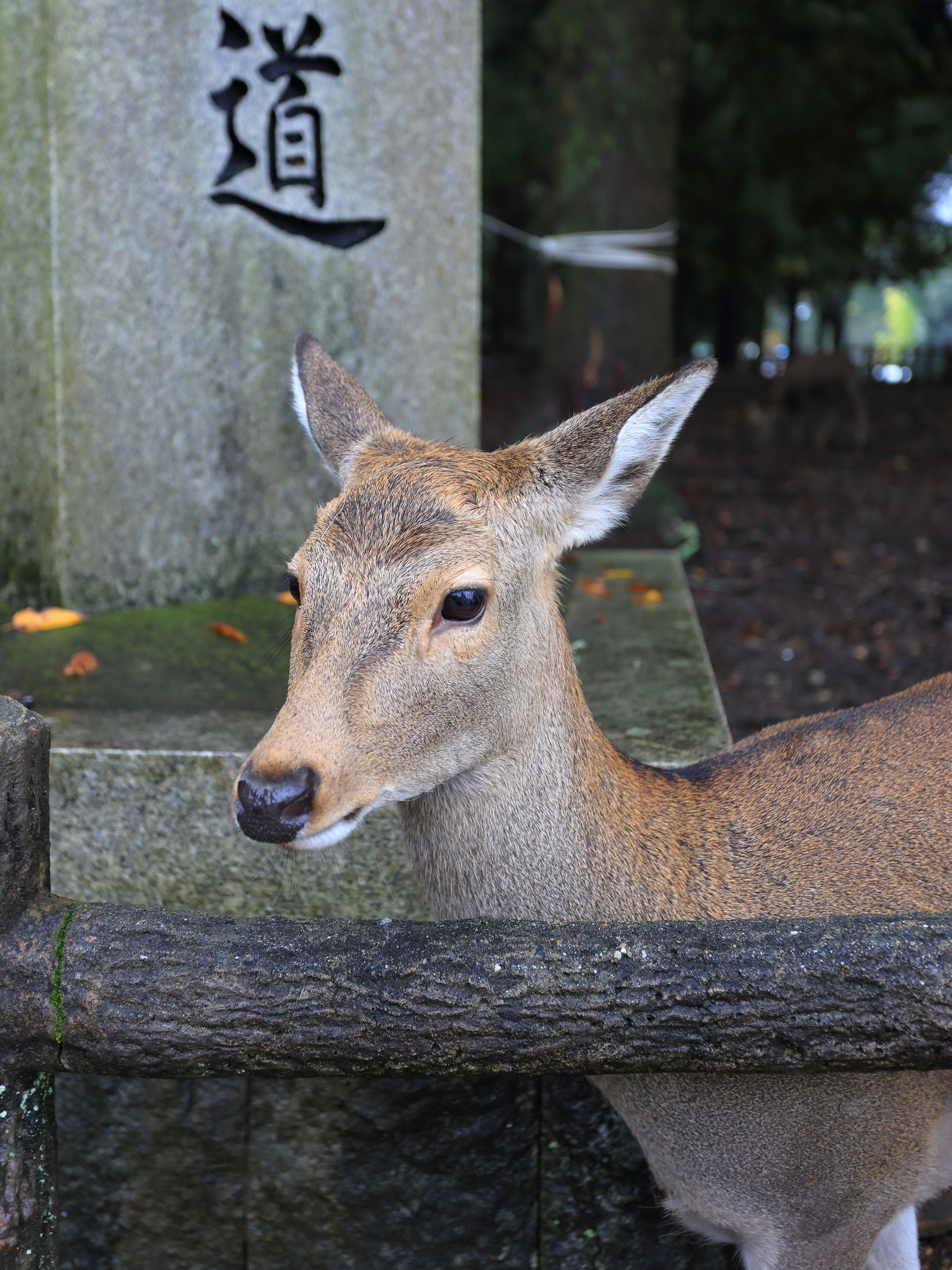
The deer freely roam around in both park and temples.

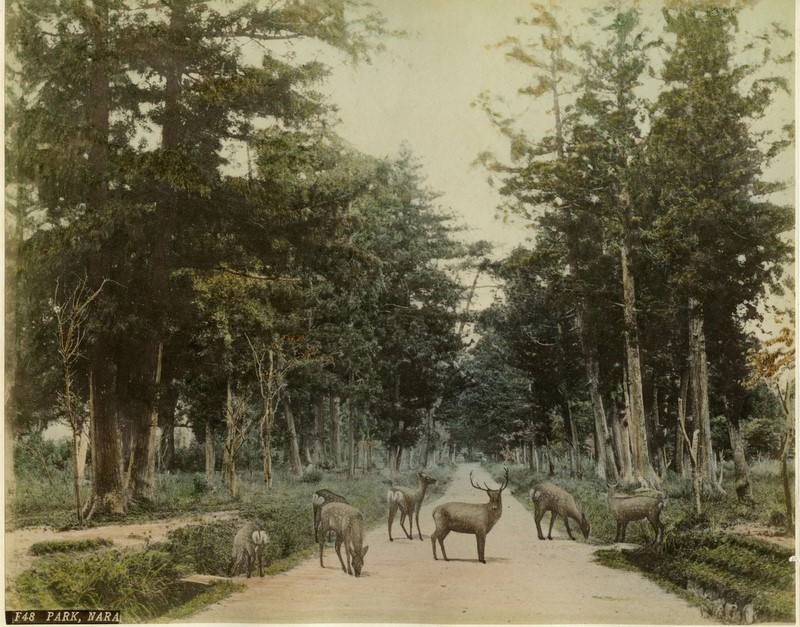
Nara Park, photograph by Adolfo Farsari (before 1898)
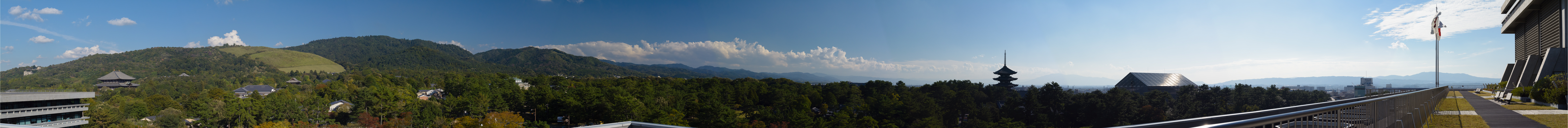
Nara Park and Mount Wakakusa from Nara prefectural government office
