= Misaka =

Misaka is a surname. Notable people and fictional characters with the name include:

== People ==
- Wat Misaka (1923–2019), American basketball player

== Fictional characters ==
- Kaori Misaka, a character in the Kanon series
- Mikoto Misaka, one of the main characters in the A Certain Magical Index series
- Shiori Misaka, a character in the Kanon series
