= Mount Wakakusa =

Mountain in Japan

- 若草山
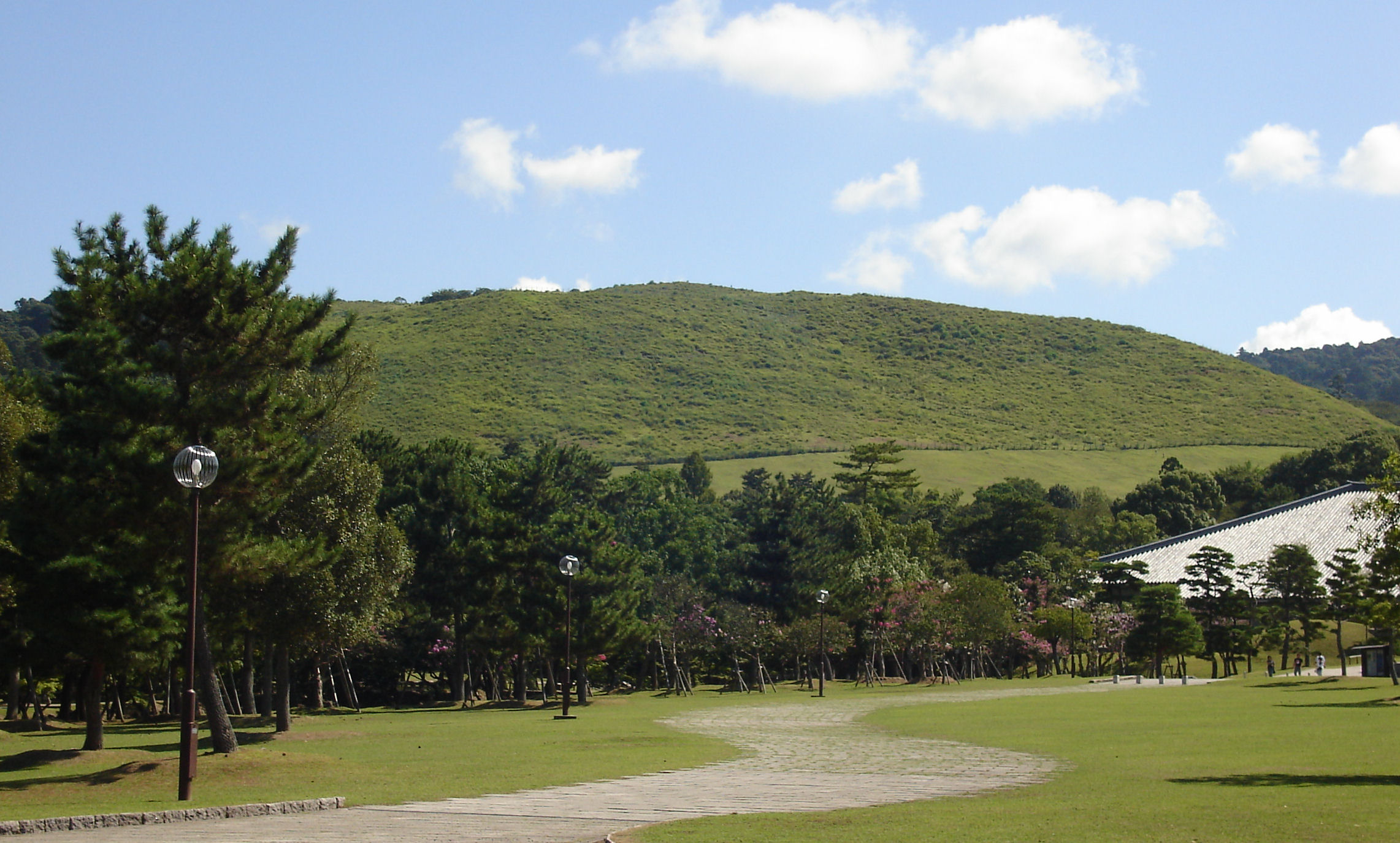

Highest point
- Elevation: 342 m (1,122 ft)
- Listing: Mountains of Japan
- Coordinates: 34°41′28″N 135°51′15″E

Geography
- Location within Japan
- Location: Nara, Japan
- Parent range: Kasagi Mountains

Mount Wakakusa (若草山, Wakakusa-yama), also known as Mount Mikasa (三笠山 Mikasa-yama), is a 342-metre-high (1,122 ft) hill located to the east of Nara Park in the city of Nara, Nara Prefecture, Japan. The mountain's name literally means "young grass". The mountain is closed from December 12th to March 17th and cannot be accessed.

On the fourth Saturday of January each year, the dead grass of Mount Wakakusa is burned in an annual festival known as Yamayaki (山焼き literally "mountain burning").

== Yamayaki festival ==
On the fourth Saturday of January, the dead grass on Mount Wakakusa is burned in an annual festival known as Yamayaki (山焼き literally "mountain burning"). The tradition supposedly originated from a boundary dispute between two temples, Tōdai-ji and Kōfuku-ji in 1760; after mediation failed, the entire mountain was set ablaze. Other explanations suggest that the extermination of wild boar or other pests was the original purpose. The festival today begins with a ceremonial igniting by representatives of both temples, followed by a fireworks display. The festival has sometimes been postponed or cancelled because of poor weather or during wartime.

The burning of Mount Wakakusa as part of the annual festival can be seen from the city of Nara and many other locations in the northern part of the Nara Basin. It can be viewed at a further distance from the Aeon Mall Yamato-kōriyama multilevel parking lot, and from buildings in the cities of Kashihara and Gose. The blazing hillside is also visible from Mount Kongō, Mount Ikoma, Hōzan-ji and the ryokan street directly below it. The most popular viewing locations, however, include Nara Park near the five-storied pagoda of Kōfuku-ji, Oike pond near Yakushi-ji, and Heijō Palace.

== Gallery ==
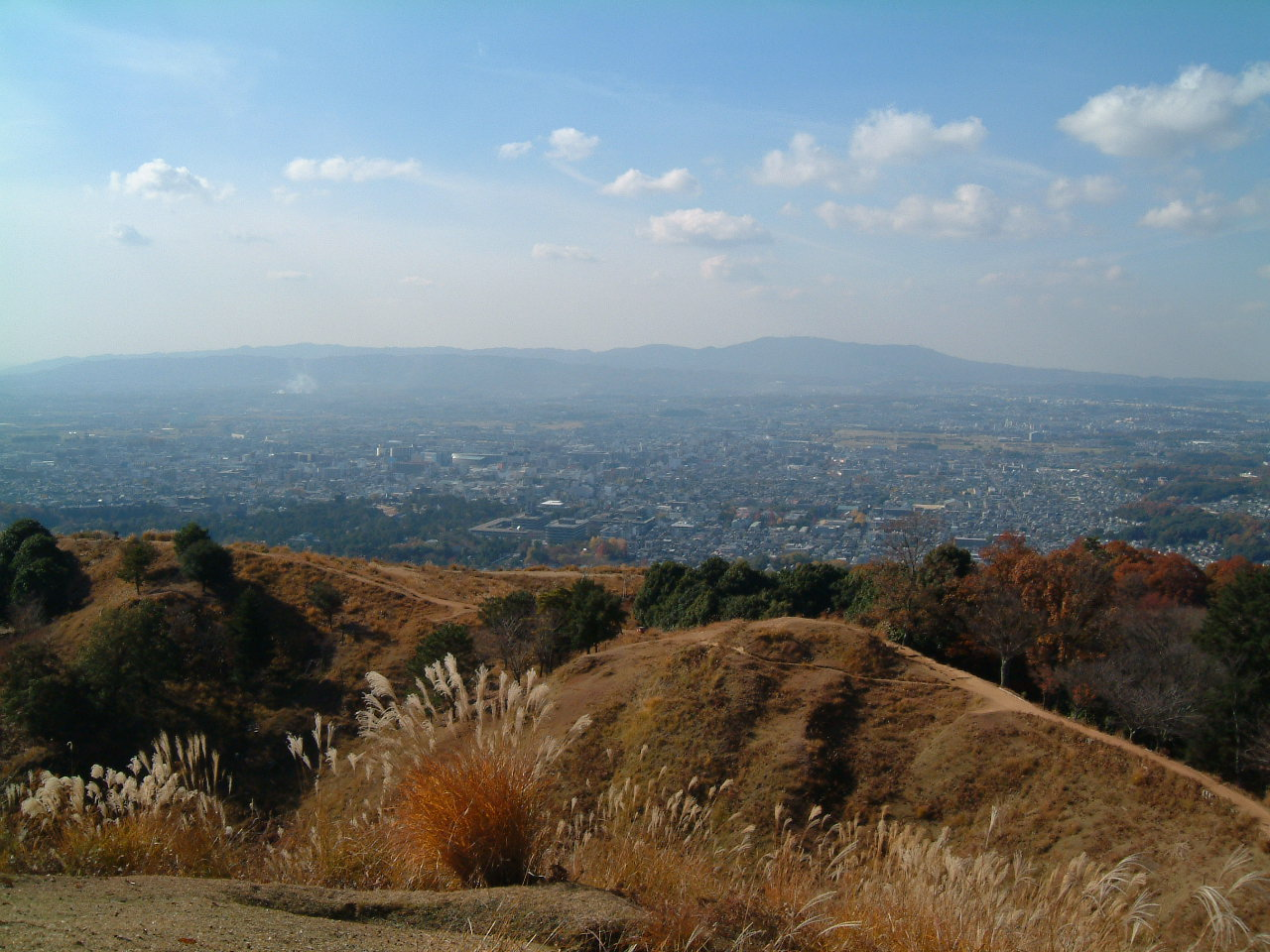
Overlooking Nara

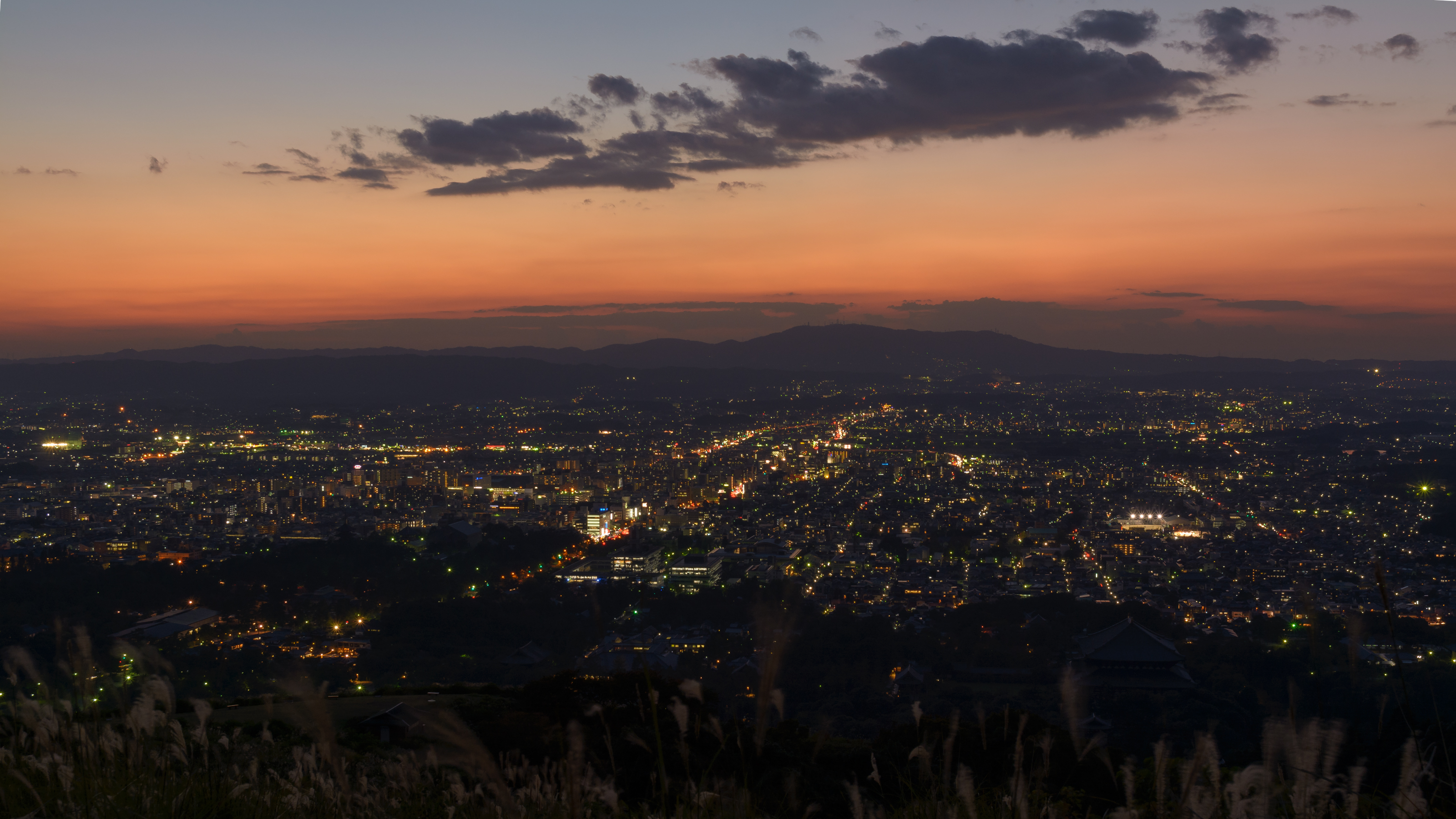
Night view of Nara

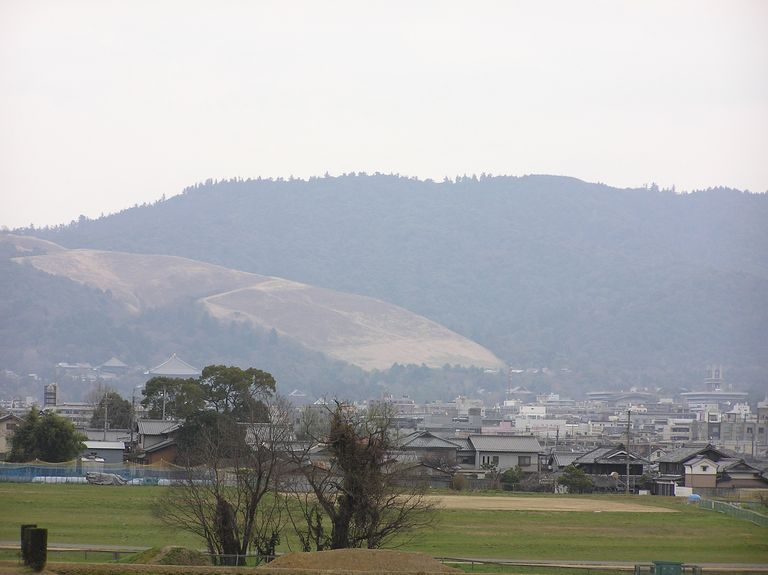
Viewed from Heijō Palace (with Mt Kasuga on the right)

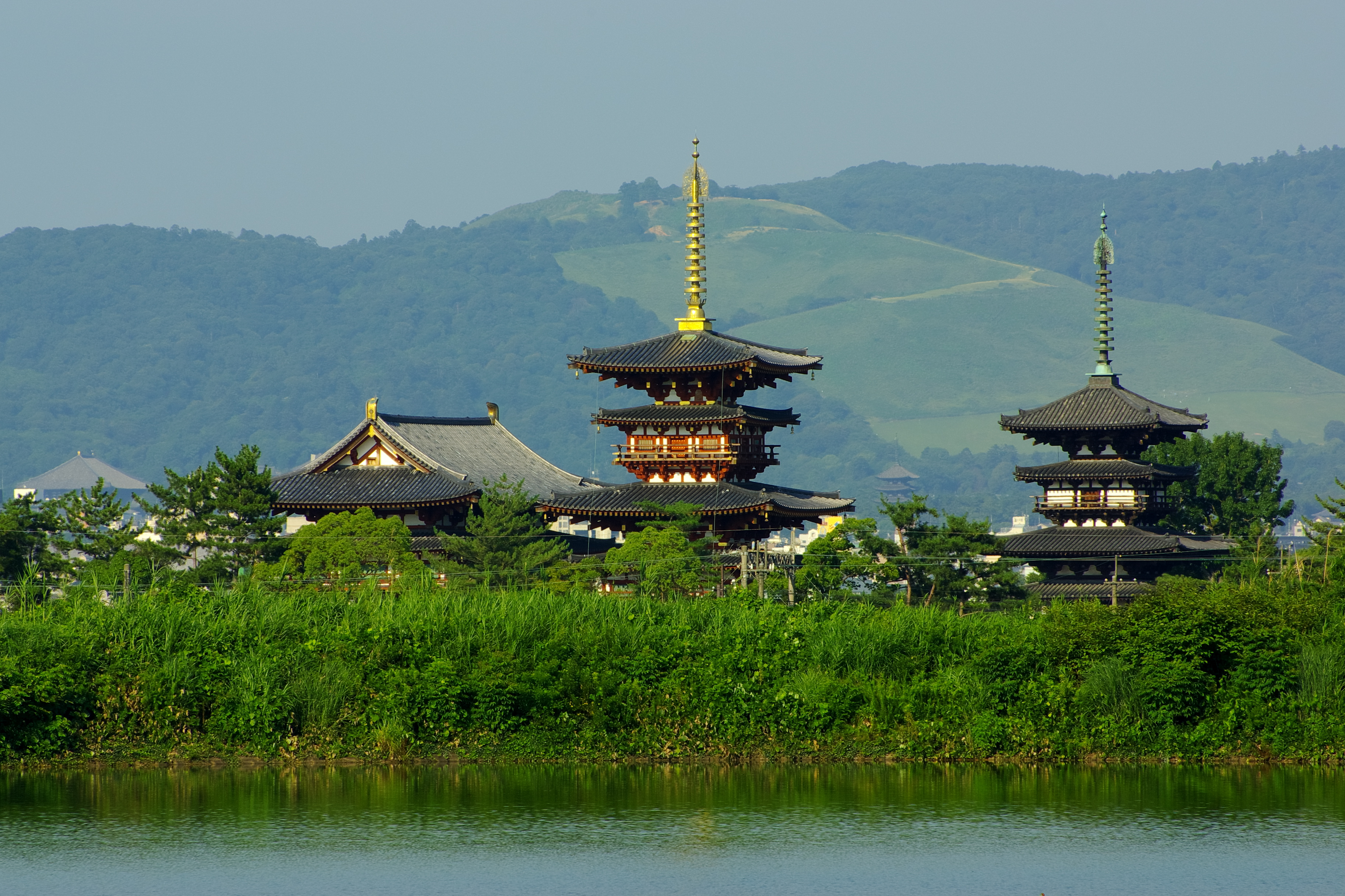
Yakushiji and Mount Wakakusa seen from Oike pond

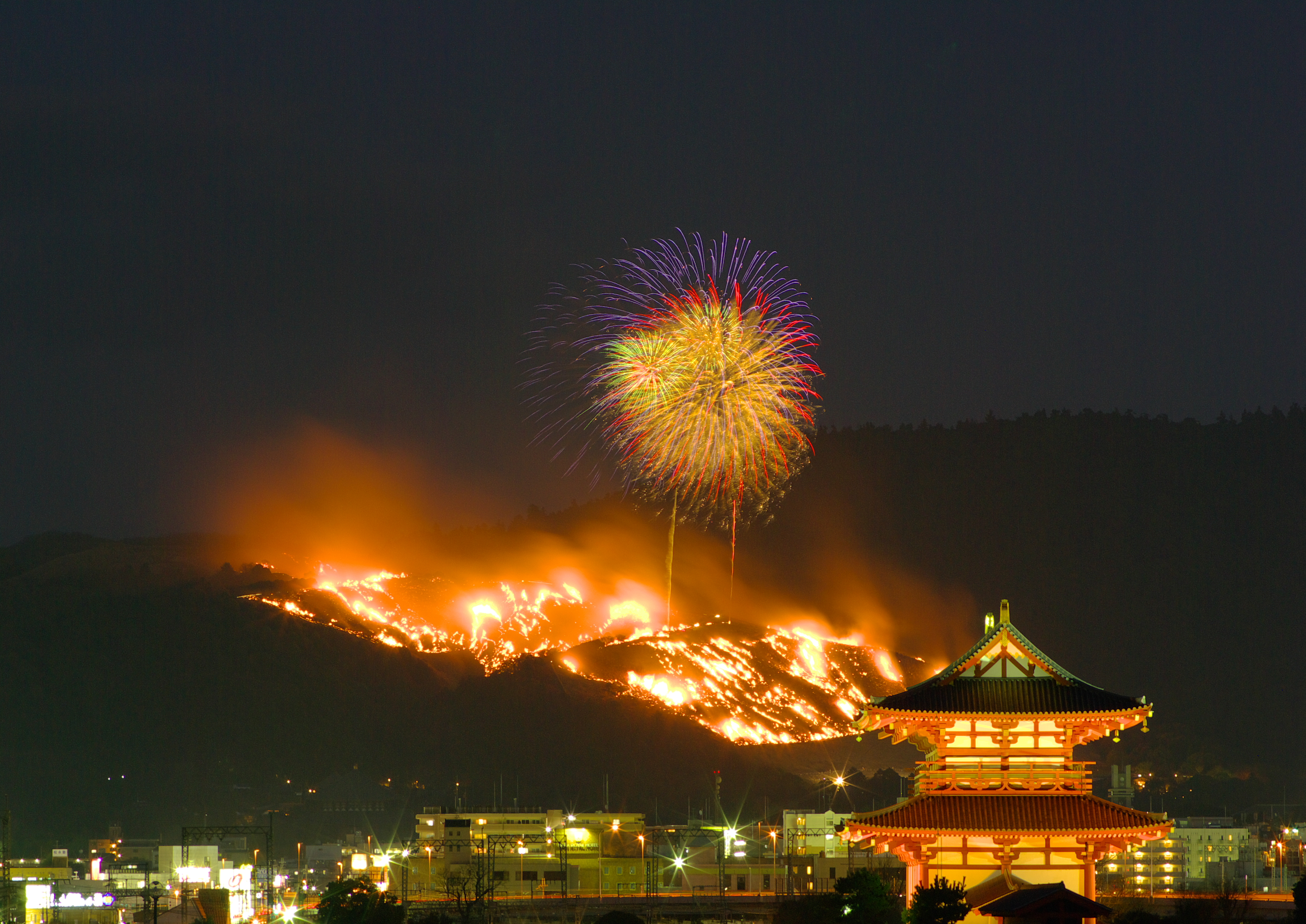
Burning the dead grass, with accompanying fireworks

Burning the dead grass (animation)
