= Fuji-class battleship =

Imperial Japanese Navy ship class

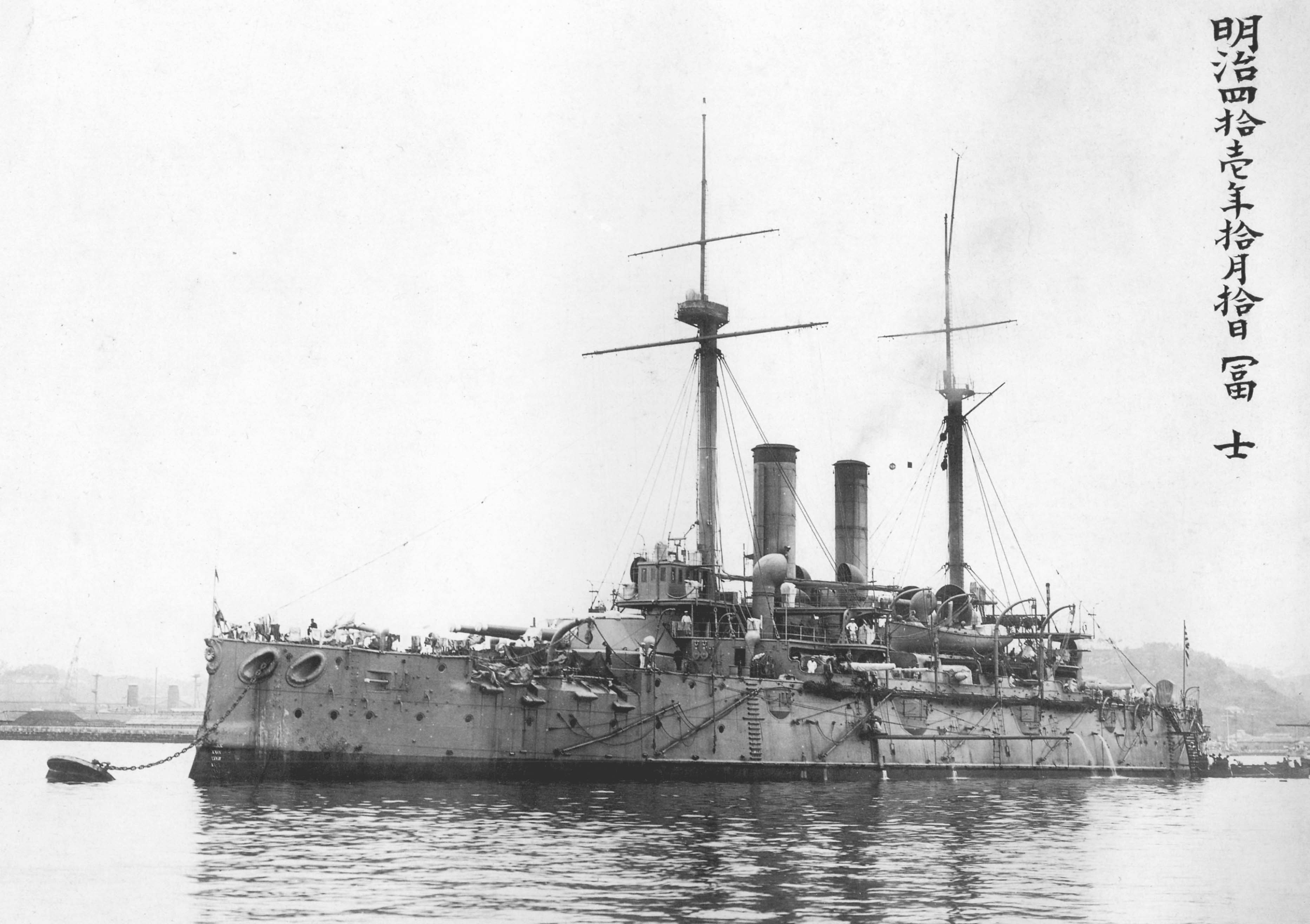
- Fuji at anchor

Class overview
- Name: Fuji-class battleship
- Builders: Armstrong, Whitworth; Thames Ironworks
- Operators: Imperial Japanese Navy
- Preceded by: Kongō-class ironclad
- Succeeded by: Shikishima class
- Built: 1894–1897
- In commission: 1897–1922
- Completed: 2
- Lost: 1
- Scrapped: 1

General characteristics
- Type: Pre-dreadnought battleship
- Displacement: 12,230–12,533 long tons (12,426–12,734 t)
- Length: 412 ft (125.6 m)
- Beam: 73.25–73.75 ft (22.3–22.5 m)
- Draught: 26.25–26.5 ft (8.0–8.1 m)
- Installed power: 13,500 ihp (10,100 kW); 10 cylindrical boilers
- Propulsion: 2 shafts, 2 triple-expansion steam engines
- Speed: 18.25 knots (33.8 km/h; 21.0 mph)
- Range: 4,000 nmi (7,400 km; 4,600 mi) at 10 knots (19 km/h; 12 mph)
- Complement: 650
- Armament: 2 × twin 12 in (305 mm) guns; 10 × single 6 in (152 mm) QF guns; 14 × single 3-pounder guns; 10 × single 2.5-pounder Hotchkiss guns; 5 × 18-inch torpedo tubes
- Armour: Harvey armour; Belt: 14–18 in (356–457 mm); Deck: 2.5 in (64 mm); Barbettes: 5–14 in (127–356 mm); Gun turrets: 6 in (152 mm); Conning tower: 14 in (356 mm); Bulkheads: 14–12 in (356–305 mm)

The Fuji class (Japanese: 富士型戦艦, Hepburn: Fuji-gata senkan) was a two-ship class of pre-dreadnought battleships built for the Imperial Japanese Navy (IJN) in the mid-1890s. They were the first battleships in the IJN, and were constructed in the United Kingdom, as Japan lacked the industrial facilities needed to build them. Their design was based on the battleships being built for the Royal Navy at that time.

The ships participated in the Russo-Japanese War of 1904–1905, including the Battle of Port Arthur in February 1904 and two bombardments of Port Arthur during the following month. Yashima struck a mine off Port Arthur in May and capsized while under tow several hours later. Fuji fought in the Battles of the Yellow Sea and Tsushima and was lightly damaged in the latter action. She was reclassified as a coast defence ship in 1910 and served as a training ship for the rest of her active career. The ship was hulked in 1922 and converted into a barracks ship fitted with classrooms. Fuji was finally broken up for scrap in 1948.

== Background ==
In the late 19th century, the strategy of the Imperial Japanese Navy was based on the radical Jeune École naval philosophy, as promoted by French military advisor and naval architect Emile Bertin. This emphasised cheap torpedo boats and commerce raiding to offset expensive, heavily armoured ships. The acquisition of two German-built Dingyuan-class ironclads by the Imperial Chinese Beiyang Fleet in 1885 threatened Japan's interests in Korea. A visit by the Chinese warships to Japan in early 1891 forced the Japanese government to acknowledge that the IJN required similarly armed and armoured ships of its own to counter the ironclads; the three lightly armoured Matsushima-class cruisers ordered from France would not suffice, despite their powerful guns. The IJN decided to order a pair of the latest battleships from the United Kingdom as Japan lacked the technology and capability to construct its own battleships.

Obtaining funding for the battleships was a struggle for the Japanese government. The initial request was submitted in the budget of Prime Minister Matsukata Masayoshi in 1891, but was deleted by the Diet of Japan due to political infighting. Matsukata submitted the request again and, when again denied, was forced to dissolve his cabinet. His successor, Prime Minister Itō Hirobumi, attempted to pass the funding measure in 1892, but he also failed. This led to an extraordinary personal intervention by Emperor Meiji in a statement dated 10 February 1893, wherein the emperor offered to fund the construction of the two battleships himself, through an annual reduction in the expenses of the Imperial Household, and asked that all government officials likewise agree to a reduction in their salaries by ten percent. The funding measure for the Fuji-class battleships was passed by the Japanese Diet soon after. Completion of the ships was originally scheduled for 1899, but the start of the First Sino-Japanese War shortly before they were laid down in 1894 caused the government to accelerate the schedule by two years.

== Design and description ==
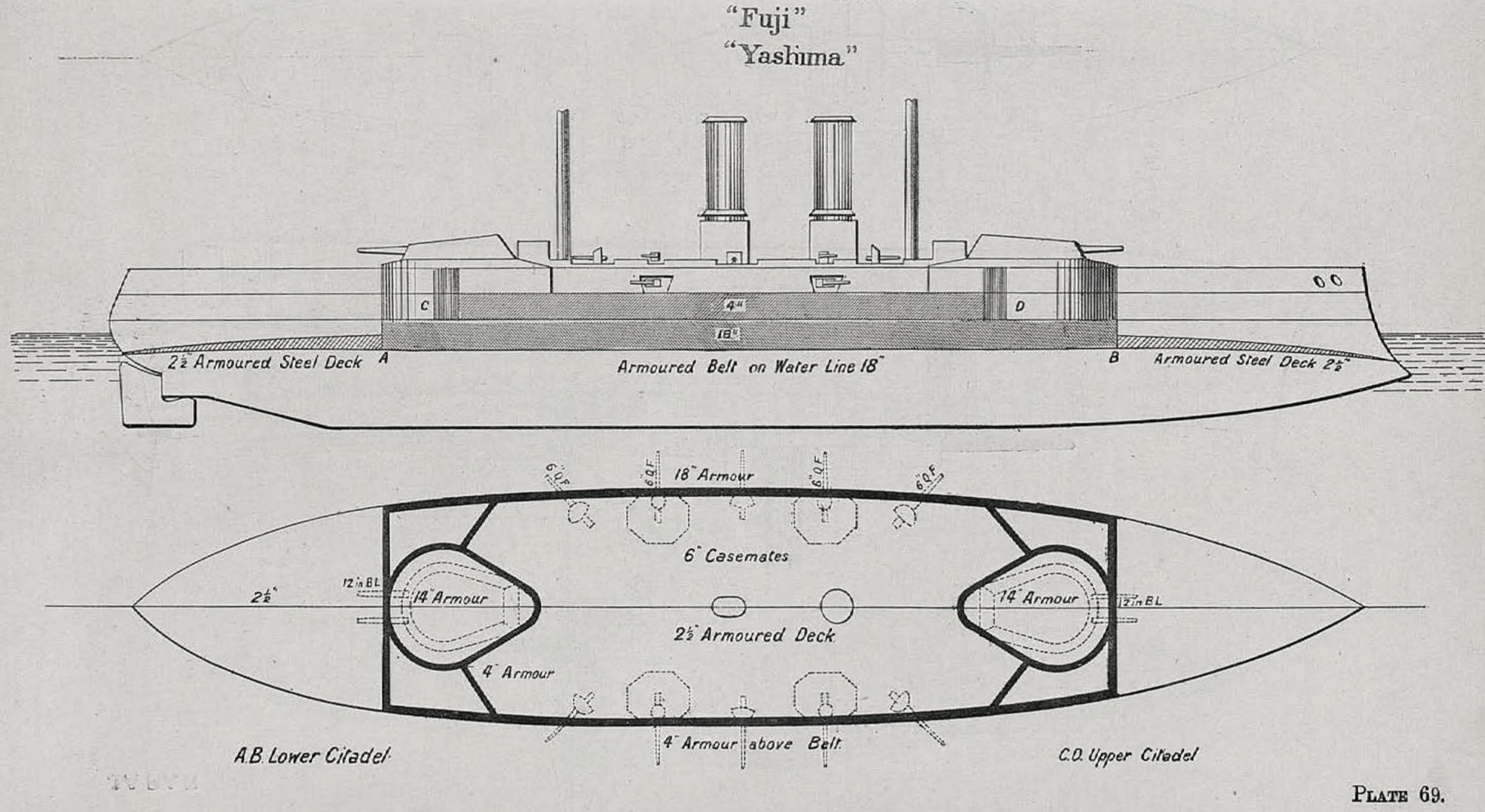
Right elevation and deck plan as depicted in Brassey's Naval Annual 1896

The design of the Fuji class was derived from that of the British Royal Sovereign-class battleships, albeit about 2,000 long tons (2,000 t) smaller. The Fuji-class ships improved on the Royal Sovereigns in several ways; they were about 1 knot (1.9 km/h; 1.2 mph) faster, they incorporated superior Harvey armour, and their guns, although smaller and lighter, were the same as those of the later Majestic-class and were protected by armoured hoods (gun turrets). The two ships of the class were almost identical even though they were designed by two different naval architects, Yashima by Philip Watts and Fuji by George C. Mackrow. The primary difference was that Yashima had her deadwood cut away aft and was fitted with a balanced rudder. This made her almost a knot faster than her sister and gave her a smaller turning circle at the cost of a weaker stern that required careful attention when drydocked lest it sag.

The Fuji-class ships had an overall length of 412 feet (125.6 m), a beam of 73.25–73.75 feet (22.3–22.5 m), and a normal draught of 26.25–26.5 feet (8.0–8.1 m). They displaced 12,230–12,533 long tons (12,426–12,734 t) at normal load. The ships had double bottoms and were subdivided into a total of 181 watertight compartments. The crew numbered about 650 officers and enlisted men. Yashima was fitted as a flagship with accommodation for an admiral and his staff.

=== Propulsion ===
The Fuji-class ships were powered by two Humphrys Tennant 3-cylinder vertical triple-expansion steam engines, each driving one 17-foot (5.18 m) propeller, using steam generated by ten cylindrical boilers with a working pressure of 10.9 kg/cm^{2} (1,069 kPa; 155 psi). The engines were rated at 13,500 indicated horsepower (10,100 kW), using forced draught, and designed to reach a top speed of 18.25 knots (33.8 km/h; 21.0 mph) although the ships proved to be faster during their sea trials, reaching top speeds of 18.66 to 19.46 knots (34.56 to 36.04 km/h; 21.47 to 22.39 mph). A watertight centreline bulkhead separated the two engine rooms as well as the four boiler rooms. The boiler rooms were further separated by a transverse bulkhead. Unlike both the Royal Sovereigns and Majestics, the Fuji class had their funnels on the centreline.

The ships carried a maximum of 1,620 tonnes (1,590 long tons) of coal which allowed them to steam for 4,000 nautical miles (7,400 km; 4,600 mi) at a speed of 10 knots (19 km/h; 12 mph). (Note: Lengerer gives coal storage figures of 1,110 to 1,117 long tons (1,128 to 1,135 t) that gave them ranges of 7,000 nmi (13,000 km; 8,100 mi) at 10 knots.) They were fitted with three electric dynamos, each rated at 32 kilowatts (43 hp).

=== Armament ===
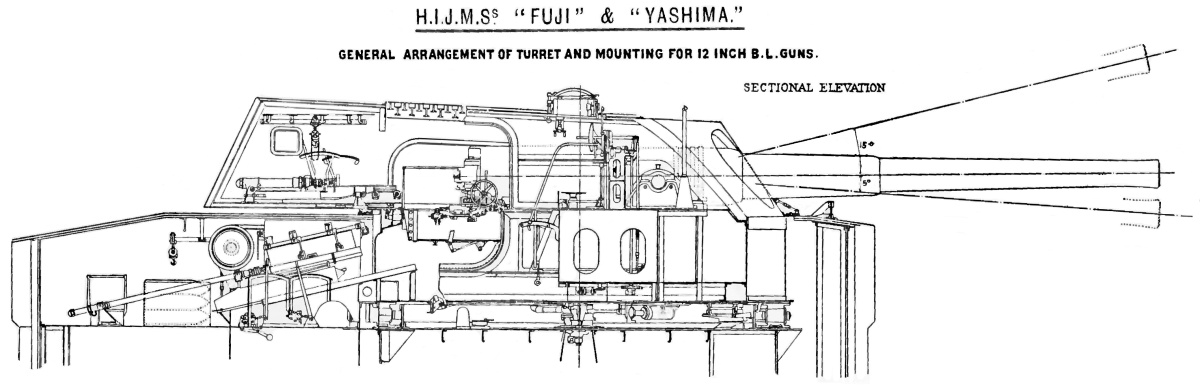
12-inch gun turret arrangement

The main battery of the Fuji class consisted of four hydraulically operated Elswick Ordnance Company 40-calibre Type 41 twelve-inch guns mounted in pear-shaped twin-gun barbettes fore and aft of the superstructure. The barbettes had a firing arc of 240° and the guns had a maximum elevation of +15° and could depress to −5°. These barbettes had armoured hoods, or turrets, to protect the guns. The mountings were virtually identical to those used in the first Majestic-class battleships, which could only hoist ammunition from the below-decks magazines in one position. However, 18 shells were stowed in each turret, allowing a limited amount of firing at any angle before their ammunition supply needed to be replenished. The guns were loaded at a fixed angle of 1° and fired 850-pound (386 kg) projectiles at a muzzle velocity of 2,400 ft/s (730 m/s). This gave them an approximate range of 16,000 yards (15,000 m).

Secondary armament of the Fuji class consisted of ten 40-calibre Type 41 six-inch quick-firing guns, four on the main deck in casemates and six guns on the upper deck protected by gun shields. They fired 100-pound (45 kg) shells at a muzzle velocity of 2,300 ft/s (700 m/s). Protection from torpedo boat attacks was provided by fourteen 47-millimetre (1.9 in) three-pounder Hotchkiss guns and ten 47-millimetre 2.5-pounder Hotchkiss guns. (Note: Sources differ significantly on the exact outfit of light guns. Naval historians Roger Chesneau and Eugene Kolesnik and Hans Lengerer cite twenty 3- and four 2.5-pounders. Jentschura, Jung & Mickel give a total of twenty-four 47 mm guns, without dividing them between the 3 and 2.5-pounders, while Silverstone says that they had only twenty 47 mm guns, again without discriminating between the two types.) The three-pounder gun fired 3.2-pound (1.5 kg) projectiles at a muzzle velocity of 1,927 ft/s (587 m/s) while the 2.5-pounder fired 2.5-pound (1.1 kg) shells at a muzzle velocity of 1,420 ft/s (430 m/s). The ships were also equipped with five 18-inch torpedo tubes, one in the bow above water and four submerged tubes, two on each broadside.

In 1901, both ships exchanged 16 of their 47 mm guns for an equal number of QF 12-pounder 12 cwt (Note: "Cwt" is the abbreviation for hundredweight, 12 cwt referring to the weight of the gun.) guns. They fired 3-inch (76 mm), 12.5-pound (5.7 kg) projectiles at a muzzle velocity of 2,359 ft/s (719 m/s). This raised the number of crewmen to 652 and later to 741.

=== Armour ===
The armour scheme of the Fuji-class ships was similar to that used by the Royal Sovereigns except that the Japanese ships used superior Harvey armour of the same thickness instead of compound armour. The waterline main belt was 8 feet (2.4 m) high, 3 feet (0.9 m) of which was above the waterline at normal load, and had a maximum thickness of 18 inches (457 mm). It reduced to 16 inches (406 mm) then 14 inches (356 mm) at the ends past the two barbettes; above it was a 4-inch (102 mm) strake of armour that ran between the barbettes. They were 14 inches thick outside the upper armour belt and reduced to 9 inches (229 mm) behind the upper belt. Diagonal bulkheads connected the barbettes to the side armour; the forward bulkhead was 14 inches thick while the rear bulkhead was 12 inches (305 mm) thick. The armour of the casemates and the barbette hoods had a maximum thickness of 6 inches while the conning tower was protected by 14 inches of armour. The deck armour was 2.5 inches (64 mm) thick and met the sides of the ship at the top of the main armour belt.

== Ships ==
Construction data
| Ship | Builder | Laid down | Launched | Completed | Cost | Fate |
|---|---|---|---|---|---|---|
| Fuji | Thames Iron Works, Leamouth, London | 1 August 1894 | 31 March 1896 | 17 August 1897 | ¥10,380,000 | Broken up, 1948 |
| Yashima | Armstrong Whitworth, Elswick | 6 December 1894 | 28 December 1896 | 9 September 1897 | ¥10,500,000 | Foundered, 15 May 1904 after hitting a mine |

== Service ==
Both ships had reached Japan by February 1898. At the start of the Russo-Japanese War in 1904, Fuji and Yashima were assigned to the 1st Division of the 1st Fleet. They participated in the Battle of Port Arthur on 9 February, when Admiral Tōgō Heihachirō led the 1st Fleet in an attack on the Russian ships of the Pacific Squadron anchored just outside Port Arthur. Tōgō chose to attack the Russian coastal defences with his main armament and engage the Russian ships with his secondary guns. Splitting his fire proved to be a poor decision as his eight-inch (203 mm) and six-inch guns inflicted very little damage on the Russian vessels, which concentrated all their fire on the Japanese ships. Yashima was not struck during the battle, but Fuji was hit twice, two men being killed and 10 wounded.

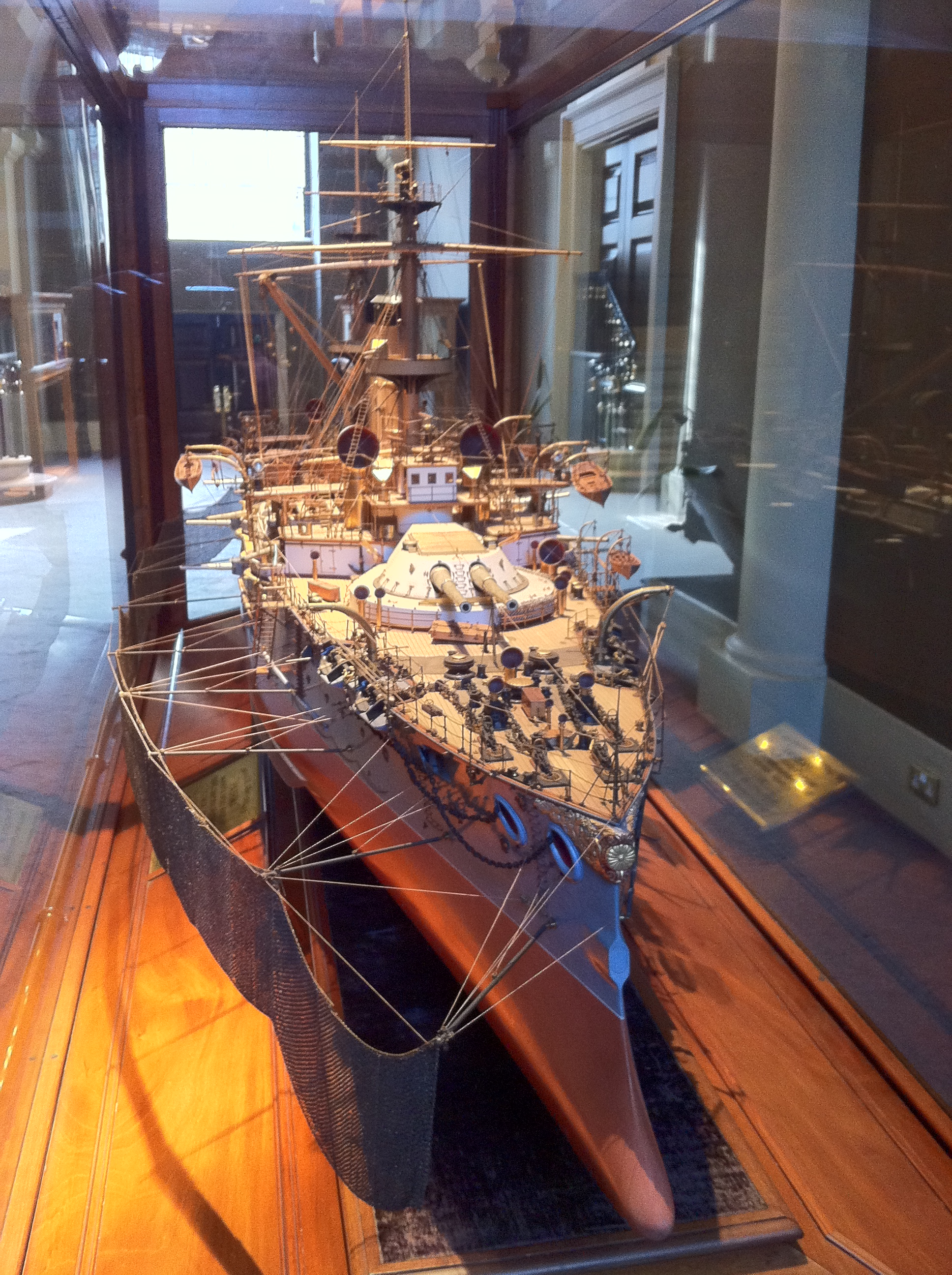
Model of Yashima with her torpedo nets deployed, National Maritime Museum, London

On 10 March, the two ships blindly (without being able to see the target) bombarded the harbour of Port Arthur from Pigeon Bay, on the southwest side of the Liaodong Peninsula, at a range of 9.5 kilometres (5.9 mi), but did little damage. When they tried again on 22 March, they were attacked by Russian coastal defence guns that had been transferred there, and also from several Russian ships in Port Arthur using observers overlooking Pigeon Bay. The Japanese ships disengaged after Fuji was hit by a 12-inch shell.

Fuji and Yashima participated in the action of 13 April when Tōgō successfully lured out two battleships of the Pacific Squadron. When the Russians spotted the five battleships of the 1st Division, they turned back for Port Arthur and the battleship Petropavlovsk struck a minefield laid by the Japanese the previous night. The ship sank in less than two minutes after one of her magazines exploded. Emboldened by his success, Tōgō resumed long-range bombardment missions, which prompted the Russians to lay more minefields.

On 14 May, the battleships Hatsuse, Shikishima, and Yashima, the protected cruiser Kasagi, and the dispatch boat Tatsuta put to sea to relieve the Japanese blockading force off Port Arthur. The following morning, the squadron encountered a Russian minefield. Hatsuse struck one mine that disabled her steering and Yashima struck two others when moving to assist Hatsuse. Yashima was towed away from the minefield, but she was still taking on water at an uncontrollable rate and the crew abandoned ship some five hours later. Kasagi took Yashima in tow, but the battleship's list continued to increase and she capsized about three hours later.

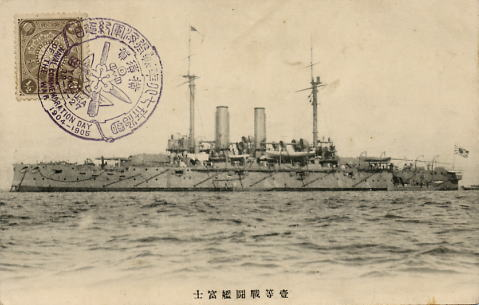
A postcard of Fuji in 1905

During the Battle of the Yellow Sea in August, Fuji was not damaged because the Russian ships concentrated their fire on Tōgō's flagship, the battleship Mikasa, which was leading the column. In May the following year, during the Battle of Tsushima, Fuji was hit a dozen times, the most serious of which penetrated the hood of the rear barbette, ignited some exposed propellant charges, killed eight men and wounded nine. After the ammunition fire was put out, the left gun in the barbette resumed firing and apparently delivered the coup de grâce that sank the battleship Borodino.

On 23 October 1908, Fuji hosted a dinner for the American Ambassador, Thomas J. O'Brien, and the senior officers of the Great White Fleet during its circumnavigation of the world. In 1910, her cylindrical boilers were replaced by Miyabara water-tube boilers and her main armament was replaced by Japanese-built guns. Fuji was reclassified as a first-class coast defence ship the same year, and undertook training duties in various capacities until disarmed in 1922. Her hulk continued to be used as a floating barracks and training centre at Yokosuka until 1945. Fuji was damaged by American carrier aircraft during their 18 July 1945 attack on Yokosuka and capsized after the end of World War II. The ship was scrapped in 1948.
