= Japanese battleship Fuji =

Imperial Japanese Navy's battleship

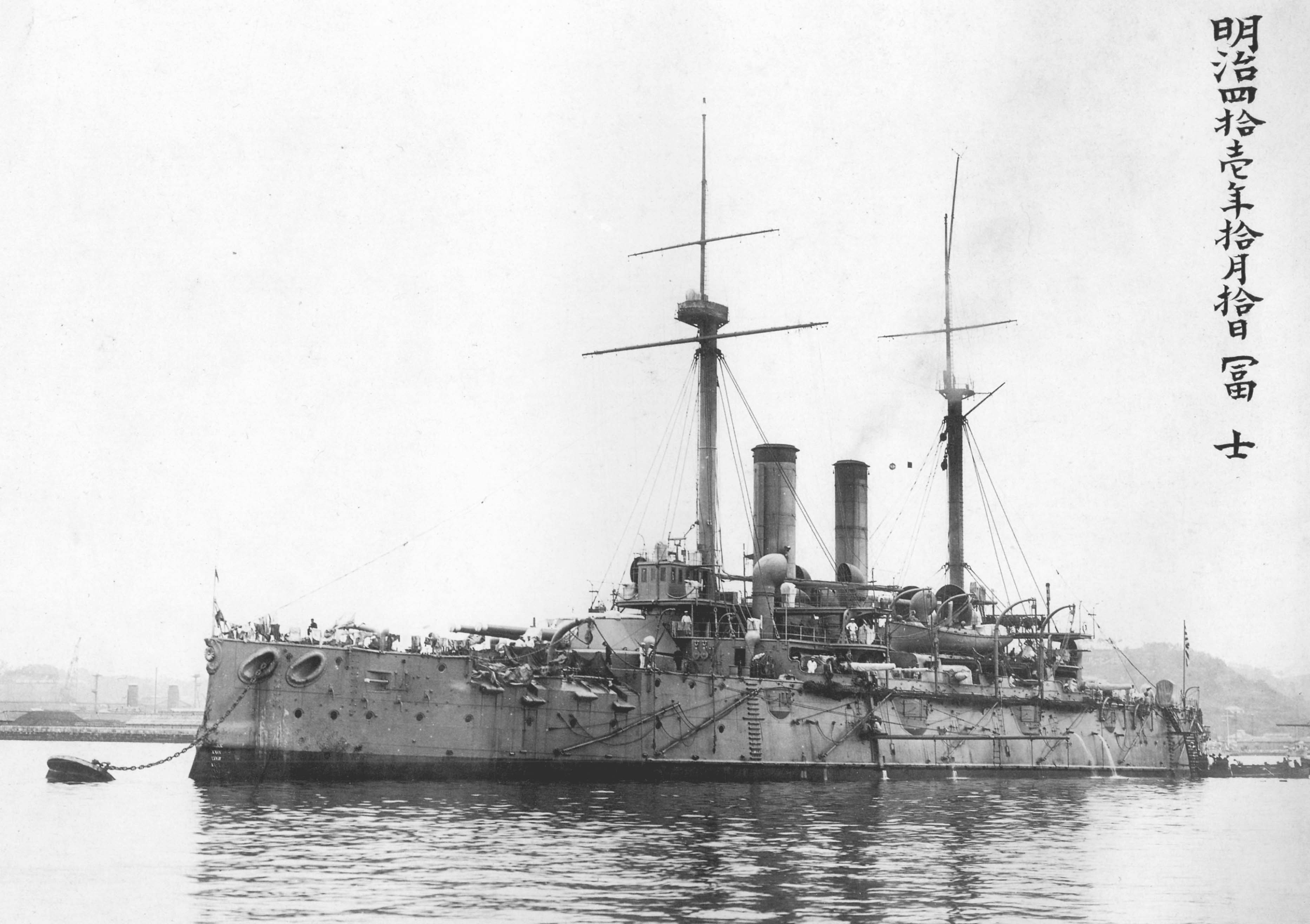
- Fuji at anchor, 1908

History

Empire of Japan
- Name: Fuji
- Namesake: Mount Fuji
- Ordered: 1894
- Builder: Thames Iron Works, Blackwall, London
- Laid down: 1 August 1894
- Launched: 31 March 1896
- Commissioned: 8 August 1897
- Decommissioned: 1923
- Reclassified: 1 September 1922 as training hulk and barracks
- Stricken: 1 September 1922
- Fate: Scrapped 1948

General characteristics
- Class & type: Fuji-class pre-dreadnought battleship
- Displacement: 12,230 long tons (12,430 t) (normal)
- Length: 412 ft (125.6 m)
- Beam: 73 ft 6 in (22.4 m)
- Draught: 26 ft 3 in (8.0 m)
- Installed power: 13,500 ihp (10,100 kW); 10 cylindrical boilers
- Propulsion: 2 shafts, 2 triple-expansion steam engines
- Speed: 18 knots (33 km/h; 21 mph)
- Range: 4,000 nmi (7,400 km; 4,600 mi) at 10 knots (19 km/h; 12 mph)
- Complement: 650
- Armament: 2 × twin 12 in (305 mm) guns; 10 × single 6 in (152 mm) guns; 20 × single 3-pdr guns; 4 × single 2.5-pdr guns; 5 × 18-inch torpedo tubes
- Armour: Harvey armour; Belt: 14–18 in (356–457 mm); Deck: 2.5 in (64 mm); Gun turrets: 6 in (152 mm)

Fuji (富士) was the lead ship of the Fuji class of pre-dreadnought battleships built for the Imperial Japanese Navy by the British firm of Thames Iron Works in the late 1890s. The ship participated in the Russo-Japanese War of 1904–1905, including the Battle of Port Arthur on the second day of the war with her sister Yashima. Fuji fought in the Battles of the Yellow Sea and Tsushima and was lightly damaged in the latter action. The ship was reclassified as a coastal defence ship in 1910 and served as a training ship for the rest of her career. She was hulked in 1922 and finally broken up for scrap in 1948.

== Design and description ==
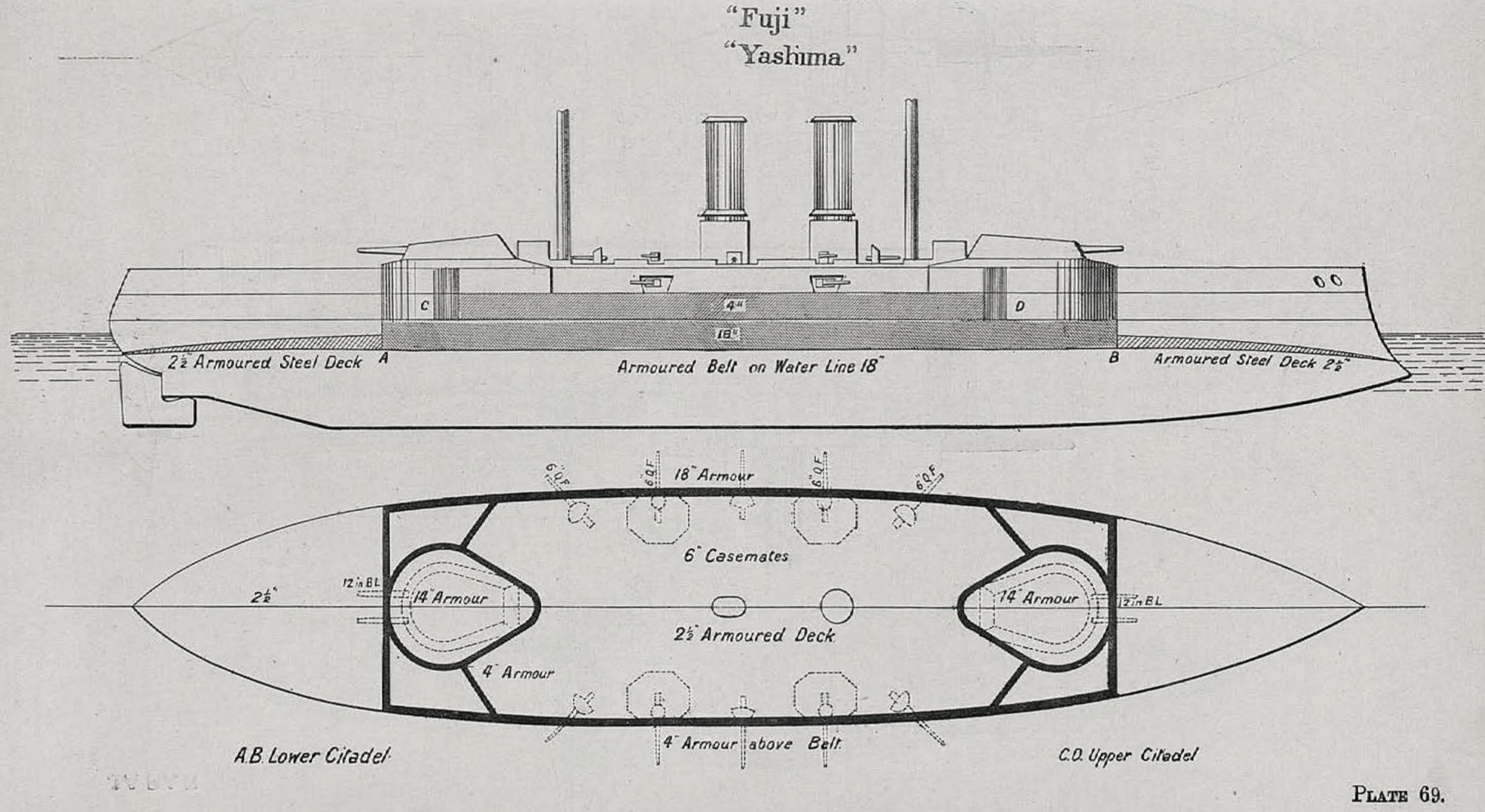
Right elevation and plan from Brassey's Naval Annual, 1896

The two Fuji-class ships were the IJN's first battleships, ordered from Britain in response to two new German-built Chinese ironclad warships. At this time, Japan lacked the technology and capability to construct its own battleships and they had to be built abroad. The ships were designed by Philip Watts as smaller versions of the British Royal Sovereign class, although they were slightly faster and had a better type of armour. Fuji was 412 feet (125.6 m) long overall and had a beam of 73 feet 6 inches (22.4 m) and a full-load draught of 26 feet 3 inches (8.0 m). She normally displaced 12,533 long tons (12,734 t) and had a crew of 637 officers and enlisted men. The ship was powered by two Humphrys Tennant vertical triple-expansion steam engines using steam generated by 10 cylindrical boilers. The engines were rated at 13,500 indicated horsepower (10,100 kW), using forced draught, and designed to reach a top speed of around 18 knots (33 km/h; 21 mph). Fuji, however, reached a top speed of 18.5 knots (34.3 km/h; 21.3 mph) on her sea trials. She carried a maximum of 1,200 tonnes (1,200 long tons) of coal which allowed her to steam for 4,000 nautical miles (7,400 km; 4,600 mi) at a speed of 10 knots (19 km/h; 12 mph).

The ship's main battery consisted of four 12-inch (305 mm) guns mounted in two twin gun turrets, one forward and one aft. The secondary battery consisted of ten 6-inch (152 mm) quick-firing guns, four mounted in casemates on the sides of the hull and six mounted on the upper deck, protected by gun shields. A number of smaller guns were carried for defence against torpedo boats. These included fourteen 47-millimetre (1.9 in) 3-pounder guns and ten 2.5-pounder Hotchkiss guns of the same calibre. (Note: Sources differ significantly on the exact outfit of light guns. Naval historians Roger Chesneau and Eugene Kolesnik cite 20 three and four 2.5-pounders. Jentschura, Jung & Mickel give a total of twenty-four 47 mm guns, without dividing them between the 3 and 2.5-pounders, while Silverstone says that they had only twenty 47 mm guns, again without splitting them.) She was also armed with five 18-inch torpedo tubes. Fuji's waterline armour belt consisted of Harvey armour and was 14–18 inches (356–457 mm) thick. The armour of her gun turrets was six inches thick and her deck was 2.5 inches (64 mm) thick.

== Construction and career ==
Fuji, named after Mount Fuji, was ordered as part of the 1894 Naval Programme and the ship was laid down by Thames Iron Works at their Blackwall, London shipyard on 1 August 1894. The ship was launched on 31 March 1896 and completed on 17 August 1897. The work was supervised by a team of over 240 engineers and naval officers from Japan, including future Prime Ministers Saitō Makoto and Katō Tomosaburō. While fitting out at Portland, she participated in the fleet review marking Queen Victoria's Diamond Jubilee on 26 June 1897 at Spithead before departing for Japan via the Suez Canal.

In 1901, the ship exchanged 16 of her 47 mm guns for an equal number of QF 12 pounder 12 cwt (Note: "cwt" is the abbreviation for hundredweight, 12 cwt referring to the weight of the gun.) guns. This raised the number of crewmen to 652 and later to 741.

At the start of the Russo-Japanese War, Fuji, commanded by Captain Matsumoto Kazu, was assigned to the 1st Division of the 1st Fleet. She participated in the Battle of Port Arthur on 9 February 1904 when Admiral Tōgō Heihachirō led the 1st Fleet in an attack on the Russian ships of the Pacific Squadron anchored just outside Port Arthur. Tōgō had expected his surprise night attack on the Russians by his destroyers to be much more successful than it actually was and expected to find them badly disorganized and weakened, but the Russians had recovered from their surprise and were ready for his attack. The Japanese ships were spotted by the Boyarin which was patrolling offshore and alerted the Russian defences. Tōgō chose to attack the Russian coastal defences with his main armament and engage the Russian ships with his secondary guns. Splitting his fire proved to be a bad idea as the Japanese 8-inch (203 mm) and six-inch guns inflicted very little significant damage on the Russian ships who concentrated all their fire on the Japanese ships with some effect. Although a large number of ships on both sides were hit, Russian casualties numbered only 17 while the Japanese suffered 60 killed and wounded before Tōgō disengaged. Fuji was hit by two shells during the battle that killed two and wounded 10 crewmen.

On 10 March, Fuji and her sister Yashima, under the command of Rear Admiral Nashiba Tokioki, blindly bombarded the harbour of Port Arthur from Pigeon Bay, on the southwest side of the Liaodong Peninsula, at a range of 9.5 kilometres (5.9 mi). They fired 154 twelve-inch shells, but did little damage. When they tried again on 22 March, they were attacked by Russian coast defence guns that had been transferred there by the new Russian commander, Vice Admiral Stepan Makarov, and also from several Russian ships in Port Arthur using observers overlooking Pigeon Bay. The Japanese ships disengaged after Fuji was hit by a 12-inch shell.

Fuji participated in the action of 13 April when Tōgō successfully lured out a portion of the Pacific Squadron, including Makarov's flagship, the battleship Petropavlovsk. When Makarov spotted the six battleships of the 1st Division, he turned back for Port Arthur and Petropavlovsk struck a minefield laid by the Japanese the previous night. The Russian battleship sank in less than two minutes after one of her magazines exploded, Makarov one of the 677 killed. Emboldened by his success, Tōgō resumed long-range bombardment missions, which prompted the Russians to lay more minefields.

During the Battle of the Yellow Sea in August, Fuji was not hit because the Russian ships concentrated their fire on the leading ship of the column, Tōgō's flagship, the battleship Mikasa. During the Battle of Tsushima in May 1905, she was hit a dozen times; the most serious of which penetrated the hood of the rear barbette, ignited some exposed propellant charges and killed eight men and wounded nine. After the ammunition fire was put out, the left gun in the barbette resumed firing and apparently fired the coup de grâce that sank the battleship Borodino.

On 23 October 1908, Fuji hosted a dinner for the American Ambassador and the seniormost officers of the Great White Fleet during their circumnavigation of the world. In 1910, her cylindrical boilers were replaced by Miyabara water-tube boilers and her main armament was replaced by Japanese-built guns. Fuji was reclassified as a first-class coast defence ship that same year, and was used for training duties in various capacities until disarmed in 1922. She spent all of World War I based at Kure. Her hulk continued to be used as a floating barracks and training center at Yokosuka until 1945. Fuji was damaged by American carrier aircraft during their 18 July 1945 attack on Yokosuka and capsized after the end of the war. The ship was scrapped in 1948.
