= Shikishima-class battleship =

Japanese battleship class

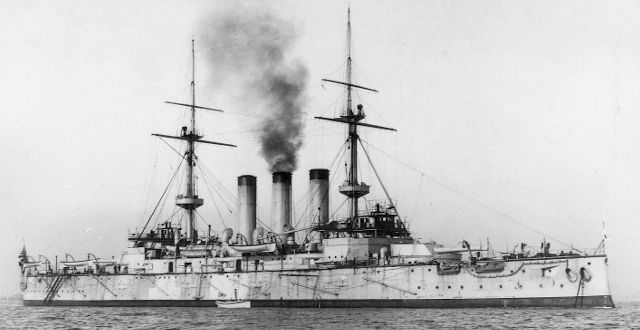
- Shikishima in 1905

Class overview
- Builders: Armstrong Whitworth; Thames Ironworks
- Operators: Imperial Japanese Navy
- Preceded by: Fuji class
- Succeeded by: Asahi
- Built: 1898–1901
- In commission: 1900–1922
- Completed: 2
- Lost: 1
- Scrapped: 1

General characteristics
- Type: Pre-dreadnought battleship
- Displacement: 14,850–15,000 long tons (15,088–15,241 t) (normal)
- Length: 438 ft (133.5 m)
- Beam: 75.5–76.75 ft (23.0–23.4 m)
- Draught: 27–27.25 ft (8.2–8.3 m)
- Installed power: 25 Belleville boilers; 14,500 ihp (10,800 kW)
- Propulsion: 2 shafts, 2 triple-expansion steam engines
- Speed: 18 knots (33 km/h; 21 mph)
- Range: 5,000 nmi (9,300 km; 5,800 mi) at 10 knots (19 km/h; 12 mph)
- Complement: 741; 849 as flagship
- Armament: 2 × twin 12 in (305 mm) guns; 14 × single 6 in (152 mm) guns; 20 × single 12-pdr (3 in (76 mm))guns; 8 × single 3-pdr (1.9 in (47 mm)) guns; 4 × single 2.5-pdr (1.9 in (47 mm)) Hotchkiss guns; 4 × 18 in (450 mm) torpedo tubes
- Armour: Harvey armour; Belt: 4–9 in (102–229 mm); Deck: 2.5–4 in (64–102 mm); Gun turrets: 10 in (254 mm); Conning tower: 3–14 in (76–356 mm); Bulkheads: 6–14 in (152–356 mm)

The Shikishima class (敷島型戦艦, Shikishima-gata senkan) was a two-ship class of pre-dreadnought battleships built for the Imperial Japanese Navy in the late 1890s. As Japan lacked the industrial capacity to build such warships itself, they were designed and built in the UK. The ships participated in the Russo-Japanese War of 1904–1905, including the Battle of Port Arthur on the second day of the war. Hatsuse sank after striking two mines off Port Arthur in May 1904. Shikishima fought in the Battles of the Yellow Sea and Tsushima and was lightly damaged in the latter action, although shells prematurely exploded in the barrels of her main guns in each battle. The ship was reclassified as a coast defence ship in 1921 and served as a training ship for the rest of her career. She was disarmed and hulked in 1923 and finally broken up for scrap in 1948.

== Design and description ==
Combat experience in the First Sino-Japanese War convinced the Imperial Japanese Navy of weaknesses in the Jeune Ecole naval philosophy, and Japan embarked on a program to modernize and expand its fleet. As with the earlier Fuji-class battleships, Japan lacked the technology and capability to construct its own battleships, and turned again to the United Kingdom. They were ordered as part of the Ten Year Naval Expansion Programme and paid for from the £30,000,000 indemnity paid by China after losing the Sino-Japanese War of 1894–1895.

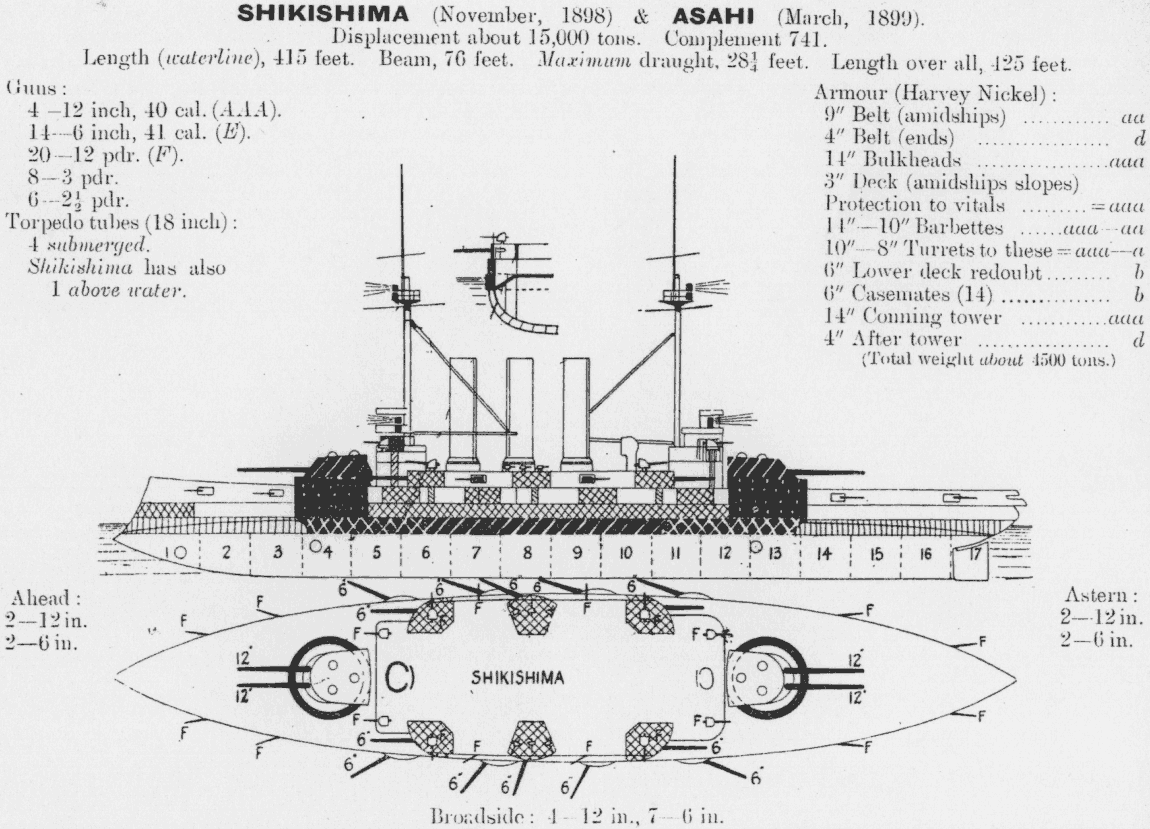
Left elevation and deck plan as depicted in Jane's Fighting Ships 1906

The design of the Shikishima class was a modified and improved version of the Majestic-class battleships of the Royal Navy. They had the same armament and similar machinery as the Fuji class which was intended to allow them to work together as a homogenous group. The Shikishima-class ships had an overall length of 412 feet (125.6 m), a beam of 75.5–76.75 feet (23.0–23.4 m), and a normal draught of 26.25–26.5 feet (8.0–8.1 m). They displaced 14,850–15,000 long tons (15,090–15,240 t) at normal load. The hull had a double bottom and was subdivided into 261 watertight compartments. The crew numbered about 741 officers and ratings, although this increased to 849 when serving as a flagship.

=== Propulsion ===
The ships were powered by two Humphrys Tennant vertical triple-expansion steam engines, each driving one propeller, using steam generated by 25 Belleville boilers. The engines were rated at 14,500 indicated horsepower (10,800 kW), using forced draught, and designed to reach a top speed of 18 knots (33 km/h; 21 mph) although they proved to be faster during their sea trials. Shikishima reached a speed of 19 knots (35 km/h; 22 mph) using 14,667 indicated horsepower (10,937 kW). The ships carried a maximum of 1,643 tonnes (1,617 long tons) of coal which allowed them to steam for 5,000 nautical miles (9,300 km; 5,800 mi) at a speed of 10 knots (19 km/h; 12 mph).

=== Armament ===
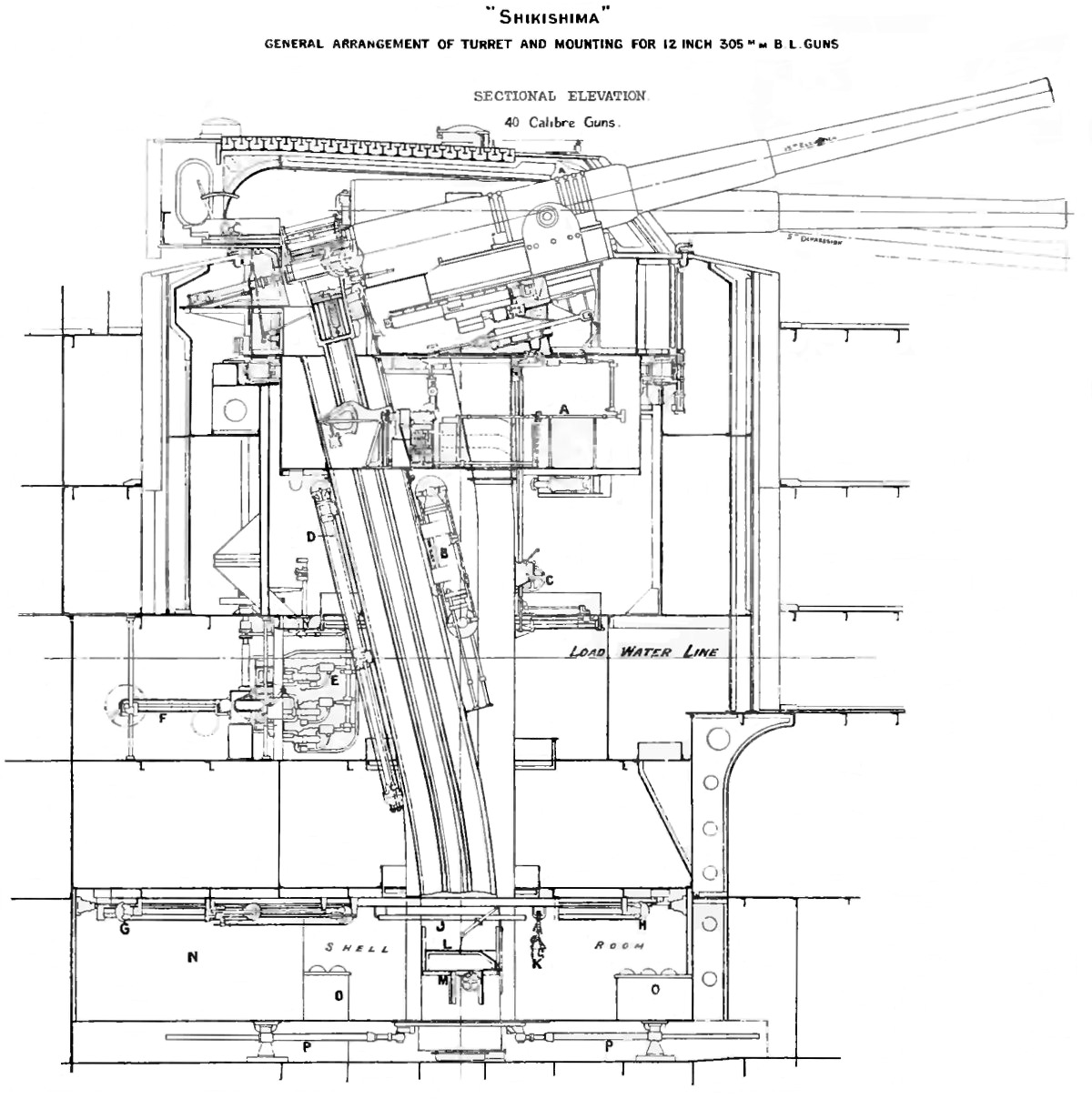
Right elevation of 12 inch gun turret & ammunition hoists

The main battery of the Shikishima class consisted of the same four Elswick Ordnance Company 40-calibre twelve-inch guns as used in the Fuji class. They were mounted in twin-gun barbettes fore and aft of the superstructure that had armoured hoods to protect the guns and were usually called gun turrets. The hydraulically powered mountings could be loaded at all angles of traverse while the guns were loaded at a fixed angle of +13.5°. They fired 850-pound (386 kg) projectiles at a muzzle velocity of 2,400 ft/s (730 m/s).

Secondary armament of the Shikishima class consisted of fourteen 40-calibre Type 41 six-inch quick-firing guns mounted in casemates. Eight of these guns were positioned on the main deck on the side of the ship's hull and the other six guns were placed in the superstructure. They fired 100-pound (45 kg) shells at a muzzle velocity of 2,300 ft/s (700 m/s). Protection against torpedo boat attacks was provided by twenty QF 12-pounder 12 cwt (Note: "Cwt" is the abbreviation for hundredweight, 12 cwt referring to the weight of the gun.) guns and four 47-millimetre (1.9 in) 2.5-pounder Hotchkiss guns. The 12-pounders fired 3-inch (76 mm), 12.5-pound (5.7 kg) projectiles at a muzzle velocity of 2,359 ft/s (719 m/s). The ships were also equipped with four submerged 18-inch torpedo tubes, two on each broadside.

=== Armour ===
The waterline main belt of the Shikishima-class vessels consisted of Harvey armour 8 feet (2.4 m) high, 3 feet 7 inches (1.1 m) of which was above the waterline at normal load, and had a maximum thickness of 9 inches (229 mm) for the middle 220 feet (67 m) of the ship. It was only 4 inches (102 mm) thick at the ends of the ship and was surmounted by a six-inch strake of armor that ran between the barbettes for 220 feet. The barbettes were 14 inches (356 mm) thick, but reduced to 10 inches (254 mm) at the level of the lower deck. The armour of the barbette hoods had a maximum thickness of 10 inches (254 mm) while their roofs were three inches thick. Diagonal bulkheads 12–14 inches (305–356 mm) thick connected the barbettes to the side armor, but the bulkheads were only six inches thick at the lower deck level. The casemates protecting the secondary armament were also six inches thick. The flat portion of the deck armour was 2.5 inches (64 mm) thick and four inches thick where it sloped down to the bottom of the armour belt. This significantly improved the ships' protection as any shell that penetrated their vertical armour also had to penetrate the sloping deck before it could reach the machinery compartments or magazines. Outside the central armoured citadel, the sloped deck had a thickness of 2 inches (51 mm). The forward conning tower was protected by 14 inches of armour, but the aft conning tower only had three inches of armour.

== Ships ==
Construction data
Ship	Builder	Laid down	Launched	Commissioned	Fate
Shikishima	Thames Iron Works, Leamouth, London	29 March 1897	1 November 1898	26 January 1900	Broken up, January 1948
Hatsuse	Armstrong, Elswick	10 January 1898	27 June 1899	18 January 1901	Sank 15 May 1904 after hitting two mines

At the start of the Russo-Japanese War, Hatsuse and Shikishima were assigned to the 1st Division of the 1st Fleet. They participated in the Battle of Port Arthur on 9 February 1904 when Admiral Tōgō Heihachirō led the 1st Fleet in an attack on the Russian ships of the Pacific Squadron anchored just outside Port Arthur. Tōgō chose to attack the Russian coastal defences with his main armament and engage the Russian ships with his secondary guns. Splitting his fire proved to be a bad idea as the Japanese 8-inch (203 mm) and six-inch guns inflicted very little damage on the Russian ships who concentrated all their fire on the Japanese ships with some effect. Hatsuse was hit twice during the battle, 10 men being killed and 17 wounded, but Shikishima was only hit once with 17 men wounded.

Both ships participated in the action of 13 April when Tōgō successfully lured out two battleships of the Pacific Squadron. When the Russians spotted the five battleships of the 1st Division, they turned back for Port Arthur and the battleship Petropavlovsk struck a minefield laid by the Japanese the previous night. It sank in less than two minutes after one of her magazines exploded. Emboldened by his success, Tōgō resumed long-range bombardment missions, which prompted the Russians to lay more minefields.

On 14 May, Hatsuse, Shikishima, and the battleship Yashima, the protected cruiser Kasagi, and the dispatch boat Tatsuta put to sea to relieve the Japanese blockading force off Port Arthur. On the following morning, the squadron encountered a newly laid Russian minefield. Hatsuse struck one mine that disabled her steering and Yashima struck another when moving to assist Hatsuse. Hatsuse struck another mine while drifting about a half-hour later that detonated one of her magazines and the ship sank in a little over a minute. The catastrophe claimed 496 crewmen although the escorting ships were able to rescue 336 men.

Shikishima was not hit during the Battle of the Yellow Sea in August, although a shell exploded prematurely in one of her 12-inch guns, disabling it. During the Battle of Tsushima in May 1905, she was hit nine times; the most serious of which penetrated beneath a six-inch gun, killing or wounding the entire gun crew. Again the ship had another 12-inch shell prematurely detonate in one of the forward guns, wrecking it completely. Shikishima was reclassified as a first-class coast defence ship in September 1921, and was used for training duties in various capacities until disarmed and reclassified as a transport in 1923. Her hulk continued to be used as a training ship until she was scrapped in 1948.
