= Japanese battleship Hatsuse =

Japanese Shikishima-class battleship

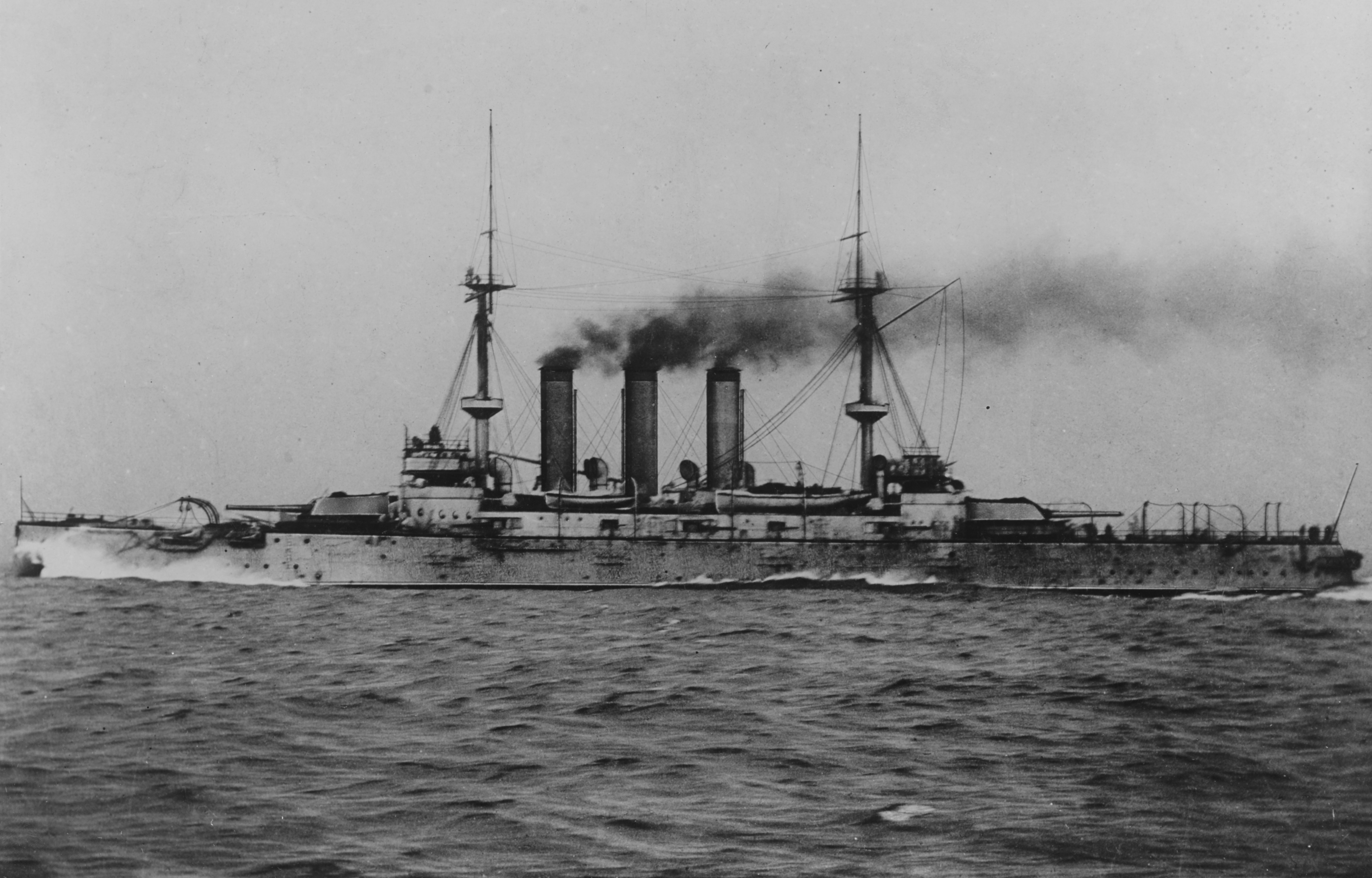
- Hatsuse at sea

History

Japan
- Name: Hatsuse
- Ordered: 1897
- Builder: Armstrong Whitworth, Elswick
- Yard number: 680
- Laid down: 10 January 1898
- Launched: 27 June 1899
- Completed: 18 January 1901
- Fate: Sank 15 May 1904 after striking a mine

General characteristics
- Class & type: Shikishima-class pre-dreadnought battleship
- Displacement: 14,312 long tons (14,542 t) (normal)
- Length: 438 ft 8 in (133.7 m)
- Beam: 76 ft 6 in (23.3 m)
- Draught: 27 ft 5 in (8.4 m)
- Installed power: 14,500 ihp (10,800 kW); 25 Belleville boilers
- Propulsion: 2 shafts, 2 triple-expansion steam engines
- Speed: 18 knots (33 km/h; 21 mph)
- Range: 5,000 nmi (9,300 km; 5,800 mi) at 10 knots (19 km/h; 12 mph)
- Complement: 849 (as flagship)
- Armament: 2 × twin 12 in (305 mm) guns; 14 × single 6 in (152 mm) guns; 20 × single 12-pdr (3 in (76 mm)) guns; 8 × single 3-pdr (47 mm (1.9 in)) guns; 4 × single 2.5-pdr (47 mm (1.9 in)) guns; 4 × 18 in (450 mm) torpedo tubes
- Armour: Harvey armour; Belt: 4–9 in (102–229 mm); Deck: 2.5–4 in (64–102 mm); Gun turrets: 10 in (254 mm)

Hatsuse (初瀬, Hatsuse) was a Shikishima-class pre-dreadnought battleship built for the Imperial Japanese Navy (IJN) in the late 1890s. As Japan lacked the industrial capacity to build such warships, the ship was designed and built in the United Kingdom. She participated in the early stages of the Russo-Japanese War of 1904–1905, including the Battle of Port Arthur on the second day of the war, as the flagship of the 1st Division. Hatsuse was involved in the subsequent naval operations until she sank in a Russian minefield off Port Arthur on 15 May 1904 after the ship struck two mines. The ship struck one mine which caused significant damage. Less than two hours later, the ship struck a second mine which detonated one of her magazines and Hatsuse sank almost immediately afterwards with the loss of over half her crew.

== Description ==
The Shikishima class was an improved version of the Majestic-class battleships of the United Kingdom's Royal Navy. At this time, Japan lacked the technology and capability to construct its own battleships and they had to be built abroad. Hatsuse was 438 feet 8 inches (133.7 m) long overall and had a beam of 76 feet 6 inches (23.3 m) and a draught of 27 feet 5 inches (8.4 m) at deep load. She displaced 14,312 long tons (14,542 t) at normal load and had a crew of 849 officers and ratings when serving as a flagship. The ship was powered by two Humphrys Tennant vertical triple-expansion steam engines, each driving one shaft, using steam provided by 25 Belleville boilers. The engines were rated at 14,500 indicated horsepower (10,800 kW) using forced draught and were designed to reach a top speed of 18 knots (33 km/h; 21 mph). Hatsuse, however, reached a maximum speed of 19.1 knots (35.4 km/h; 22.0 mph) from 16,117 ihp (12,018 kW) on her sea trials. She carried enough coal to give her a range of 5,000 nautical miles (9,300 km; 5,800 mi) at a speed of 10 knots (19 km/h; 12 mph).

The ships' main battery consisted of four 12-inch (305 mm) guns mounted in two twin gun turrets, one forward and one aft of the superstructure. Their secondary armament consisted of fourteen quick-firing (QF) 6-inch (152 mm) guns, mounted in casemates on the sides of the hull and in the superstructure. A suite of smaller guns were carried for defence against torpedo boats. These included twenty QF 12-pounder (3-inch (76 mm)) 12 cwt (Note: "Cwt" is the abbreviation for hundredweight, 12 cwt referring to the weight of the gun.) guns, eight 47-millimetre (1.9 in) 3-pounders and four 2.5-pounder Hotchkiss guns of the same calibre, all of which were in single mounts. They was also armed with four submerged 18-inch (450 mm) torpedo tubes, two on each broadside. The waterline armour belt of the Shikishima-class ships consisted of Harvey armour 4–9 inches (102–229 mm) thick. The armour of their gun turrets had a maximum thickness of 10 inches (254 mm) and their decks ranged from 2.5 to 4 inches (64 to 102 mm) in thickness.

== Construction and career ==
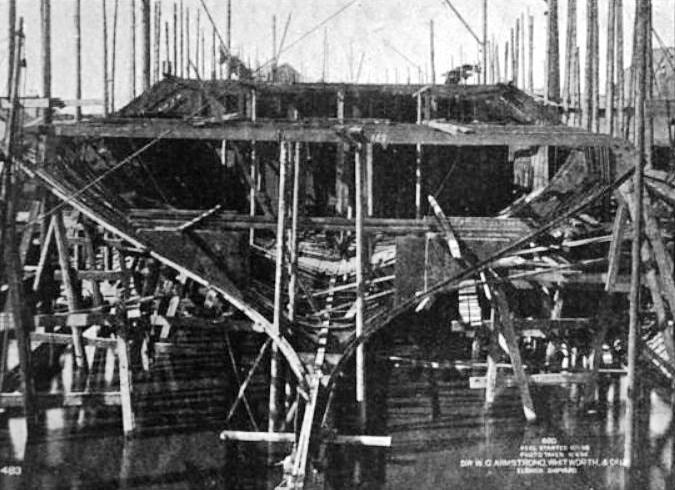
Hatsuse's hull under construction three months after her keel was laid

Its name comes from the old place name in Nara Prefecture, where Hase-dera Temple is located, and from the Hatsuse River. It was ordered as part of a 10-year Naval Expansion Programme paid for from the £30,000,000 indemnity paid by China after losing the Sino-Japanese War of 1894–1895. The ship was laid down by Armstrong Whitworth at their Elswick shipyard on 10 January 1898. She was launched on 27 June 1899 and completed on 18 January 1901. Before sailing to Japan, she represented the Meiji Emperor at Queen Victoria's funeral on 2 February. She arrived in Singapore on 28 March where she restocked with coal, received a change of paint from grey to black and then departed on 3 April bound for Yokosuka.

At the start of the Russo-Japanese War, Hatsuse, commanded by Captain Yu Nakao, was assigned to the 1st Division of the 1st Fleet and became the flagship of its commander, Rear-Admiral Nashiba Tokioki. She participated in the Battle of Port Arthur on 9 February 1904 when Vice-Admiral Tōgō Heihachirō led the 1st Fleet in an attack on the Russian ships of the Pacific Squadron anchored just outside Port Arthur. Tōgō had expected his surprise night attack on the Russians by his destroyers to be much more successful than it actually was and anticipated that they would be badly disorganised and weakened, but the Russians had recovered from their surprise and were ready for his attack. The Japanese ships were spotted by the cruiser Boyarin which was patrolling offshore and alerted the Russian defences. Tōgō chose to attack the Russian coastal defences with his main armament and engage the Russian ships with his secondary guns. Splitting his fire proved to be a bad idea as the Japanese eight-inch (203 mm) and six-inch guns inflicted little damage on the Russian ships who concentrated all their fire on the Japanese ships with some effect. Although a large number of ships on both sides were hit, Russian casualties numbered only 17 while the Japanese suffered 60 killed and wounded before Tōgō disengaged. Hatsuse was hit twice during the battle, losing seven crewmen killed and seventeen wounded.

Hatsuse participated in the action of 13 April when Tōgō successfully lured out a portion of the Pacific Squadron, including Vice-Admiral Stepan Makarov's flagship, the battleship Petropavlovsk. When Makarov spotted the five battleships of the 1st Division, he turned back for Port Arthur and Petropavlovsk struck a minefield laid by the Japanese the previous night. The Russian battleship sank in less than two minutes after one of her magazines exploded, with Makarov one of the 677 killed. Emboldened by his success, Tōgō resumed long-range bombardment missions, which prompted the Russians to lay more minefields.

On 14 May Nashiba put to sea with the battleships Hatsuse, Shikishima, and Yashima, the protected cruiser Kasagi, and the dispatch boat Tatsuta to relieve the Japanese blockading force off Port Arthur. On the following morning, the squadron encountered a minefield laid by the Russian minelayer Amur. Hatsuse struck one mine that disabled her steering at 10:50 and Yashima struck another when moving to assist Hatsuse. At 12:33 Hatsuse drifted onto another mine that detonated one of her magazines, killing 496 of her crew, and sinking the ship at 38°37′N 121°20′E. Tatsuta and Kasagi managed to save Nashiba and Nakao with 334 other officers and ratings. Yashima's flooding could not be controlled and she foundered about eight hours later, after her crew had abandoned ship.
