= Japanese battleship Shikishima =

Japanese lead ship of Shikishima-class

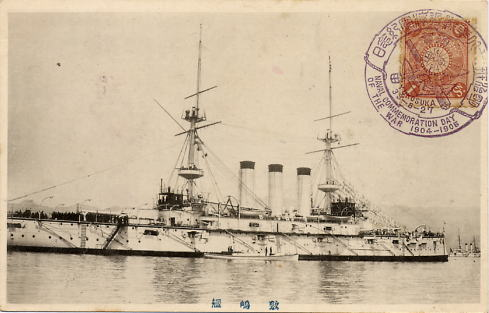
- Shikishima in a 1905 postcard

History

Japan
- Name: Shikishima
- Namesake: An old poetic name of Japan
- Ordered: 1897
- Builder: Thames Iron Works, Blackwall, London
- Laid down: 29 March 1897
- Launched: 1 November 1898
- Completed: 26 January 1900
- Reclassified: 1 April 1923 as transport and training ship
- Stricken: 1923
- Fate: Scrapped, January 1948

General characteristics
- Class & type: Shikishima-class pre-dreadnought battleship
- Displacement: 14,850 long tons (15,090 t) (normal)
- Length: 438 ft (133.5 m)
- Beam: 76 ft 6 in (23.3 m)
- Draught: 27 ft 3 in (8.3 m)
- Installed power: 25 Belleville boilers; 14,500 ihp (10,800 kW)
- Propulsion: 2 shafts, 2 triple-expansion steam engines
- Speed: 18 knots (33 km/h; 21 mph)
- Range: 5,000 nmi (9,300 km; 5,800 mi) at 10 knots (19 km/h; 12 mph)
- Complement: 741
- Armament: 2 × twin 12 in (305 mm) guns; 14 × single 6 in (152 mm) guns; 20 × single 12-pdr 3 in (76 mm) guns; 8 × single 3-pdr (1.9 in (47 mm)) guns; 4 × single 2.5-pdr (1.9 in (47 mm)) Hotchkiss guns; 4 × 18 in (450 mm) torpedo tubes
- Armour: Harvey armour; Belt: 4–9 in (102–229 mm); Deck: 2.5–4 in (64–102 mm); Gun turrets: 10 in (254 mm)

Shikishima (敷島) was the lead ship of her class of two pre-dreadnought battleships built for the Imperial Japanese Navy by British shipyards in the late 1890s. During the Russo-Japanese War of 1904–1905, the ship fought in the Battles of Port Arthur, the Yellow Sea and Tsushima and was lightly damaged in the latter action, although shells prematurely exploded in her main guns in the latter two engagements. Shikishima remained in home waters during World War I. She was reclassified as a coastal defence ship in 1921 and served as a training ship for the rest of her career. The ship was disarmed and hulked in 1923 and finally broken up for scrap in 1948.

== Description ==
Shikishima and her sister ship Hatsuse were designed in England as improved versions of the Royal Navy's Majestic-class battleships. At this time, Japan lacked the technology and capability to construct its own battleships and they had to be built abroad. Shikishima was 438 feet (133.5 m) long overall and had a beam of 75 feet 6 inches (23.0 m). She had a full-load draught of 27 feet 3 inches (8.3 m) and normally displaced 14,850 long tons (15,090 t) and had a crew of 741 officers and enlisted men. The ship was powered by two Humphrys Tennant vertical triple-expansion steam engines using steam generated by 25 Belleville boilers. The engines were rated at 14,500 indicated horsepower (10,800 kW), using forced draught, and were designed to reach a top speed of 18 knots (33 km/h; 21 mph). Shikishima, however, reached a top speed of 19 knots (35.2 km/h; 21.9 mph) from 14,667 ihp (10,937 kW) on her sea trials. She carried enough coals to give her a range of 5,000 nautical miles (9,300 km; 5,800 mi) at a speed of 10 knots (19 km/h; 12 mph).

The ship's main battery consisted of four 12-inch (305 mm) guns mounted in two twin gun turrets, one forward and one aft. The secondary battery consisted of fourteen 6-inch (152 mm) quick-firing guns, mounted in casemates on the sides of the hull and in the superstructure. A number of smaller guns were carried for defence against torpedo boats. These included 20 QF 12-pounder 12 cwt (Note: "Cwt" is the abbreviation for hundredweight, 20 cwt referring to the weight of the gun.) guns, six 47-millimetre (1.9 in) 3-pounder guns and six 47-millimetre 2.5-pounder Hotchkiss guns. She was also armed with four submerged 18-inch (450 mm) torpedo tubes. Shikishima's waterline armour belt consisted of Harvey armour and was 4–9 inches (102–229 mm) thick. The armour of her gun turrets had a maximum thickness of 10 inches (254 mm) and her deck ranged from 2.5 to 4 inches (64 to 102 mm) in thickness.

== Operational career ==
Shikishima, a poetical name for Japan, was one of four battleships ordered from overseas shipyards as part of the 10-year Naval Expansion Programme paid for from the £30,000,000 indemnity paid by China after losing the Sino-Japanese War of 1894–1895. The ship was laid down by Thames Iron Works at their Blackwall, London shipyard on 29 March 1897. She was launched on 1 November 1898 and completed on 26 January 1900. After her arrival in Japan, she was slightly damaged when she went ashore outside of Yokohama during a typhoon in September 1902.

=== Russo-Japanese War ===
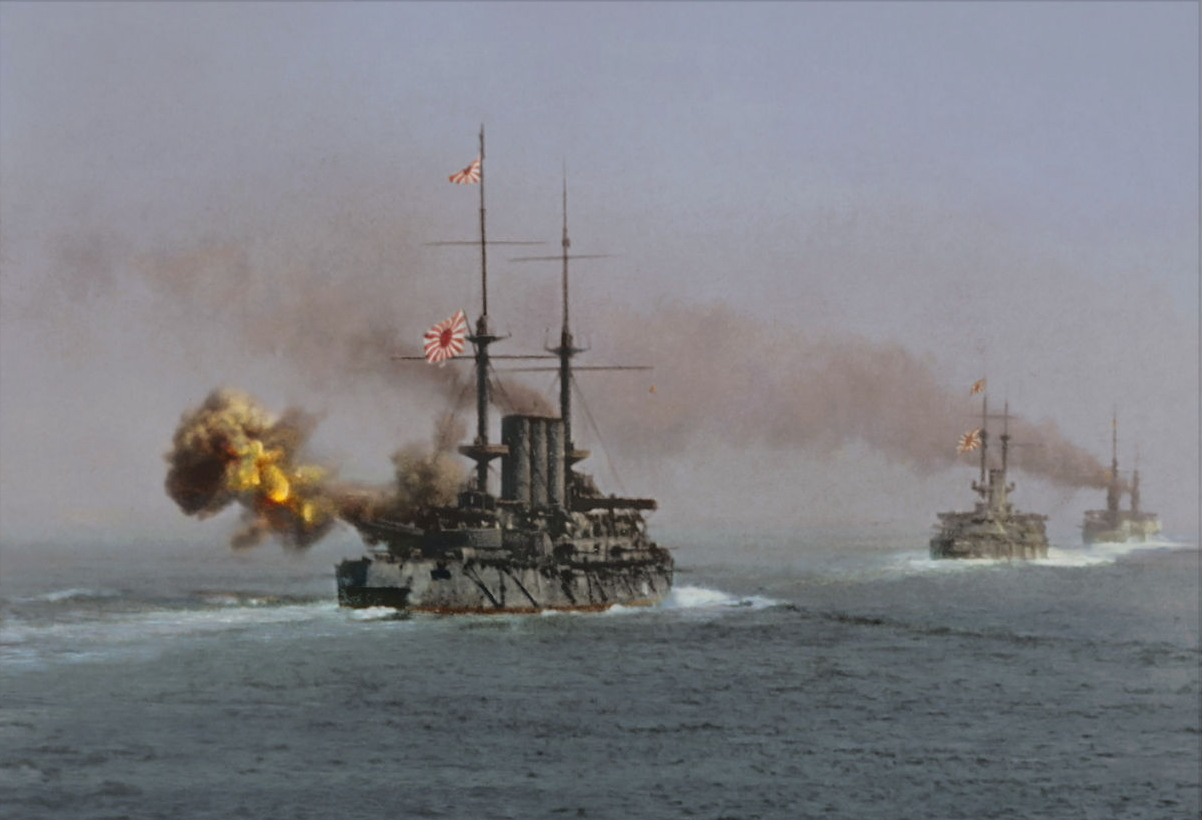
Colorized photo of Shikishima firing during the Battle of the Yellow Sea

At the start of the Russo-Japanese War, Shikishima, commanded by Captain Izō Teragaki, was assigned to the 1st Division of the 1st Fleet. She participated in the Battle of Port Arthur on 9 February 1904 when Vice-Admiral Tōgō Heihachirō led the 1st Fleet in an attack on the Russian ships of the Pacific Squadron anchored just outside Port Arthur. Tōgō had expected his surprise night attack on the Russians by his destroyers to be much more successful than it actually was and expected to find them badly disorganised and weakened, but the Russians had recovered from their surprise and were ready for his attack. The Japanese ships were spotted by the cruiser Boyarin which was patrolling offshore and alerted the Russian defences. Tōgō chose to attack the Russian coastal defences with his main armament and engage the Russian ships with his secondary guns. Splitting his fire proved to be ineffective as the Japanese eight-inch (203 mm) and six-inch guns inflicted very little significant damage on the Russian ships who concentrated all their fire on the Japanese ships with some effect. Although a large number of ships on both sides were hit, Russian casualties numbered only 17 while the Japanese suffered 60 killed and wounded before Tōgō disengaged. During the battle, Shikishima was hit by a single six-inch shell which wounded 17 crewmen.

Shikishima participated in the action of 13 April when Tōgō successfully lured out a portion of the Pacific Squadron, including Vice-Admiral Stepan Makarov's flagship, the battleship Petropavlovsk. When Makarov spotted the five battleships of the 1st Division, he turned back for Port Arthur and Petropavlovsk struck a naval mine laid by the Japanese the previous night. The Russian battleship sank in less than two minutes after one of her magazines exploded; Makarov was one of the 677 killed. Emboldened by his success, Tōgō resumed long-range bombardment missions, which prompted the Russians to lay more minefields.

On 14 May, Rear Admiral Nashiba Tokioki put to sea with the battleships Hatsuse (flag), Shikishima, and Yashima, the protected cruiser Kasagi, and the dispatch boat Tatsuta to relieve the Japanese blockading force off Port Arthur. On the following morning, the squadron encountered a minefield laid by the Russian minelayer Amur. Hatsuse struck one mine that disabled her steering at 10:50 and Yashima struck another when moving to assist Hatsuse. At 12:33, the latter drifted onto another mine that detonated one of her magazines, killing 496 of her crew and sinking the ship. Yashima's flooding could not be controlled and she foundered about eight hours later, after her crew had abandoned ship.

Shikishima as a disarmed training ship in the 1920s

Shikishima was not hit during the Battle of the Yellow Sea in August, although a shell exploded prematurely in one of her 12-inch guns, disabling it. During the Battle of Tsushima in May 1905, she was second in the line of battle of the First Division, following Tōgō's flagship Mikasa and was one of the main targets of the Russian battleships. Shikishima was hit nine times during the battle; the most serious of which penetrated beneath a six-inch gun, killing or wounding the entire gun crew. She also had another 12-inch shell prematurely detonate in one of her forward guns, wrecking it completely. In turn, Mikasa and Shikishima concentrated their fire on the battleship Oslyabya which eventually sank after two large-calibre shells blew large holes in her bow at the waterline. These caused massive flooding that sank her, the first modern battleship sunk entirely by gunfire. Shikishima fired a total of 74 twelve-inch, 1,395 six-inch and 1,272 twelve-pounder shells during the battle. She also fired a torpedo at the badly damaged armed merchant cruiser Ural that sank the Russian ship.

=== Later career ===
During World War I, Shikishima was based at Sasebo during 1914–1915 and was then assigned to the Second and Fifth Squadrons, in that order, for the rest of the war. After the Washington Naval Treaty was signed, she was reclassified as a first-class coast defence ship on 1 September 1921, and was used to train submarine crews until the ship was reclassified as a transport on 1 April 1923. Shikishima continued to be used as a training hulk for the Sasebo Naval Barracks until she was scrapped in January 1948 at the Sasebo Naval Arsenal.
