= Japanese battleship Yashima =

Japanese Fuji-class battleship

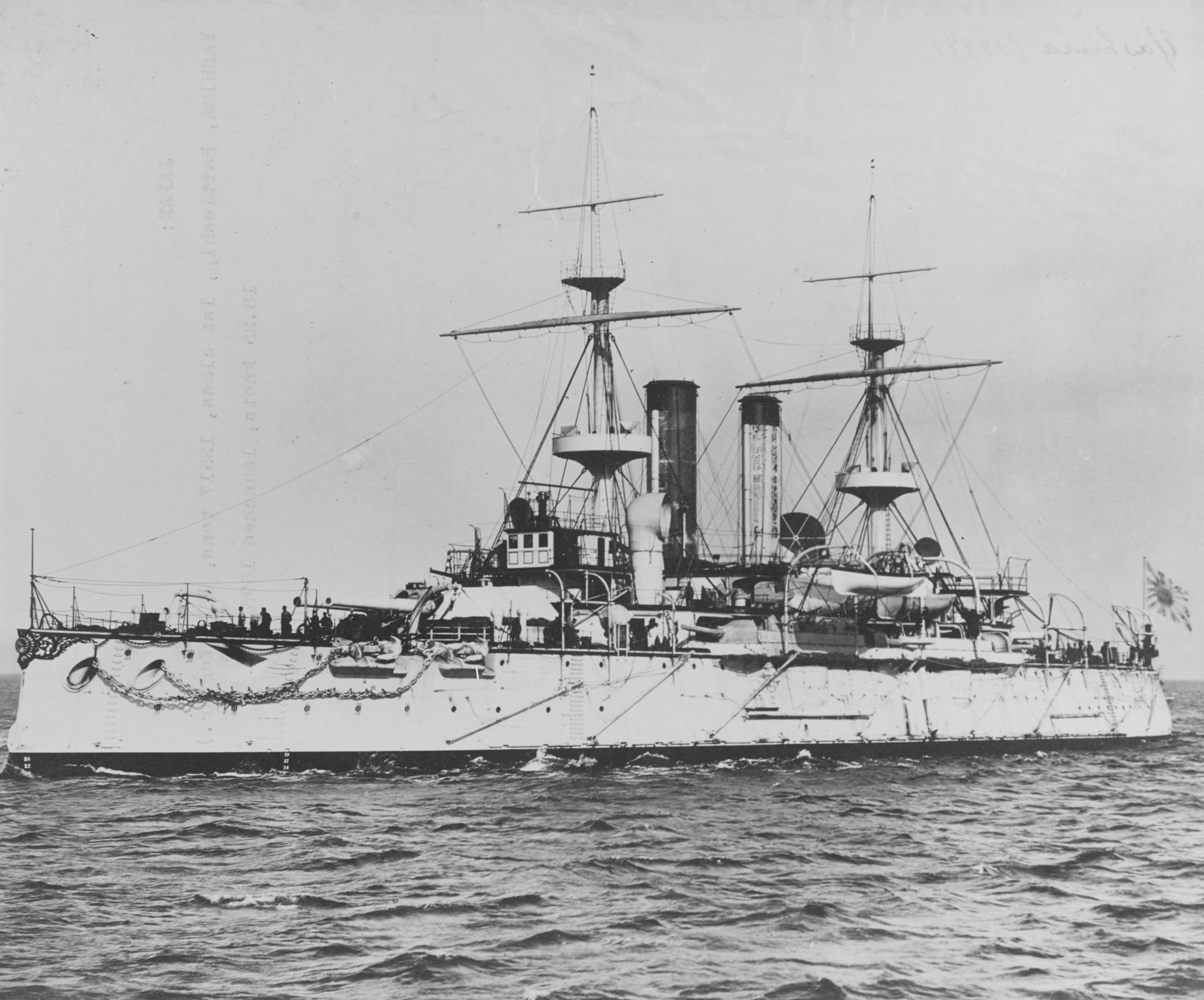
- Yashima before the Russo-Japanese War

History

Empire of Japan
- Name: Yashima
- Namesake: "Many Islands", a name for Japan
- Ordered: 1894 Naval Programme
- Builder: Armstrong Whitworth
- Cost: ¥10,500,000
- Yard number: 625
- Laid down: 6 December 1894
- Launched: 28 February 1896
- Completed: 9 September 1897
- Fate: Sank 15 May 1904 after striking two mines

General characteristics
- Class & type: Fuji-class pre-dreadnought battleship
- Displacement: 12,230 long tons (12,430 t) (normal)
- Length: 412 ft (125.6 m) (o/a)
- Beam: 73 ft 6 in (22.4 m)
- Draught: 26 ft 3 in (8 m) (deep load)
- Installed power: 13,500 ihp (10,100 kW); 10 cylindrical boilers
- Propulsion: 2 shafts, 2 triple-expansion steam engines
- Speed: 18.25 knots (34 km/h; 21 mph)
- Range: 4,000 nmi (7,400 km; 4,600 mi) at 10 knots (19 km/h; 12 mph)
- Complement: 650
- Armament: 2 × twin 12 in (305 mm) guns; 10 × single 6 in (152 mm) guns; 14 × single 3-pdr (47 mm (1.9 in)) guns; 10 × single 2.5-pdr (47 mm (1.9 in)) guns; 5 × 18 in (450 mm) torpedo tubes
- Armour: Harvey armour; Belt: 14–18 in (356–457 mm); Deck: 2.5 in (64 mm); Gun turrets: 6 in (152 mm)

Yashima (八島, Yashima) was a Fuji-class pre-dreadnought battleship built for the Imperial Japanese Navy (IJN) in the 1890s. As Japan lacked the industrial capacity to construct such vessels, the ship was designed and built in the United Kingdom. She participated in the early stages of the Russo-Japanese War of 1904–1905, including the Battle of Port Arthur on the second day of the war. Yashima was involved in subsequent operations until she struck two mines off Port Arthur in May 1904. The ship did not sink immediately, but capsized while under tow later that day. The Japanese were able to keep her loss a secret from the Russians for over a year.

== Background and description ==
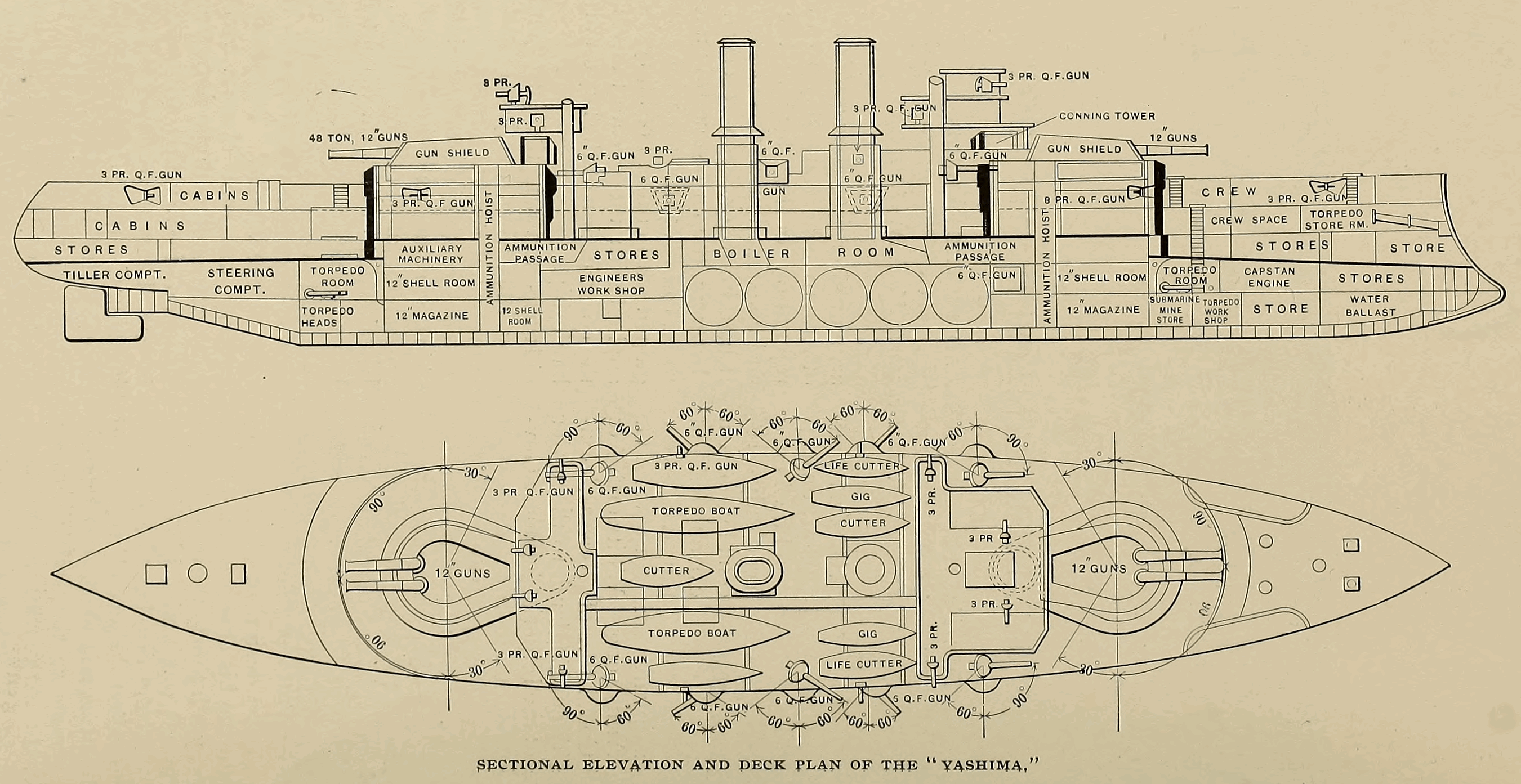
Right elevation and plan showing the internal layout of the ship

The two Fuji-class ships were the IJN's first battleships, ordered from Britain in response to two new German-built Chinese ironclad warships. At this time, Japan lacked the technology and capability to construct its own battleships and they had to be built abroad. The ships were designed by Philip Watts as smaller versions of the British Royal Sovereign class, although they were slightly faster and had a better type of armour. The ships were 412 feet (125.6 m) long overall and had a beam of 73 feet 6 inches (22.4 m) and a draught of 26 feet 3 inches (8 m) at deep load. They normally displaced 12,230 long tons (12,430 t) and had a crew of 650 officers and ratings. Unlike her sister ship Fuji, Yashima was fitted as an admiral's flagship. The ship was powered by two vertical triple-expansion steam engines, each driving one shaft, using steam generated by ten cylindrical boilers. The engines were rated at 13,500 indicated horsepower (10,100 kW) using forced draught and were designed to reach a top speed of 18.25 knots (34 km/h; 21 mph), though Yashima reached a top speed of 19.5 knots (36.1 km/h; 22.4 mph) from 14,075 ihp (10,496 kW) on her sea trials. The sisters carried enough coal to allow them to steam for 4,000 nautical miles (7,400 km; 4,600 mi) at a speed of 10 knots (19 km/h; 12 mph). (Note: Lengerer gives a coal storage figure of 1,110 long tons (1,130 t) that gave them a range of 7,000 nmi (13,000 km; 8,100 mi) at 10 knots.)

The main battery of the Fuji-class ships consisted of four 12-inch (305 mm) guns mounted in two twin-gun turrets, one each fore and aft of the superstructure. Their secondary armament consisted of ten quick-firing (QF) 6-inch (152 mm) guns, four mounted in casemates on the sides of the hull and six mounted on the upper deck, protected by gun shields. Smaller guns were carried for defence against torpedo boats. These included fourteen QF 3-pounder (1.9 in (47 mm)) guns and ten 2.5-pounder Hotchkiss guns of the same calibre, all of which were in single mounts. (Note: Sources differ significantly on the exact outfit of light guns. Naval historians Roger Chesneau and Eugene Kolesnik and Hans Lengerer cite twenty 3- and four 2.5-pounders. Jentschura, Jung & Mickel give a total of twenty-four 47 mm guns, without dividing them between the 3 and 2.5-pounders, while Silverstone says that they had only twenty 47 mm guns, again without discriminating between the two types.) The ships were also armed with five 18-inch (450 mm) torpedo tubes, one above water in the bow and a submerged pair on each broadside. The Fuji class had a waterline armour belt that consisted of Harvey armour 14–18 inches (356–457 mm) thick. Their gun turrets were protected by 6-inch armour plates and their decks were 2.5 inches (64 mm) thick. In 1901, the ships exchanged 16 of their 47 mm guns for an equal number of QF 12-pounder (3 in (76 mm)) 12 cwt guns. (Note: "Cwt" is the abbreviation for hundredweight, 12 cwt referring to the weight of the gun.) This raised the number of crewmen to 652 and later to 741.

== Construction and career ==
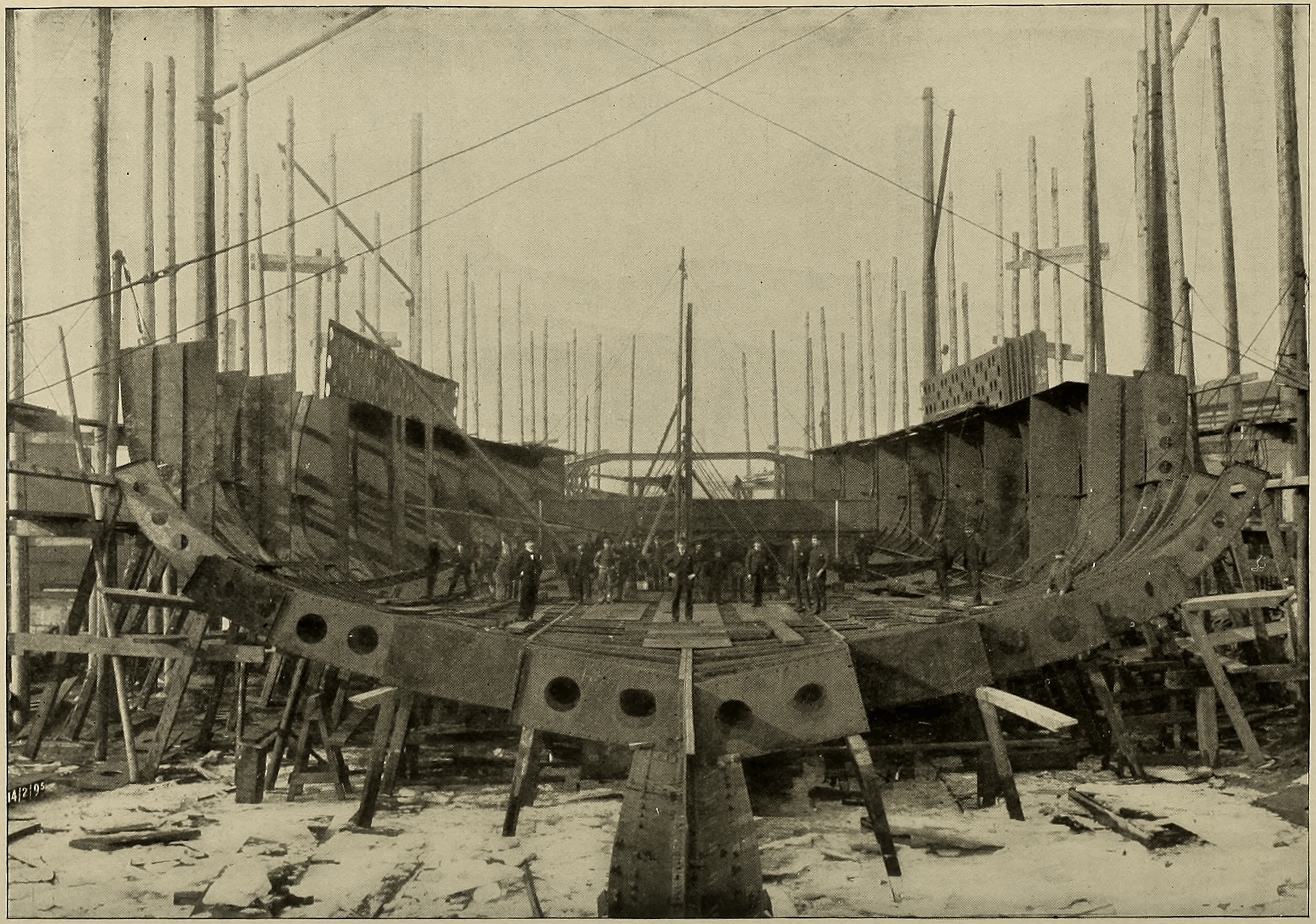
Yashima under construction, about two months after her keel was laid down

Given a classical name for Japan, Yashima was ordered as part of the 1894 Naval Programme and the ship was laid down by Armstrong Whitworth at their Elswick shipyard on 6 December 1894 as yard number 625. The ship was launched on 28 February 1896 and completed on 9 September 1897, at a total cost of ¥10,500,000. She conducted her sea trials during the following month. Yashima departed the UK on 15 September and arrived at Yokosuka, Japan, on 30 November. She was initially assigned to the Standing Fleet, the IJN's primary combat fleet, but was reduced to reserve on 20 November. The ship was reclassified as a first-class battleship on 21 March 1898 and reassigned to the Standing Fleet. Two years later, Yashima was again placed in reserve where she remained until reactivated on 28 December 1903 and assigned to the 1st Division of the 1st Fleet of the Combined Fleet.

At the start of the Russo-Japanese War, Yashima, commanded by Captain Hajime Sakamoto, participated in the Battle of Port Arthur on 9 February 1904 when Vice-Admiral Tōgō Heihachirō led his battleships and cruisers in an attack on the Russian ships of the Pacific Squadron anchored just outside Port Arthur. Tōgō had expected the preceding surprise night attack by his destroyers to be much more successful than it was, anticipating that the Russians would be badly disorganised and weakened, but they had recovered from their surprise and were ready for the attack of the battleships and cruisers. The Japanese ships were spotted by the protected cruiser Boyarin, which was patrolling offshore and alerted the Russian defences. Tōgō chose to attack the Russian coastal defences with his main armament and engage the ships with his secondary guns. Splitting his fire proved to be a poor decision as the Japanese eight-inch (203 mm) and six-inch guns inflicted little damage on the Russian ships, which concentrated all their fire on the Japanese ships with some effect. Although many ships on both sides were hit, Russian casualties numbered only 17, while the Japanese suffered 60 killed and wounded before Tōgō disengaged. Yashima was not hit during the battle.

On 10 March, Yashima and her sister Fuji, under the command of Rear-Admiral Nashiba Tokioki, blindly bombarded the harbour of Port Arthur from Pigeon Bay, on the south west side of the Liaodong Peninsula, at a range of 5.9 miles (9.5 km). They fired 154 twelve-inch shells, but did little damage. When they tried again on 22 March, they were attacked by newly emplaced coast-defence guns that had been transferred there by the new Russian commander, Vice-Admiral Stepan Makarov, and also from several Russian ships in Port Arthur using observers overlooking Pigeon Bay. The Japanese ships disengaged after Fuji was hit by a twelve-inch shell.

Yashima participated in the action of 13 April when Tōgō successfully lured out a portion of the Pacific Squadron, including Makarov's flagship, the battleship Petropavlovsk. When Makarov spotted the five battleships of the 1st Division, he turned back for Port Arthur and Petropavlovsk struck a mine laid by the Japanese the previous night. The Russian battleship sank in less than two minutes after one of her magazines exploded and Makarov was one of the 677 killed. Emboldened by his success, Tōgō resumed long-range bombardment missions, which prompted the Russians to lay more minefields.

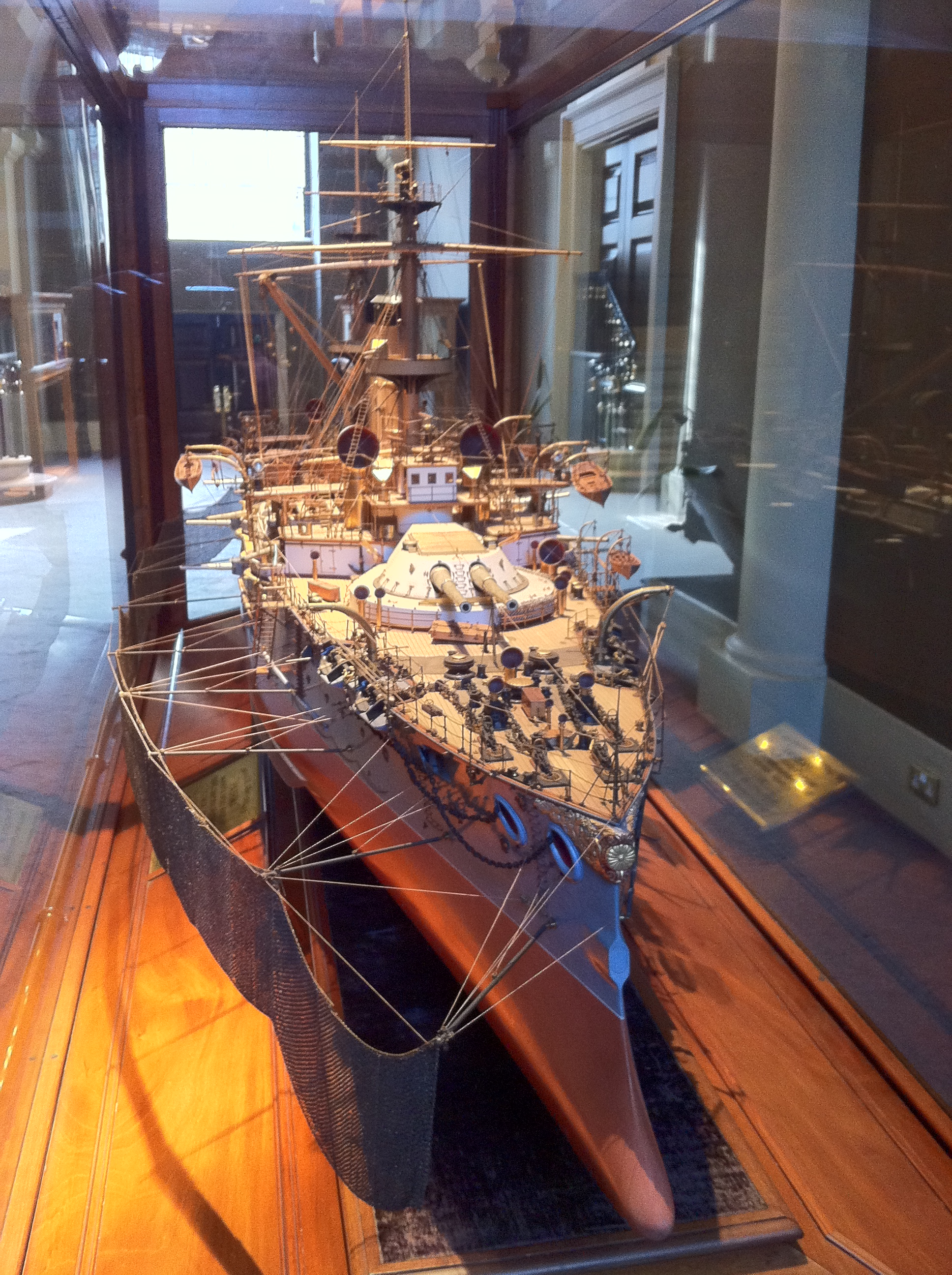
A model of Yashima in the British National Maritime Museum

On 14 May, Nashiba put to sea with his flagship Hatsuse and two other battleships, Shikishima, and Yashima, the protected cruiser Kasagi, and the dispatch boat Tatsuta to relieve the Japanese blockading force off Port Arthur. On the following morning, the squadron encountered a minefield laid by the Russian minelayer Amur. Hatsuse struck one mine that disabled her steering around 11:10 and Yashima struck two others when moving to assist Hatsuse. One blew a hole in her starboard aft boiler room and the other detonated on the starboard forward side of her hull, near the underwater torpedo room. After the second detonation the ship had a 9° list to starboard that gradually increased throughout the day.

Yashima was towed away from the minefield, north towards the Japanese base in the Elliott Islands. She was still taking on water at an uncontrollable rate, and Sakamoto ordered the ship anchored around 17:00 near Encounter Rock to allow the crew to easily abandon ship. He assembled the crew, which sang the Japanese national anthem, "Kimigayo," and then abandoned ship. Kasagi took Yashima in tow, but the battleship's list continued to increase, and she capsized about three hours later, after the cruiser was forced to cast off the tow, roughly at co-ordinates 38°34′N 121°40′E. The Japanese were able to conceal her loss for more than a year as no Russians observed Yashima sink. As part of the deception, the surviving crewmen were assigned to four auxiliary gunboats for the rest of the war that were tasked to guard Port Arthur and addressed their letters as if they were still aboard the battleship.
