= Hayward A. Harvey =

American inventor and industrialist (1824–1893)

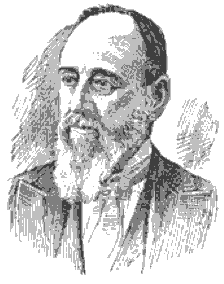
- Born: Hayward Augustus Harvey; January 17, 1824; Jamestown, New York
- Died: August 28, 1893 (aged 69); Orange, New Jersey
- Occupations: Inventor, industrialist
- Spouses: Matilda Winant; Emily A. Halsey
- Children: 2

Hayward Augustus Harvey (January 17, 1824 – August 28, 1893) was an American inventor and industrialist.

== Biography ==
Hayward A. Harvey was born in Jamestown, New York, on January 17, 1824. He was educated at the Poughkeepsie Academy and the Academy of New Paltz.

He was married twice, to Matilda Winant and Emily A. Halsey. He had one son by each marriage.

He is best known for inventing the Harvey process for case hardening the front surface of steel armor plate. The resulting Harvey armor was widely used on armoured ships in the 1890s. He invented the process while living in Orange, New Jersey, and died there on August 28, 1893.

== Patents ==
- U.S. patent 506,689, Manufacture of Steel Rails for Railroads
- U.S. patent 498,390, Improvement in Compositions for Super-carburizing Steel
- U.S. patent 460,262, Improvements in Decrementally-Hardened Armor-Plates
- U.S. patent 460,261, Gun
- U.S. patent 329,738, Spring-washer
