= Humphrys, Tennant and Dykes =

- Industry: Engineering
- Founded: 1852
- Defunct: 1907
- Headquarters: Deptford, London
- Key people: Edward Humphrys
- Products: Marine steam engines

Humphrys, Tennant and Dykes (later named Humphrys, Tennant and Co.) was a British engineering company based in Deptford, London, England.

== History ==
The company was founded in 1852 by Edward Humphrys, formerly chief engineer of Woolwich Dockyard, where Dykes was also employed in the steam factory. In 1882 the name was changed to Humphrys, Tennant and Co. of Deptford Pier, London. It specialised in building large marine steam engines and boilers, including those for the Navy's fast cruisers and iron-clad battleships. The 50 years of production started in the early days of screw-propellers (as opposed to paddle wheels) and spanned great changes in the available pressure from boilers and the resulting power of the engines, as well as in the construction and form of ships. Their main competitors were Maudslay, Sons and Field and John Penn and Sons. The works at Deptford Pier was closed in 1907.

== Early installations ==
One of the early records of a Humphrys, Tennant and Dykes steam engine was the conversion of the Russian ship of the line Konstantin to steam power between 1852 and 1854. The engine was rated at 450 nominal horsepower, and drove a single screw propeller. This early engine must have performed well, for when the Konstantin was retired in 1864 the engine was refurbished and installed in the Russian ironclad Ne Tron Menia, and its from the sea trials of this vessel in 1865 that we know the engine produced 1200 indicated horsepower (ihp). Fitted with new boilers in 1877, the sea trials showed the power improved to 1700 ihp.

The layout and type of the Konstantin engine was probably similar to the pair of direct-acting engines displayed at the 1862 International Exhibition, reputedly intended for HMS North Star. These were twin-cylinder non-compound horizontal engines with 64 inch cylinders and just 32 inches of stroke, allowing relatively short connecting rods. The crankshaft, of 13.5 inches diameter, was supported in 3 main bearings, each 25 inches long, on a single cast bedplate. Condenser air pumps were provided on the opposite side from the cylinders. Although rated as 400 nominal horsepower, with 24 psi steam (reflecting the very low marine boiler pressures typical at that time) the engine had shown 1834 ihp.

Another early installation was in HMS Beagle (1854) (and possibly the other five Arrow-class gunvessels). The Beagle had a single screw propeller driven by a horizontal twin-cylinder expansion engine rated at 160 nhp.

== Woolf expansion engines exhibited in 1862 ==
At the 1862 International Exhibition Humphrys, Tennant and Dykes showed details of the 4-cylinder expansion engines for the Peninsular & Oriental Steam Navigation Company's ship Mooltan. The cylinders were steam jacketed and arranged in pairs using the Woolf compound system, with each of the smaller 43-inch (109 cm) diameter cylinders being above the corresponding 96-inch (244 cm) diameter one. The four cylinders drove a single screw propeller 16 feet (4.9 m) in diameter. The same type of engine was also fitted to the Peninsular & Oriental Steam Navigation ship SS Carnatic, on which it had recorded 2442 indicated horsepower. Even though these engines were operated at a relatively low 20–25 psi (140–170 kPa) steam pressure, the compound system was claimed to give significant benefits in economy.

== Horizontal twin-cylinder compound steam engines ==
This form of engine was supplied to the Navy's Fantome-class sloops (with the exception of HMS Daring) during 1873–1874. A single engine drove an 11-foot screw propeller and provided about 1000 indicated horsepower with a steam pressure of 60 psi.

== Three-cylinder single-expansion engines ==
In the late 1870s an extra cylinder was added for the Cornus-class corvettes HMS Curacoa (1878), HMS Cleopatra (1878) and HMS Conquest (1878), in which a high-pressure cylinder of 46 inches was flanked by two low-pressure cylinders of 64 inches. The engines produced about 2500 indicated horsepower.

== Triple-expansion vertical steam engines ==
Triple-expansion engines operating at up to 60 psi were fitted to HMS Dreadnought (1875), the high-pressure cylinders were 60-inch diameter and the low-pressure 90-inch diameter.

Triple-expansion engines were also fitted to the battleship HMS Victoria (1887), with cylinders of 43, 62 and 96 inches producing 12,000 ihp.

Higher-pressure engines were fitted to the ironclads HMS Renown (1895), HMS Sans Pareil (1887), and HMS Trafalgar (1887). Each ship had two engines, with each driving a 16.5-foot-diameter propeller. Each engine was rated at 6000 indicated horsepower at 95 rpm. Humphrys, Tennant and Co. also designed the boilers, each ship having a total of 8 boilers of 15-foot diameter with optional forced draft providing steam at 135 psi.

HMS Blenheim (1890) was fitted with four triple-expansion engines giving her 20,000 indicated horsepower and a top speed of 22 knots. The forward engines could be disconnected to increase her range.

Power plants were also provided for vessels built for the overseas market, such as the Shikishima which was completed in 1899, with its sea trials indicating 15,000 horsepower from her twin triple-expansion engines. Other Fuji-class battleships also used engines and boilers supplied by Humphrys Tenant & Co. Triple-expansion engines of 11,200 i.h.p. were also provided to the Russian battleship Poltava (1894) and her sister ship the Petropavlovsk (1894).

== Horizontal triple-expansion steam engines for fast twin-screw cruisers ==
These horizontal triple-expansion steam engines were in pairs, with each pair rated at 6000 indicated horsepower. The details of these engines reported by D. K. Clark do not reveal to which ships they were fitted.

== Four-cylinder triple-expansion engines ==
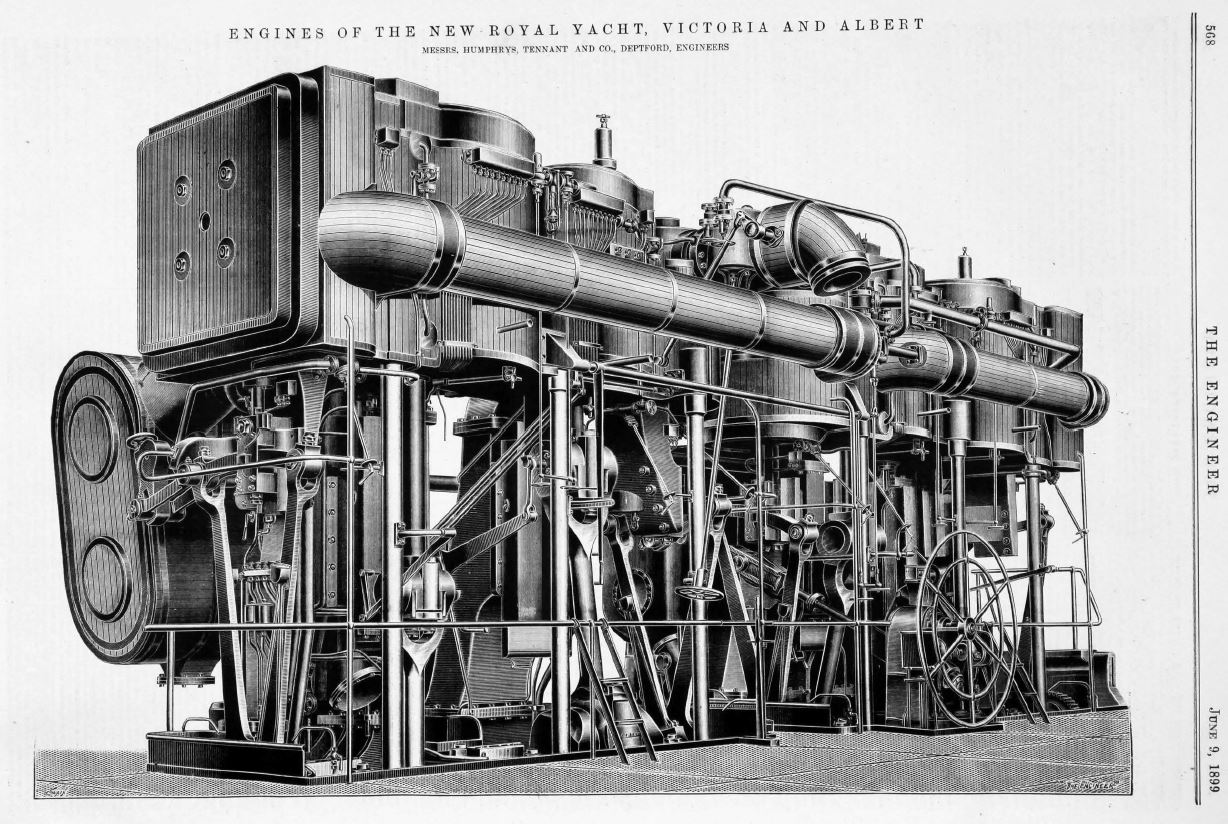

A prestigious contract for Humphrys, Tennant and Co. was the power plant for the 1899 Royal Yacht Victoria and Albert (see image). The two engines were capable of 7500 indicated horsepower continuously, and 11,000 indicated horsepower for short periods at a maximum of 140 rpm. The engines had high- and intermediate-pressure cylinders located between double low-pressure cylinders. The cylinder diameters were 26.5 in, 44.5 in and 2x53 in, all with a 39 in stroke. There was both steam and hand reversing gear operating via Stephenson link motion. The high- and intermediate-pressure cylinders used piston valves, whereas the low-pressure cylinders used slide valves. Each engine had twin condensers arranged so that either could be taken out of service for repair without stopping the engines, and each engine had two air pumps driven off the low-pressure connecting rods. Eighteen Belleville boilers provided steam at up to 300 psi, though this was dropped to 250 psi at the engines by reducing valves.

This engine layout with triple expansion via four cylinders was clearly successful and was fitted into a range of ships, including the four Drake-class cruisers of 1901, which with 43 Belleville boilers produced 30,000 ihp and 23 knots. Four-cylinder triple-expansion engines were also fitted in HMS Carnarvon, built on the Clyde. In her trials in early 1905, she achieved a full-power run of 8 hours duration at 23.3 knots, a full knot above her design speed.
