= Harvey armor =

Type of casehardened naval armor

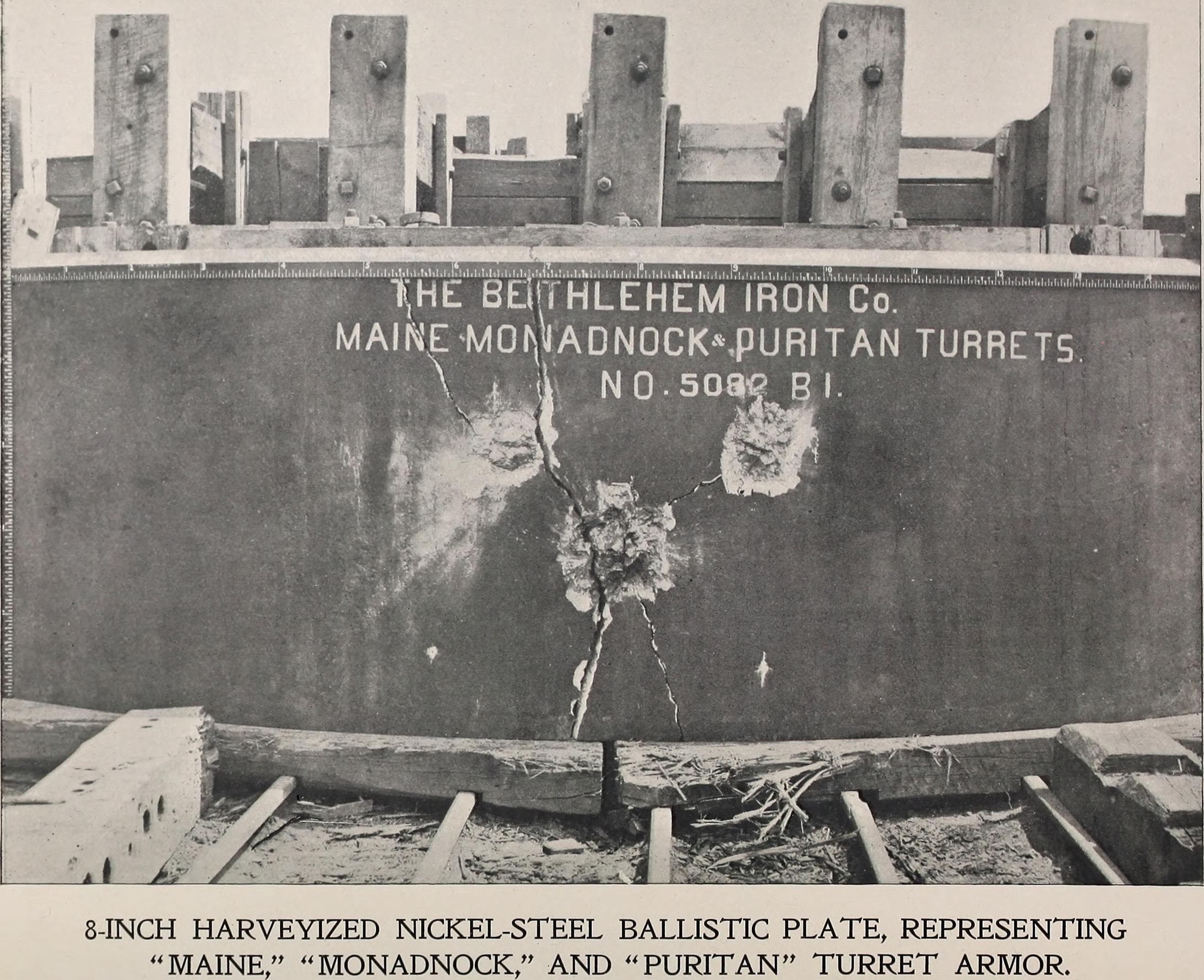
8 inches (200 mm) Harveyized nickel-steel plate from 1894

Harvey armor was a type of steel naval armor developed in the early 1890s in which the front surfaces of the plates were case hardened. The method for doing this was known as the Harvey process, and was invented by the American engineer Hayward Augustus Harvey.

This type of armor was used in the construction of capital ships until superseded by Krupp armor in the late 1890s.

The Harvey United Steel Company was a steel cartel whose chairman was Albert Vickers. The year 1894 would see the ten main producers of armor plate, including Vickers, Armstrong, Krupp, Schneider, Carnegie, and Bethlehem Steel, form the Harvey Syndicate.

== Predecessors ==
Before the appearance of compound armor in the 1880s, armor plating was made from uniform homogeneous iron or steel plates backed by several inches of teak to absorb the shock of projectile impact. Compound armor appeared in the mid-1880s and was made from two different types of metal, a very hard but brittle high-carbon steel front plate backed by a more elastic low-carbon wrought iron plate. The front plate was intended to break up an incoming shell, while the rear plate would catch any splinters and hold the armor together if the brittle front plate shattered.

Compound armor was made by pouring molten steel between a red-hot wrought iron backing plate and a hardened steel front plate to weld them together. This process produced a sharp transition between the properties of the two plates in a very small distance. As consequence, the two plates could separate when struck by a shell, and the rear plate was often not elastic enough to stop the splinters. With the discovery of nickel-steel alloys in 1889, compound armor was rendered obsolete.

== Production process ==
Harvey armor used a single plate of steel, but re-introduced the benefits of compound armor. The front surface was converted to high-carbon steel by "cementing". In this process, the steel plate would be covered with charcoal and heated to approximately 1200 degrees Celsius for two to three weeks. The process increased the carbon content at the face to around 1 percent; the carbon content decreasing gradually from this level with distance into the plate, reaching the original proportion (approximately 0.1–0.2 percent) at a depth of around an inch. After cementing, the plate was chilled first in an oil bath, then in a water bath, before being annealed to toughen the back of the plate. The water bath was later replaced with jets of water to prevent the formation of a layer of steam which would insulate the steel from the cooling effect of the water. The process was further improved by low temperature forging of the plate before the final heat treatment.

While the American navy used nickel steel for Harvey armor (roughly 0.2 percent carbon, 0.6 percent manganese, 3.5 percent nickel), the British used normal steels since their tests had shown that ordinary steel subjected to the Harvey process had the same resistance to penetration as nickel steel, although it was not quite as tough.

Harvey armor was taken up by all of the major navies, since 13 in (330 mm) of Harvey armor offered the same protection as 15.5 in (390 mm) of nickel-steel armor. It was in turn rendered obsolete by the development of Krupp armor in the late 1890s.

== See also ==
- Carburizing
