= Petropavlovsk-class battleship =

Class of Russian pre-dreadnoughts

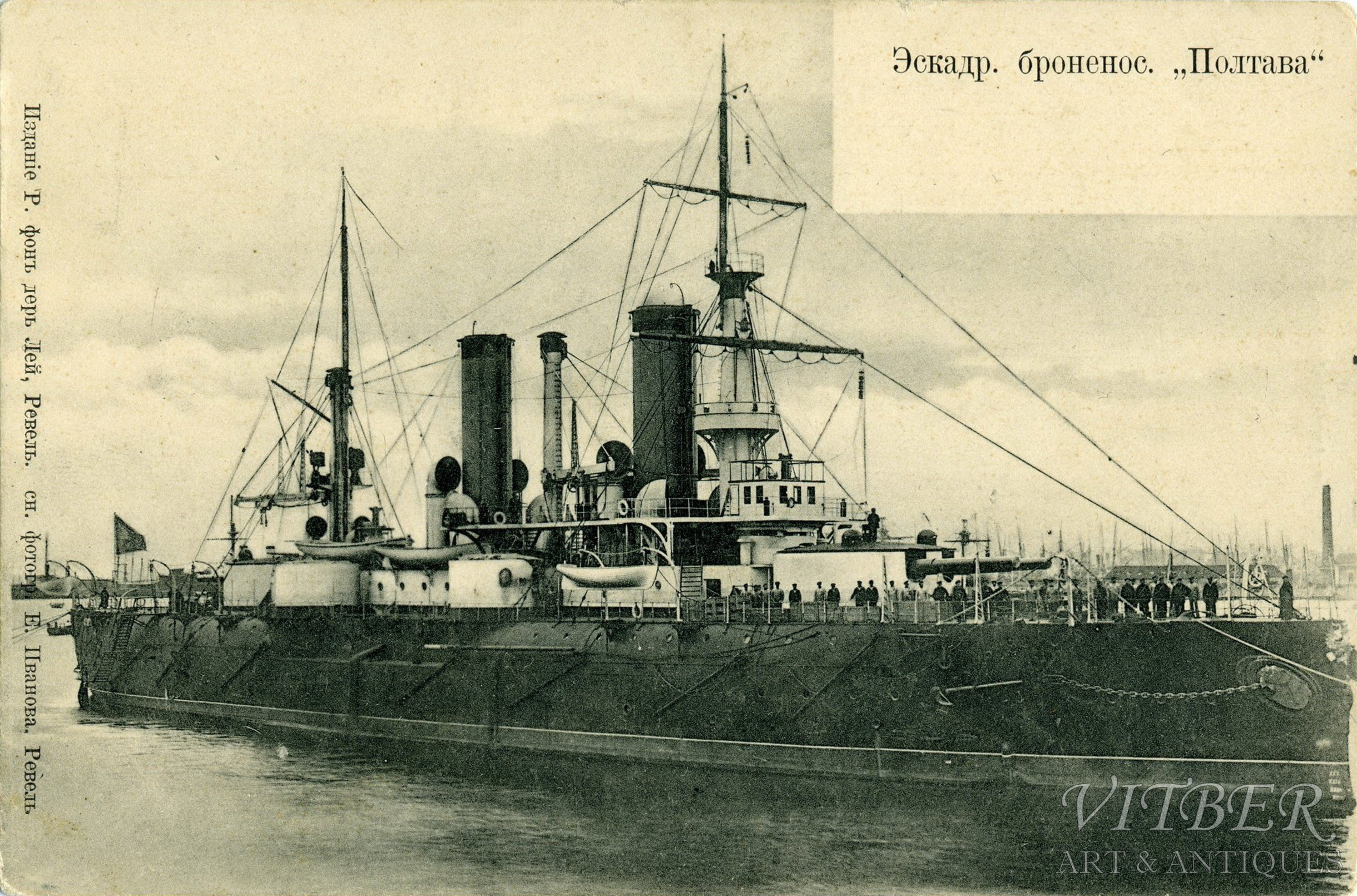
- A postcard of Poltava

Class overview
- Builders: Galernyi Island Shipyard (2); New Admiralty Yard (1)
- Operators: Imperial Russian Navy; Imperial Japanese Navy
- Preceded by: Sissoi Veliky
- Succeeded by: Rostislav
- Built: 1892–1898
- In commission: 1897–1923
- Completed: 3
- Lost: 2
- Scrapped: 1

General characteristics
- Type: Pre-dreadnought battleship
- Displacement: 11,354–11,842 long tons (11,536–12,032 t)
- Length: 376 ft (114.6 m)
- Beam: 70 ft (21.3 m)
- Draught: 28 ft 3 in (8.6 m)
- Installed power: 10,600 ihp (7,904 kW); 14 or 16 cylindrical boilers
- Propulsion: 2 shafts, 2 triple-expansion steam engines
- Speed: 16 knots (30 km/h; 18 mph)
- Range: 3,750 nmi (6,940 km; 4,320 mi)
- Complement: 631–652, 750 as flagship
- Armament: 2 × twin 12 in (305 mm) guns; 4 × twin, 4 × single 6 in (152 mm) guns; 10 or 12 × single 47 mm (1.9 in) guns; 28 × single 37 mm (1.5 in) guns; 4 × 15-inch (381 mm) torpedo tubes; 2 × 18-inch (457 mm) torpedo tubes
- Armor: Waterline belt: 10–16 in (254–406 mm); Gun turrets: 10 in (254 mm); Secondary turrets: 5 in (127 mm); Conning tower: 9 in (229 mm); Deck: 2–3 in (51–76 mm)

The Petropavlovsk class, sometimes referred to as the Poltava class, was a group of three pre-dreadnought battleships built for the Imperial Russian Navy during the 1890s. They were transferred to the Pacific Squadron shortly after their completion in 1899–1900 and were based at Port Arthur before the start of the Russo-Japanese War of 1904–1905. All three ships participated in the Battle of Port Arthur on the second day of the war. Petropavlovsk sank two months after the war began after striking one or more mines laid by the Japanese. Her two sister ships, Sevastopol and Poltava, took part in the Battle of the Yellow Sea in August 1904 and were sunk or scuttled during the final stages of the siege of Port Arthur in early 1905.

Poltava was salvaged after the Japanese captured Port Arthur and incorporated into the Imperial Japanese Navy. The ship, renamed Tango in Japanese service, participated in the Battle of Tsingtao in late 1914, during World War I. She was sold back to the Russians in 1916 and renamed Chesma as her original name was in use by another battleship. The ship became the flagship of the Russian Arctic Flotilla in 1917, and her crew supported the Bolsheviks later that year. Chesma was seized by the British in early 1918 when they intervened in the Russian Civil War, abandoned by them when they withdrew and scrapped by the Soviets in 1924.

== Background and description ==
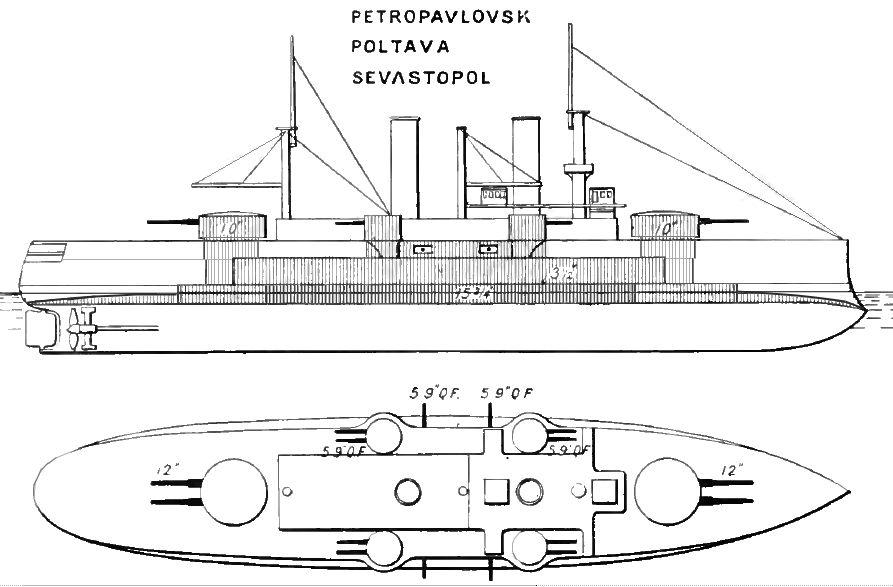
Corrected right elevation and deck plan as depicted in Brassey's The Naval Annual 1902

Tsar Alexander III's ambitious building programme of 1882 called for construction of 16 battleships in 20 years for the Baltic Fleet. By 1890 the program was behind schedule and the director of the Naval Ministry, Vice Admiral Nikolay Chikhachyov, proposed that six first-class and four second-class battleships be built together with some armored coast-defense ships to make up the numbers required. The Petropavlovsk-class ships were designed as first-class battleships to meet his requirement for a heavily armored ship that displaced 10,500 long tons (10,700 t) and had a speed of 17 knots (31 km/h; 20 mph), a maximum draught of 26 feet (7.9 m) and a range of 3,750 nautical miles (6,940 km; 4,320 mi) with good seakeeping qualities.

The design began as an enlarged and improved version of the battleship Imperator Nikolai I, but with her main armament of four 12-inch (305 mm) guns mounted in lighter barbettes rather than the heavy gun turrets of the older ship. Based on experience with Imperator Aleksandr II, in which the casemate-mounted secondary armament could often not be worked in rough weather, the Naval Technical Committee (NTC) adopted the layout of the American Indiana-class battleships with the secondary armament mounted in turrets on the upper deck. Use of the lighter barbette mounting allowed for a flush-deck hull, which gave the design high freeboard. It was approved in January 1891 by the NTC with a displacement of 10,960 long tons (11,136 t) and a full-length waterline armor belt.

The design was intended to have a maximum speed of 17 knots using forced draft, but model testing of the hull showed that it could only reach 16 knots (30 km/h; 18 mph). Rather than delay construction by redesigning the hull, the navy accepted the slower speed. Development of the quick-firing (QF) gun meant that an upper belt of armor was necessary and the weight required was gained by shortening the waterline armor belt, which left the ships' ends protected only by the sloping armor deck. Other changes included the replacement of the barbettes with turrets of the same type as used in the battleship Sissoi Veliky and the substitution of QF six-inch (152 mm) guns for the original eight-inch (203 mm) guns. This last change saved enough weight to permit four more six-inch guns to be added.

The Petropavlovsk-class ships were 376 feet (114.6 m) long overall, had a beam of 70 feet (21 m) and a draught of 28 feet 3 inches (8.6 m). Designed to displace 10,960 long tons (11,140 t), they were 400–900 long tons (410–910 t) overweight and actually displaced 11,354–11,842 long tons (11,536–12,032 t). The ships were the first flush-decked battleships built for the navy. They had a partial double bottom, and the hull was divided by 10 watertight transverse bulkheads; a centerline bulkhead divided the machinery spaces. The upper part of the hull between the main and upper decks curved inwards (tumblehome). The Petropavlovsks had a designed metacentric height of 5.43 feet (1.7 m) and were good seagoing ships. Their crew consisted of 26–27 officers and 605–625 enlisted men; Petropavlovsk had a crew of 750 when serving as a flagship.

The ships were powered by two vertical triple-expansion steam engines, each driving one propeller, using steam generated by 14 cylindrical boilers at a working pressure of 8.8 atm (892 kPa; 129 psi). Unlike her sisters, Sevastopol had 16 boilers. The engines were rated at 10,600 indicated horsepower (7,904 kW) and designed to reach a top speed of 16 knots. Poltava and Petropavlovsk used engines and boilers imported from Britain and slightly exceeded their specifications; during their sea trials, the ships reached maximum speeds of 16.29 and 16.38 knots (30.17 and 30.34 km/h; 18.75 and 18.85 mph) from 11,213 and 11,255 ihp (8,362 and 8,393 kW), respectively. Sevastopol, using domestically built machinery, only reached a speed of 15.3 knots (28.3 km/h; 17.6 mph) from 9,368 indicated horsepower (6,986 kW), despite the extra boilers. The Naval Ministry chose not to exercise the penalty provisions of the contract for failing to attain the design speed because it had specified the machinery to be used. The Petropavlovsks carried a maximum of 1,050 long tons (1,070 t) of coal which allowed them to steam for 3,750 nautical miles (6,940 km; 4,320 mi) at a speed of 10 knots (19 km/h; 12 mph).

=== Armament ===
The main armament of the Petropavlovsk class consisted of four 40-caliber 12-inch guns mounted in twin-gun turrets fore and aft of the superstructure. They used hydraulic power for loading and traversing, but the ammunition hoists were electrically powered. Designed to fire one shell every 90 seconds, the rate of fire of the guns in service proved to be one round every three minutes. The structure of the turrets proved to be too weak to withstand extra-strength charges and had to be reinforced. The guns could elevate to a maximum of +15° and traverse 270°; each was provided with 58 rounds. They fired a 731-pound (331.7 kg) shell at a muzzle velocity of 2,600 ft/s (792 m/s). This gave them a range of 12,010 yards (10,980 m) at an elevation of 10°.

The secondary armament of the ships consisted of a dozen 45-caliber QF Canet Model 1892 six-inch guns. Eight of these were mounted in four twin-gun turrets on the upper deck and the remaining four guns were on pedestal mounts in unarmored embrasures in the sides of the hull, one deck below and between the turrets. Electric motors traversed the turrets and worked the ammunition hoists, but the guns were elevated manually. They had a 135° arc of fire, and the guns could elevate to a maximum of +15° and depress to −5°. The rate of fire of the turret-mounted guns was generally only about half that (two to three rounds per minute) of the pedestal-mounted guns. The motors and mechanism of the ammunition hoists were troublesome and sometimes reduced the rate of fire down to one round per minute. The guns in the hull could traverse 100° and each six-inch gun was provided with 200 rounds. Their muzzle velocity of 2,600 ft/s (792.5 m/s) gave their 91.4-pound (41.46 kg) shells a maximum range of 12,602 yards (11,523 m).

Smaller guns were carried for defense against torpedo boats. These included a dozen (Note: Sevastopol carried only ten 47-millimeter guns.) quick-firing (QF) 47-millimeter (1.9 in) Hotchkiss guns in hull embrasures and on the superstructure. They fired a 3-pound-3-ounce (1.4 kg) shell at a muzzle velocity of 1,867 ft/s (569 m/s). Twenty-eight smaller Maxim QF 37-millimeter (1.5 in) guns were positioned in hull embrasures, on the superstructure and in the fighting tops. They fired a 1-pound (0.45 kg) shell at a muzzle velocity of 1,319 ft/s (402 m/s).

The Petropavlovsk-class ships carried four 15-inch (381 mm) torpedo tubes, all above water, mounted on the broadside and two broadside 18-inch (457 mm) underwater tubes. The forward 15-inch tubes were near the forward main gun turret and were unprotected by any armor; aft, the 15-inch tubes were protected by the upper armor belt. The underwater tubes were protected underneath the armor deck, forward of the forward 12-inch magazine. Each ship also carried 50 mines to be laid to protect its anchorage in remote areas.

The ships were fitted with Liuzhol stadiametric rangefinders that used the angle between two vertical points on an enemy ship, usually the waterline and the crow's nest, to estimate the range. The gunnery officer consulted his references to get the range and calculated the proper elevation and deflection required to hit the target. He transmitted his commands via a Geisler electro-mechanical fire-control transmission system to each gun or turret.

=== Protection ===
The Russian armor-plate industry had not yet mastered the process for forming thick steel plates so the armor for these ships was ordered from companies in Germany and the United States. Even they could not produce enough of the latest types of armor plate in the quantities required for all three ships. Petropavlovsk had ordinary nickel steel, while Sevastopol used Harvey armor and Poltava was fitted with the latest Krupp armor. The thicknesses of the armor plates varied in an attempt to equalize their effectiveness. In Petropavlovsk, the maximum thickness of the waterline armor belt over the machinery spaces was 16 inches (406 mm), which reduced to 12 inches abreast the magazines and tapered to a thickness of 8 inches at its bottom edge. In the other two ships, it was 14.5 inches (368 mm) thick over the machinery spaces, 10 inches (254 mm) over the magazines and 7.25 inches (184 mm) at its lower edge. The belt covered 240 feet (73.2 m) of the ships' length and was 7 feet 6 inches (2.3 m) high, of which the upper 3 feet (0.9 m) was intended to be above the waterline. It terminated in transverse bulkheads 9 inches (229 mm) thick fore and aft, leaving the ends of the ships unprotected. Above the waterline belt was an upper strake of 5-inch (127 mm) armor that ran between the turret bases, seven and a half feet high. The ends of the upper belt were closed off by five-inch angled transverse bulkheads that connected the ends of the upper belt to the turret support tubes.

The armor of the main-gun turrets and their supporting tubes was 10 inches thick (Krupp armor in Poltava, nickel steel in the other two) with roofs 2 inches (51 mm) thick. The turrets of the secondary armament had 5-inch sides with 1 inch (25 mm) roofs. The six-inch guns in the hull embrasures were unprotected. The sides of the conning tower were 9 inches thick while the armor deck in the central citadel was 2 inches thick. Outside the area covered by the belt armor, the flat portion of the deck was 2.5 inches (64 mm) thick, while the sloped portion was 3 inches (76 mm) thick.

== Ships ==
Construction data
Ship	Namesake	Builder	Laid down	Launched	Entered service	Fate
Petropavlovsk (Петропавловск)	Battle of Petropavlovsk	Galernyi Island Shipyard, Saint Petersburg	19 May 1892 (Note: All dates used in this article are New Style.)	9 November 1894	1899	Sank after striking a mine, 13 April 1904
Poltava (Полтава)	Battle of Poltava	New Admiralty Shipyard, Saint Petersburg	19 May 1892	6 November 1894	1899	Scrapped, 1924
Sevastopol (Севастополь)	Siege of Sevastopol	Galernyi Island Shipyard, Saint Petersburg	19 May 1892	1 June 1895	1900	Scuttled, 2 January 1905

== Service ==
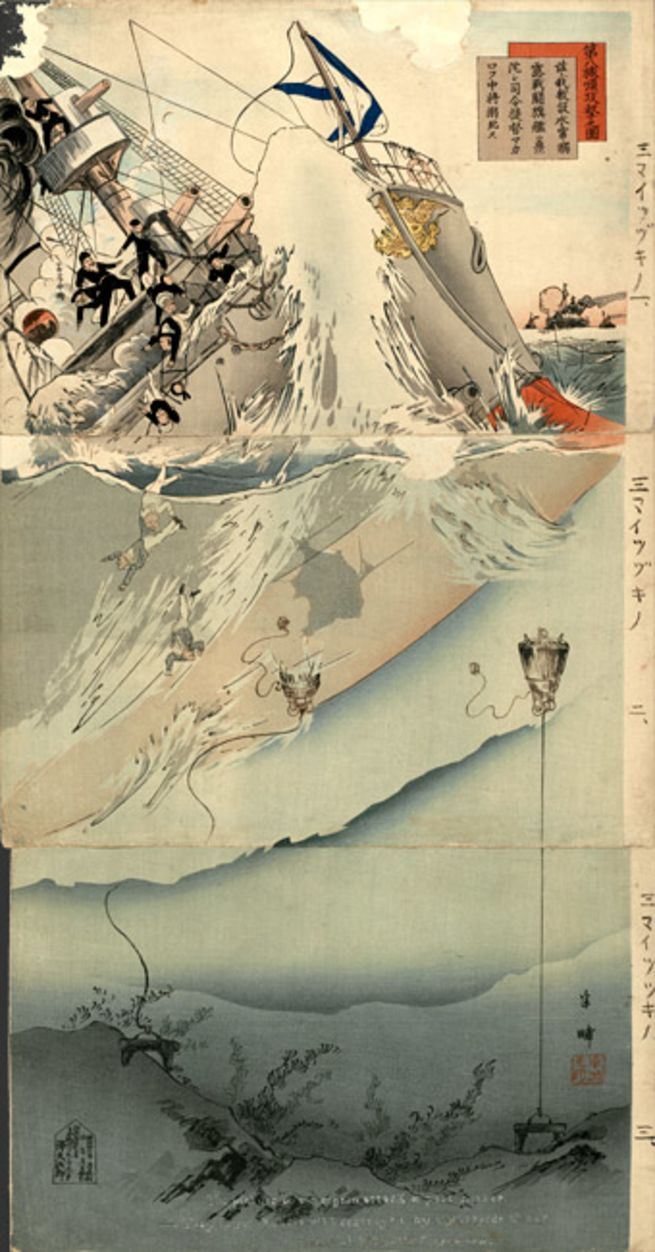
A Japanese depiction of the sinking of Petropavlovsk. The original caption reads: "Picture of the Eighth Attack on Port Arthur. The Flagship of Russia Was Destroyed by the Torpedo of Our Navy and Admiral Makaroff Drowned."

Petropavlovsk was the first of the sisters to enter service; she departed Kronstadt on 17 October 1899 and reached Port Arthur on 10 May 1900. Upon her arrival, she became flagship of the Pacific Squadron commander, Vice Admiral Nikolai Skrydlov. The ship supported international efforts to suppress the Boxer Rebellion in mid-1900. Poltava and Sevastopol departed for Port Arthur on 15 October 1900 and arrived on 12 and 13 April 1901 respectively. Petropavlovsk was the flagship of Vice Admiral Oskar Stark at the beginning of the Russo-Japanese War in February 1904.

During the Battle of Port Arthur on the second day of the war, Poltava was hit twice in the aft hull, Petropavlovsk was hit three times in the bow and Sevastopol was hit once. Between them, the sisters had two men killed and seven wounded and were not significantly damaged. None of them made any hits on Japanese ships. The Naval Ministry relieved Stark, and he was replaced by Vice Admiral Stepan Makarov who assumed command on 7 March. On 13 April, Petropavlovsk and Poltava sortied to support Russian cruisers and destroyers engaging their Japanese counterparts, but they headed back to Port Arthur to join the rest of the Pacific Squadron when the main Japanese battlefleet appeared. They ran into a newly laid minefield en route and Petropavlovsk struck at least one of the mines, sinking in less than two minutes. Casualties included Admiral Makarov and his guest, the war artist Vasily Vereshchagin, 26 other officers and 652 enlisted men. Only 7 officers and 73 crewmen were rescued.

The new commander, Rear Admiral Wilgelm Vitgeft, made an attempt to lead the Pacific Squadron to Vladivostok on 23 June, but abandoned the sortie when the squadron was discovered and pursued by the Japanese. While returning to Port Arthur, Sevastopol struck a mine, and the ship took on an estimated 1,000 long tons (1,000 t) of water; despite the flooding she was able to keep up with the fleet and reached port successfully. While under repair, which lasted until 9 July, a fire broke out aboard the ship, killing 2 crewmen and injuring another 28. All of the 47- and 37-millimeter guns in the lower hull embrasures were removed from Poltava and Sevastopol during this time; some were remounted on the superstructure, but others were used to reinforce the land defenses of Port Arthur.

Vitgeft made another attempt to break through the Japanese blockade on 10 August in obedience to a direct order from Tsar Nicholas II. The squadron was spotted relatively quickly, and the Japanese main fleet intercepted the Russians in the early afternoon. In the resulting Battle of the Yellow Sea, Poltava and Sevastopol were the last battleships in the Russian column and the former, slowed by engine problems, became the primary target of the Japanese battleships and armored cruisers when Vitgeft maneuvered the squadron past the Japanese and forced them into a stern chase. Shortly before sunset, a lucky hit killed Vitgeft and threw the squadron into confusion. The Russian second-in-command, Rear Admiral Prince Pavel Ukhtomsky, eventually gained control of the squadron and led most of the ships back to Port Arthur. Poltava was hit by 12–14 large-caliber shells and lost 12 crewmen killed and 43 wounded; Sevastopol was hit by several shells that killed 1 and wounded 62 crewmen.

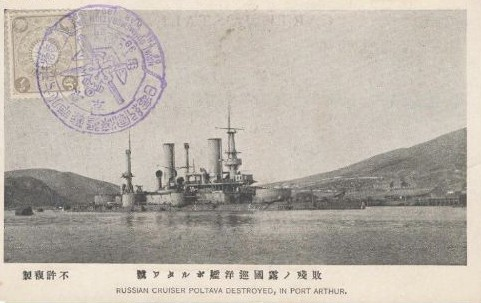
A Japanese postcard showing the wreck of Poltava at Port Arthur

On 23 August, Sevastopol sortied to bombard Japanese troops and struck a mine near her forward magazines while returning to port. She was badly damaged and three of her magazines were flooded. The ship was towed back into Port Arthur and her repairs lasted until 6 November. In the meantime, the new squadron commander, Rear Admiral Robert Viren, decided to use the men and guns of the Pacific Squadron to reinforce the defenses of Port Arthur, and even more guns were stripped from the squadron's ships. By September Poltava had dismounted three 6-inch, four 47- and twenty-six 37-millimeter guns, and Sevastopol lost one 47- and twenty-six 37-millimeter guns. Both ships were lightly damaged by 28-centimeter (11 in) shells in October when the Imperial Japanese Army's siege guns began firing blindly into the harbor. The capture of Hill 203, which overlooked the harbor, on 5 December allowed them to fire directly at the Russian ships, and Poltava was sunk in shallow water that same day by a shell that started a fire in a magazine that eventually exploded. By 7 December all of the Russian battleships except Sevastopol had been sunk and the ship's captain, Nikolai von Essen, anchored her under the guns of the remaining coast defense guns outside the harbor. He rigged torpedo nets and laid a minefield around his ship that thwarted repeated attacks until 16 December when one torpedo struck the ship in the stern during a blinding snowstorm. Badly damaged, Sevastopol was towed to deep water about two weeks later, when Port Arthur surrendered on 2 January 1905 and scuttled.

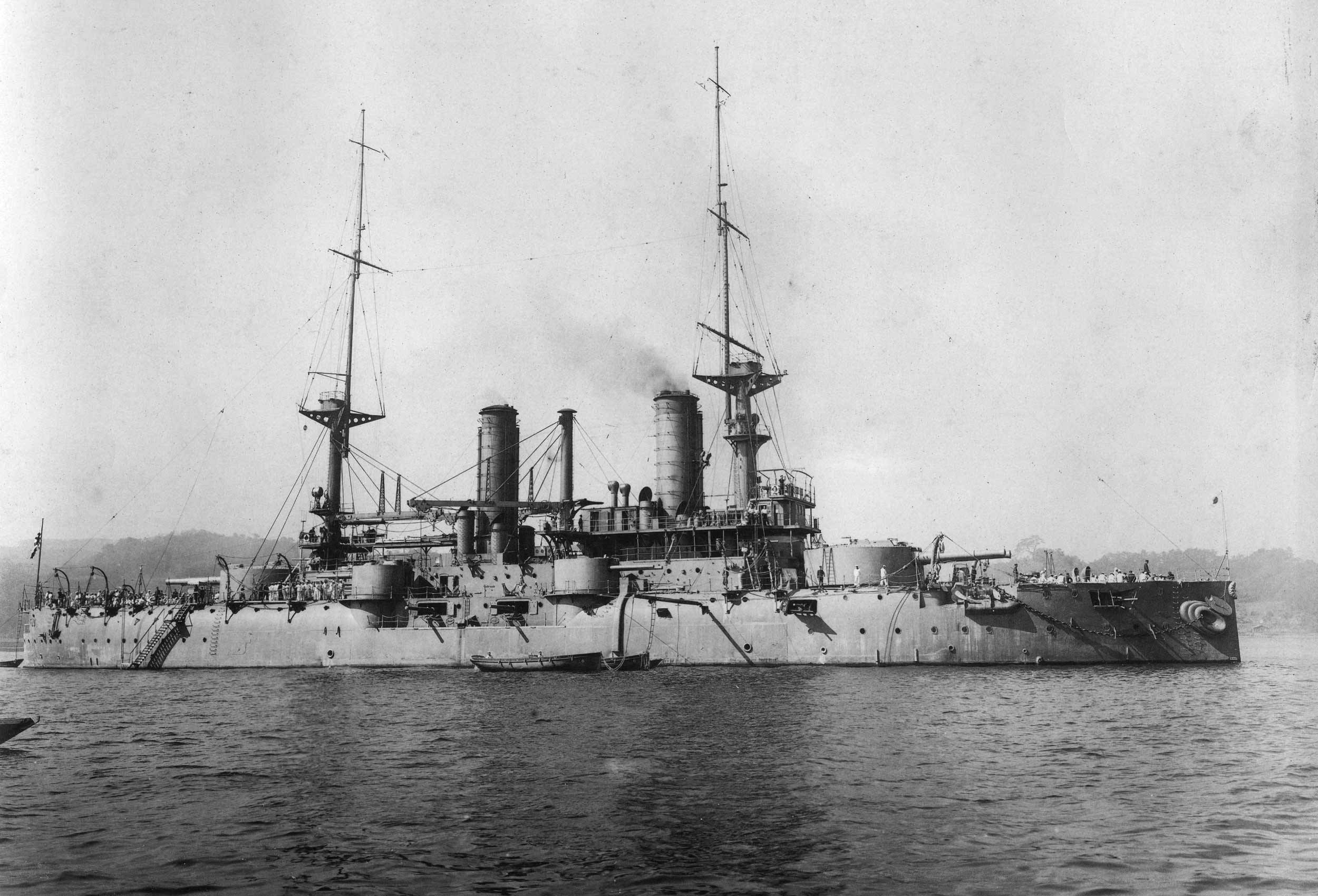
Tango at anchor about 1908–1909

Poltava was subsequently raised, repaired and reclassified as a first-class coastal defense ship in the Imperial Japanese Navy. Renamed Tango (丹後), she served as a gunnery training ship and participated in the siege of Tsingtao at the beginning of World War I. She was sold back to Russia in March 1916 as the countries were now allies against the Central Powers and arrived in Vladivostok on 2 April 1916. Renamed Chesma (Чесма), because her original name was being used by a Gangut-class battleship, the ship arrived in Port Said, Egypt, on 19 September, and later supported efforts to intimidate the Greek Government into supporting Allied operations in Macedonia. She arrived at Alexandrovsk on 16 January 1917 after a brief refit in Birkenhead and became flagship of the Arctic Flotilla. Her crew joined the Bolsheviks in October 1917 and Chesma was captured by the British in Murmansk in March 1918 during the Allied intervention in the Russian Civil War. The ship was already in poor condition, and the British immobilized her when they departed Russia in October 1919. She was stricken from the Navy List on 3 July 1924 and subsequently scrapped.

== Sources ==
- Forczyk, Robert (2009). Russian Battleship vs Japanese Battleship, Yellow Sea 1904–05. London: Osprey. ISBN 978-1-84603-330-8.
- Friedman, Norman (2011). Naval Weapons of World War One: Guns, Torpedoes, Mines and ASW Weapons of All Nations; An Illustrated Directory. Barnsley, UK: Seaforth Publishing. ISBN 978-1-84832-100-7.
- Jentschura, Hansgeorg; Jung, Dieter & Mickel, Peter (1977). Warships of the Imperial Japanese Navy, 1869–1945. Annapolis, Maryland: United States Naval Institute. ISBN 978-0-87021-893-4.
- McLaughlin, Stephen (2003). Russian & Soviet Battleships. Annapolis, Maryland: Naval Institute Press. ISBN 978-1-55750-481-4.
- Pleshakov, Constantine (2002). The Tsar's Last Armada, The Epic Voyage to the Battle Of Tsushima. New York: Basic Books. ISBN 978-0-465-05792-4.
- Preston, Antony (1972). Battleships of World War I: An Illustrated Encyclopedia of the Battleships of All Nations 1914–1918. New York: Galahad Books. ISBN 978-0-88365-300-5.
- Silverstone, Paul H. (1984). Directory of the World's Capital Ships. New York: Hippocrene Books. ISBN 978-0-88254-979-8.
- Watts, Anthony (1990). The Imperial Russian Navy. London: Arms and Armour Press. ISBN 978-0-85368-912-6.
