= Russian battleship Sevastopol (1895) =

Petropavlovsk-class battleship

Coordinates: 38.8125°N 121.241667°E

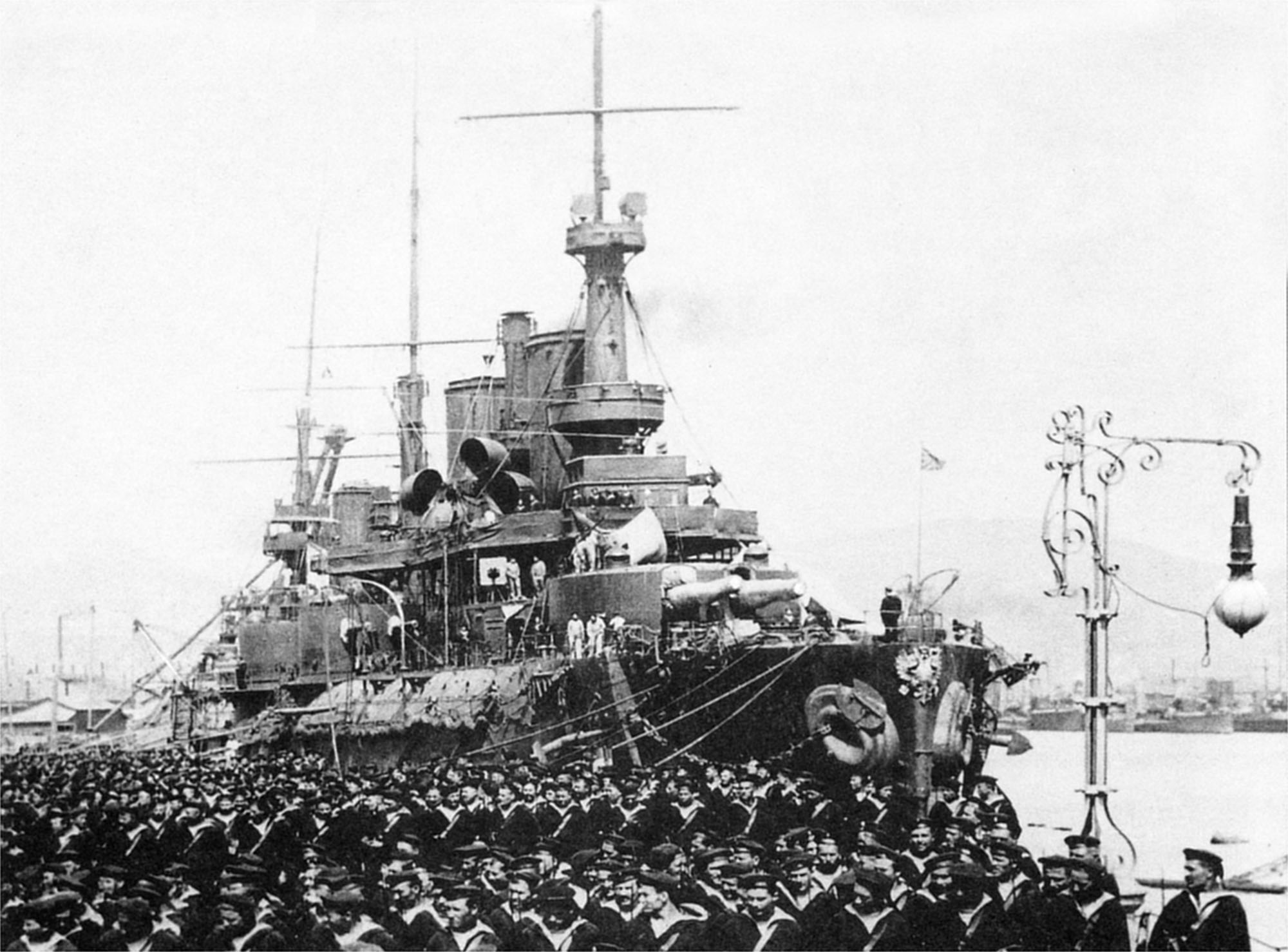
- Sevastopol at Port Arthur in 1904

History

Russian Empire
- Name: Sevastopol
- Namesake: Siege of Sevastopol
- Builder: Galernii Island shipyard, Saint Petersburg, Russian Empire
- Laid down: 19 May 1892 (Note: All dates used in this article are New Style.)
- Launched: 1 June 1895
- Completed: 1899
- In service: 1900
- Fate: Scuttled off Port Arthur, 2 January 1905

General characteristics
- Class & type: Petropavlovsk-class pre-dreadnought battleship
- Displacement: 11,842 long tons (12,032 t)
- Length: 376 ft (115 m)
- Beam: 70 ft (21 m)
- Draft: 28 ft 3 in (8.61 m)
- Installed power: 10,600 shp (7,900 kW); 16 cylindrical boilers
- Propulsion: 2 shafts; 2 triple-expansion steam engines
- Speed: 16 knots (30 km/h; 18 mph)
- Range: 3,750 nmi (6,940 km; 4,320 mi) at 10 knots (19 km/h; 12 mph)
- Complement: 725
- Armament: 2 × twin 12 in (305 mm) guns; 4 × twin, 4 × single 6 in (152 mm) guns; 10 × single 47 mm (1.9 in) guns; 28 × single 37 mm (1.5 in) guns; 4 × 15-inch (381 mm) torpedo tubes; 2 × 18-inch (457 mm) torpedo tubes; 50 × mines
- Armor: Harvey armor; Belt: 10–14.5 in (254–368 mm); Turrets: 10 in (254 mm); Deck: 3 in (76 mm)

Sevastopol (Russian: Севастополь) was the last of three ships in the Petropavlovsk class of pre-dreadnought battleships built for the Imperial Russian Navy in the 1890s.

Named for the siege of Sevastopol during the Crimean War, the ship was commissioned into the First Pacific Squadron of the Russian Pacific Fleet and was stationed at Port Arthur (today Lüshunkou District, Dalian, Liaoning, China), a Russian naval base acquired from China in 1898 as part of the Kwantung Leased Territory. One of the first ships to use Harvey nickel-steel armor and Popov radios, she displaced 11,854 long tons (12,044 t) at full load and was 369 feet (112.5 m) long overall, and mounted a main battery of four 12-inch (305 mm) guns in two twin turrets. She was laid down in May 1892, launched on 1 June 1895 and completed in 1899. Her sea trials lasted until 1900.

Sevastopol saw service in the Russo-Japanese War of 1904–1905. Slightly damaged during a surprise attack on Port Arthur in early February, the ship later participated in several attempts to break out from the besieged port. The most notable of these was the Battle of the Yellow Sea, where she was damaged by several shells but managed to make it back to port with the remnants of the Russian Fleet, leaving one crewman dead and 62 wounded. Immediately after the surrender of Port Arthur, Sevastopol was scuttled to prevent her capture by the Imperial Japanese Navy. The Japanese never raised her. The remains of the ship still lie outside the entrance to the port.

== Design and description ==
The design of the Petropavlovsk-class ships was derived from the battleship Imperator Nikolai I, but was greatly enlarged to accommodate an armament of four 12-inch (305 mm) and eight 8-inch (203 mm) guns. While under construction their armament was revised to consist of more powerful 12-inch guns and the 8-inch guns were replaced by a dozen 6-inch (152 mm) guns. The ships were 376 feet (114.6 m) long overall, with a beam of 70 feet (21.3 m) and a draft of 28 feet 3 inches (8.6 m). Designed to displace 10,960 long tons (11,140 t), Sevastopol was almost 1,000 long tons (1,000 t) overweight and displaced 11,842 long tons (12,032 t) when completed. The ship was powered by two vertical triple-expansion steam engines, each driving one shaft, using steam generated by 16 cylindrical boilers. The engines were rated at 10,600 indicated horsepower (7,900 kW) and designed to reach a top speed of 16 knots (30 km/h; 18 mph), but Sevastopol only reached a speed of 15.3 knots (28.3 km/h; 17.6 mph) from 9,368 indicated horsepower (6,986 kW) during her sea trials. She carried enough coal to give her a range of 3,750 nautical miles (6,940 km; 4,320 mi) at a speed of 10 knots (19 km/h; 12 mph). She had a crew of 662.

The Petropavlovsk-class ships' main battery consisted of four 12-inch guns mounted in two twin-gun turrets, one each forward and one aft of the superstructure. Designed to fire one round per 90 seconds, the actual rate of fire was half that. Their secondary armament consisted of twelve Canet six-inch quick-firing (QF) guns. Eight of these were mounted in four twin-gun wing turrets and the remaining guns were positioned in unprotected embrasures on the sides of the hull amidships. Smaller guns were carried for defense against torpedo boats, including ten QF 47-millimeter (1.9 in) Hotchkiss guns and twenty-eight Maxim QF 37-millimeter (1.5 in) guns. They were also armed with six torpedo tubes, four 15-inch (381 mm) tubes above water and two 18-inch (457 mm) submerged tubes, all mounted on the broadside. They carried 50 mines to be used to protect her anchorage.

The Russians could not manufacture the Harvey armor used by Sevastopol, so the ship's armor was ordered from Bethlehem Steel in America, although only her waterline armor belt was made from Harvey armor and the rest was nickel steel. The armor belt was 10–14.5 inches (254–368 mm) thick. The main gun turrets had a maximum thickness of 10 inches (254 mm) of armor and her deck armor ranged from 2 to 3 inches (51 to 76 mm) in thickness.

== Construction and career ==
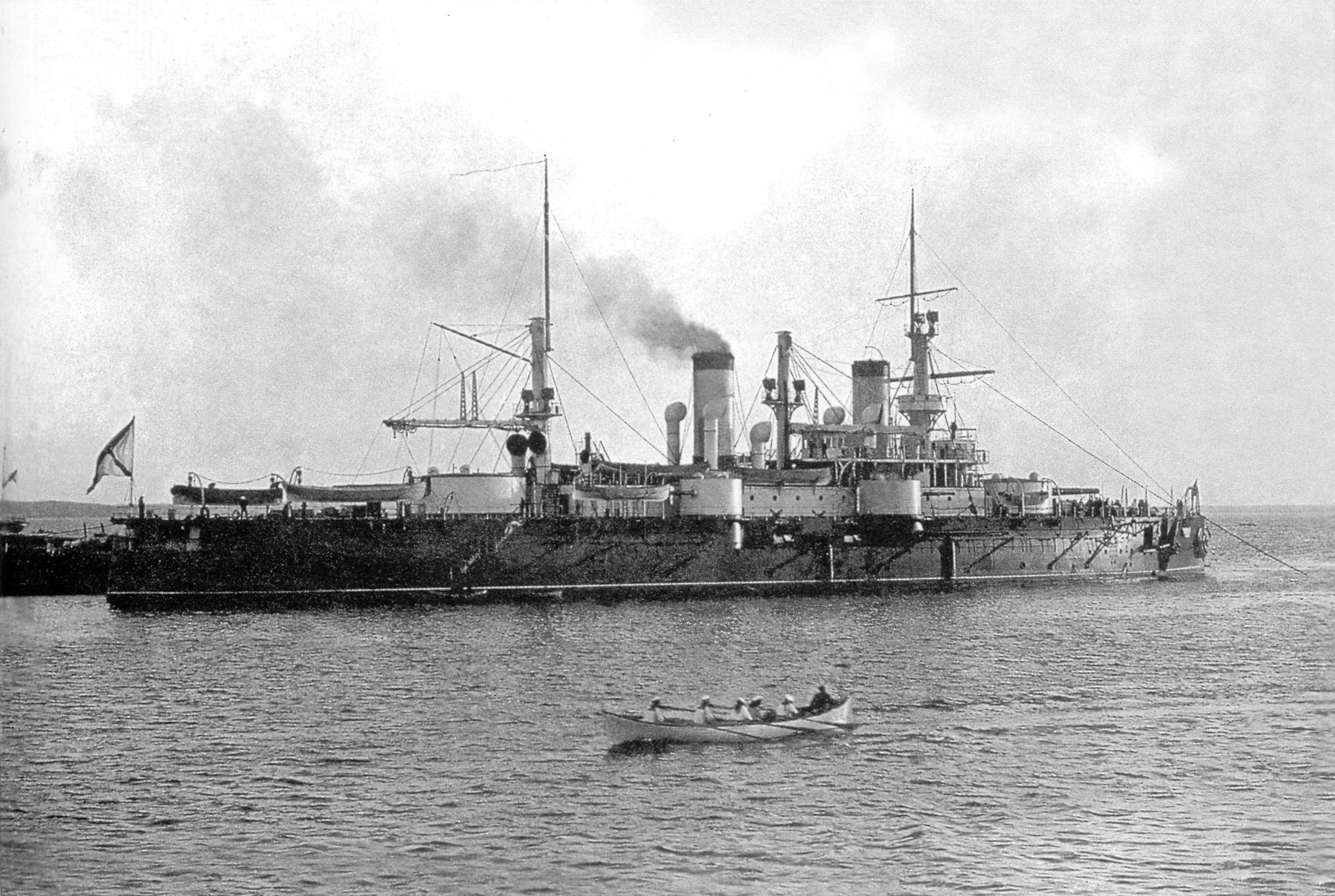
Sevastopol at Kronstadt in 1900

Sevastopol, named for the siege of Sevastopol during the Crimean War, was laid down at the Galernii Island shipyard in Saint Petersburg on 7 March 1892. Construction was led by two engineers, E. P. Andruschenko and N. I. Afanasyev, and began on 7 May 1892, about the same time as the battleship Sissoi Veliky was laid down. The ceremony was attended by Alexander III of Russia and Tsesarevich Nicholas. Sevastopol was launched on 1 June 1895 and, after the completion of her hull and decks in 1898, was transferred to Kronstadt where her armor and guns were installed. Sevastopol was finished in 1899 and Nikolai Chernishev became her captain, a post which he would retain until 17 March 1904, when Nikolai von Essen assumed command.

Sevastopol began her sea trials on 16 October 1899, and was commissioned after their conclusion into the Imperial Russian Navy. She and her sister ships were transferred to Port Arthur, which was then the base of the First Squadron of the Russian Pacific Fleet. In September 1900, Popov radios were installed on Sevastopol and her sister Poltava, the first Russian battleships to have them. They were also painted white, the same color as the other ships in the First Pacific Squadron. She then left for Port Arthur, arriving on 13 April 1901. As Russia was not at war with any Far East countries at that time, Sevastopol stayed in port, inactive.

=== Battle of Port Arthur ===
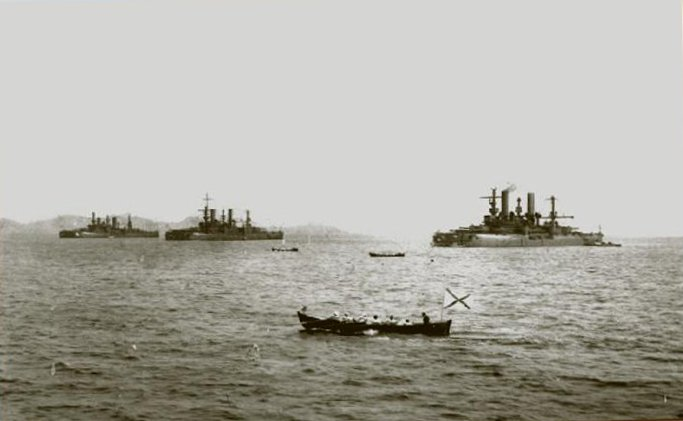
Sevastopol (rear center) and her sisters

After the Japanese victory in the First Sino-Japanese War of 1894–1895, both Russia and Japan had ambitions to control Manchuria and Korea, resulting in tensions between the two nations. Japan had begun negotiations to reduce the tensions in 1901, but the Russian government was slow and uncertain in its replies because it had not yet decided exactly how to resolve the problems. Japan interpreted this as deliberate prevarication designed to buy time to complete the Russian armament programs. The situation was worsened by Russia's failure to withdraw its troops from Manchuria in October 1903 as promised. The final straws were the news of Russian timber concessions in northern Korea and the Russian refusal to acknowledge Japanese interests in Manchuria while continuing to place conditions on Japanese activities in Korea. These actions caused the Japanese government to decide in December 1903 that war was inevitable. As tensions with Japan increased, the Pacific Squadron began mooring in the outer harbor at night in order to react more quickly to any Japanese attempt to land troops in Korea.

In early February 1904, the Japanese Navy launched a surprise attack on the Russian fleet at Port Arthur. Sevastopol was hit by one shell, either six or eight inches in diameter, that wounded two men on her bridge. She soon turned in pursuit along with other ships of the Russian fleet, all firing their forward guns, but she failed to score any hits. On 26 March 1904, Sevastopol was accidentally rammed by Peresvet, damaging a propeller. After the attack on Port Arthur, the First Pacific Squadron tried to break out several times. During one attempt on 23 June, Admiral Wilgelm Vitgeft, commanding the Pacific Fleet, retreated after encountering the Japanese fleet. Approaching the harbor, Sevastopol moved slightly out of formation and hit a mine that killed 11 and caused severe flooding, but managed to get inside the harbor and drop anchor. She was under repair for six weeks, during which time a fire broke out on deck, killing 2 and wounding 28. The Russian battleships were too big to fit into the dry dock at Port Arthur, so large caissons were built to provide access to the ships' hulls. On 9 August, with the Japanese Third Army assaulting the outer defenses of Port Arthur, the First Pacific Squadron sortied from its base. Even though Sevastopol was not fully repaired, she sailed with the rest of the fleet with one gun in her aft turret remaining inoperable. They later engaged the Japanese fleet in what would become the Battle of the Yellow Sea.

Although in the center of the Russian line during the battle, Sevastopol was only slightly damaged during the day. In the evening, the Russians massed their fire on the Japanese flagship Mikasa, at that time 11 kilometers (6.8 mi) away. The Japanese battleships returned fire and Sevastopol suffered several shell hits to her superstructure, which killed one man and wounded 62 others. A few minutes later, Mikasa was hit by two 12-inch (305 mm) shells and one 6-inch (152 mm) shell from Retvizan and Sevastopol, which caused 40 casualties. Soon after that, when it seemed that the Russians would be able to escape to Vladivostok, two 12-inch shells from Asahi penetrated the conning tower of the Russian flagship Tsesarevich, killing Vitgeft and the helmsman, severely wounding the captain, and causing the ship to come to a dead stop after executing a sharp turn. Thinking that this was a maneuver planned by Vitgeft, the Russian line started to execute the same turn, causing all of the ships directly behind Tsesarevich, including Sevastopol, to maneuver wildly to avoid hitting the stationary flagship. Prince Pavel Ukhtomski, second in command of the squadron, who was on the Peresvet, proceeded to signal the other Russian ships via semaphore to steam back to Port Arthur, although the signals were only gradually recognized by Pobeda, Poltava, Pallada and Sevastopol. Sevastopol had one 6-inch (152 mm) and two 47-millimeter (1.9 in) guns knocked out during the battle.

Returning to Port Arthur on 10 August, the squadron found that the city was already under siege by the Japanese Third Army led by Baron Nogi Maresuke. On 23 August, Sevastopol bombarded a Japanese battery in an effort to escape along with nine smaller ships, but after she neutralized the battery, she returned to port after a Japanese lookout spotted the approaching ships. As she was maneuvering back into Port Arthur, she struck another mine and required repairs. On 5 December the Third Army captured 203 Meter Hill, a crucial position that overlooked the harbor. From there, the Japanese were able to fire on Sevastopol and other ships of the First Pacific Squadron that had survived the Yellow Sea battle. The ships at that time were about 5.7 kilometers (3.5 mi) away from the hill, placing them within range of Japanese shore artillery. By 9 December four battleships and two cruisers had been sunk by the Japanese. Sevastopol, although hit five times by 11-inch (279 mm) shells, managed to move away from the western harbor and out of range of the guns to the minor harbor of White Wolf, where she could be defended by torpedo nets and booms. Within the defensive surroundings of White Wolf, Essen started to plan a sortie through the blockade to Vladivostok or a rendezvous with the Second Pacific Squadron, at that time coaling at Madagascar. At the same time, the commanding admiral of the Imperial Japanese Navy, Tōgō Heihachirō, as instructed by Emperor Meiji in Tokyo, ordered the destruction of the battleship by six waves of destroyers, along with some torpedo boats that were launched from the Fuji and Mikasa.

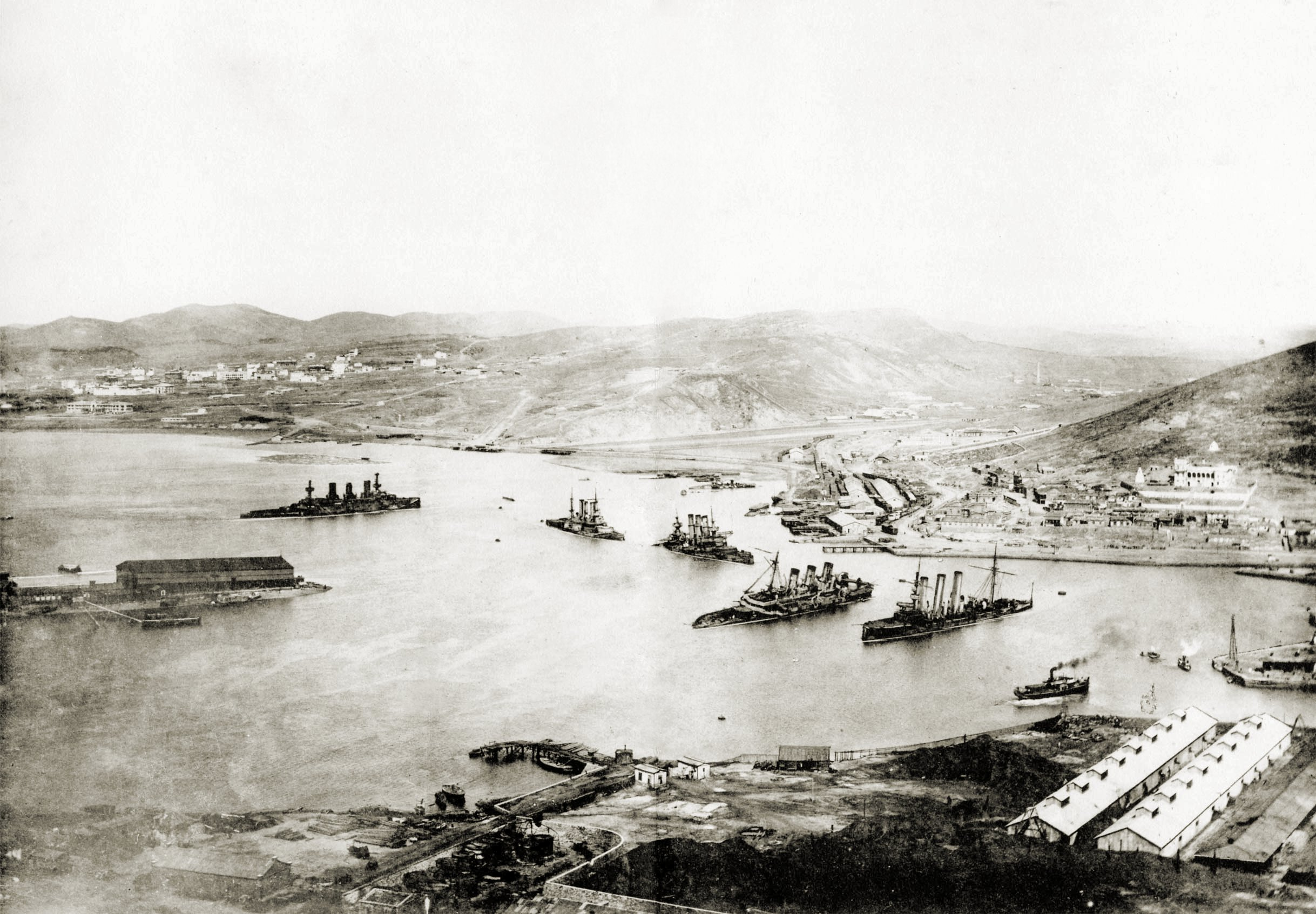
A view of the scuttled Russian ships at Port Arthur; Sevastopol is not visible.

The torpedo boat and destroyer attacks lasted three weeks, during which 80 torpedoes were launched at Sevastopol. Of these, four hit. The four successful torpedoes were launched on 18 December. Three of them hit the torpedo nets that had been placed around the ship, while the other hit one of the ship's propellers. Although severely damaged, Sevastopol remained afloat and sank two destroyers and damaged six others, killing 35 sailors and five officers. A Japanese cruiser attempting to attack Sevastopol was sunk by a mine in the harbor. When he received news of the surrender of the land fortifications on 2 January 1905, Essen decided to surrender, but scuttled the ship in 55 meters (180 ft) of water by opening the seacocks on one side so that the ship could not be salvaged by the Japanese. His other option, a run to Vladivostok, had already been eliminated due to the damage to his propellers by the torpedo. For the act of scuttling Sevastopol, Essen was awarded the Order of St. George. Nevertheless, a dispatch from Tokyo reported that it sank as a result of a Japanese torpedo attack.

Due to the depth of water in which she had sunk, and her position, Sevastopol was the only battleship that was not salvaged by the Japanese at Port Arthur. What remains of her is still outside the entrance to Port Arthur. Poltava, one of her sister ships, was also scuttled at Port Arthur and re-floated as the Japanese Tango.
