= Boyarin =

Boyarin (Russian: Боярин) may refer to:

- Russian cruiser Boyarin (1901), a light cruiser built for the Imperial Russian Navy
- Daniel Boyarin (born 1946), Jewish-American historian of religion

== See also ==
- Boyar
