= Russian cruiser Boyarin =

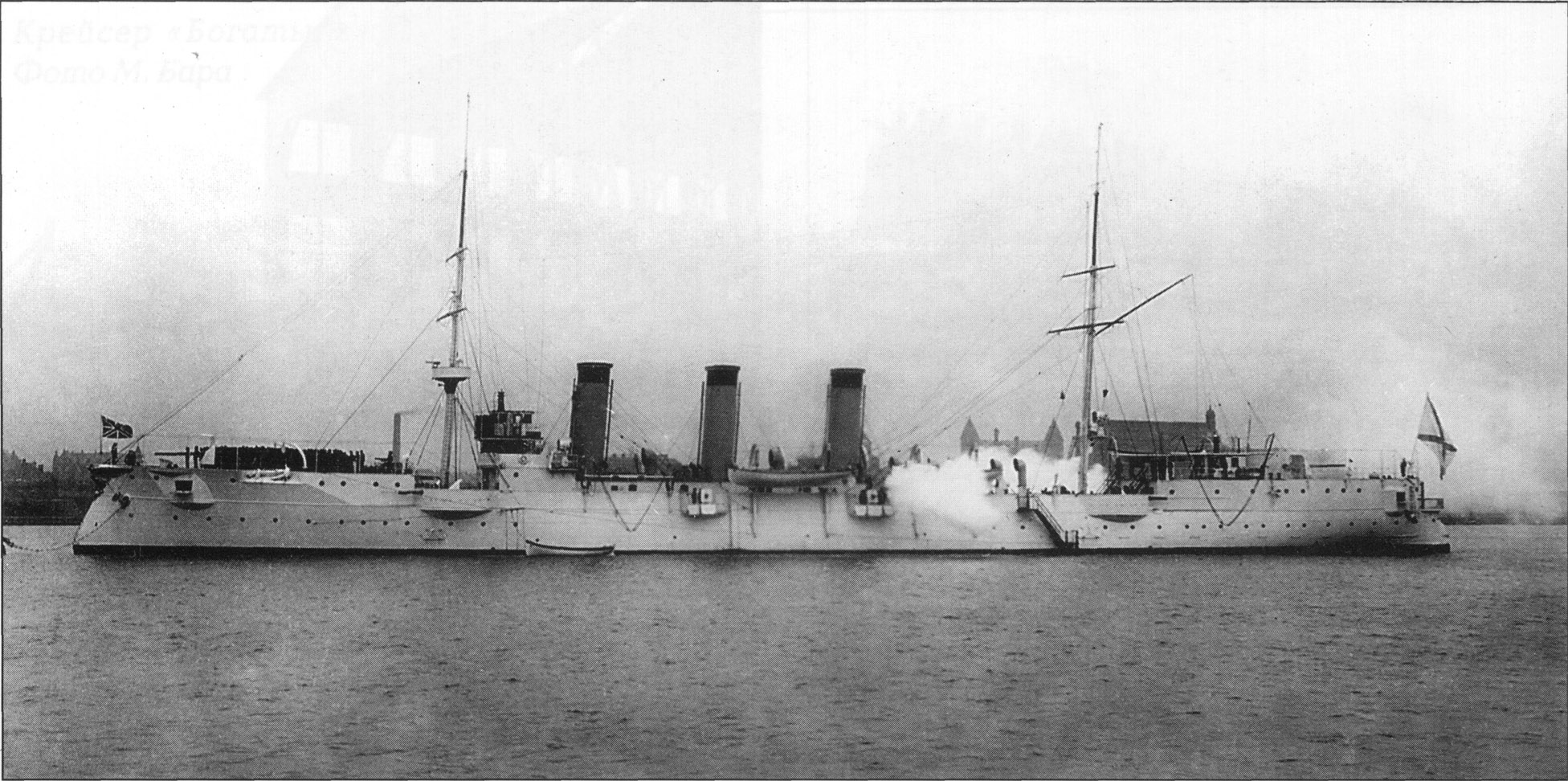

History

Russian Empire
- Name: Boyarin
- Builder: Burmeister & Wain, Copenhagen, Denmark
- Laid down: 24 September 1900
- Launched: 26 May 1901
- Completed: 1902
- Commissioned: 1 September 1902
- Fate: Sunk by mine 12 February 1904

General characteristics
- Type: Protected cruiser
- Displacement: 3,200 long tons (3,251 t)
- Length: 105.2 m (345 ft)
- Beam: 12.5 m (41 ft)
- Draught: 4.88 m (16 ft)
- Propulsion: 2 shaft reciprocating vertical triple-expansion steam engines; 16 Belleville coal-fired boilers; 8,600 kW (11,500 hp)
- Speed: 22 knots (41 km/h; 25 mph)
- Endurance: 3000 nm
- Complement: 16 officers + 315 cew
- Armament: 6 120 mm (4.7 in) Canet guns; 8 Hotchkiss rapid fire 47 mm (1.9 in) guns; 4 37 mm (1.5 in) Hotchkiss guns; 2 Maxim machine guns; 5 381 mm (15 in) torpedo tubes
- Armour: Krupp armour; deck: 50 mm (2.0 in); conning tower: 76 mm (3 in)

Boyarin (Russian: Боярин, "Nobleman") was a protected cruiser built for the Imperial Russian Navy by Burmeister & Wain in Copenhagen, Denmark. She served in the Russian Pacific Fleet and was sunk by a Russian naval mine near the entrance to Port Arthur, Manchuria, just after the start of the Russo-Japanese War in 1904.

== History ==
A contract to build four second-rank protected cruisers to reinforce the Russian Pacific Fleet was issued by the Marine Ministry on 15 April 1899. It was intended that these ships be built in Danzig to the design of the cruiser Novik for reconnaissance, aviso and destroyer support duties. However, due to political pressure from the throne, the contract for the Boyarin was issued to the Danish firm of Burmeister & Wain (the Dowager Empress Maria Feodorvna was from Denmark). This created numerous issues. The cost of the Boyarin was far higher than expected, due to higher wages in Denmark and need for the shipyard to import many components. Changes made to the design resulted in problems with stability, and efforts to compensate by increasing her displacement from 2600 tons to 3075 tons resulted in a lower speed. Despite the increase in displacement, she was inferior to Novik in ammunition storage, the number of naval mines and layout of the bridge.

The keel was laid of 24 September 1900, with Commander V I Litvinov appointed chief equipping officer. She was launched on 26 May 1901, without any presence of the Imperial Russian Navy during the ceremony – a breach of tradition and etiquette. After launching, Commander Vladimir Fedorovich Sarychev, former captain of the gunboat Gilyak, who had just returned from the Boxer Rebellion in China, was appointed captain. During factory acceptance testing in June 1902, severe vibrations revealed that the practical operational speed was only 14 knots.

=== Armament ===
The main armament consisted of six 120 mm (4.7 in) Canet guns in shielded mountings, one each at the bow and stern and four in sponsons. Anti-torpedo boat armament consisted of eight 47 mm guns, four in the bow and stern casemates and four in midship sponsons. Five torpedo tubes with 11 torpedoes were placed one on the stern and two on each side, all above water.

=== Protection ===
The armour used was Krupp plate, 50 mm (2 in) on the deck and 76 mm (3 in) on the conning tower.

=== Machinery ===
The powerplant consisted of two shafts with triple expansion steam engines and 16 Belleville-type boilers.

== Operational record ==
Boyarin arrived in Kronstadt on 6 October 1902, and Commander Sarychev was formally placed in command. On 8 October she was included in the Russian Pacific Fleet reinforcement squadron under the command of Admiral Baron Stackelberg, but broke down and had to be repaired in Denmark on the way. Upon rejoining the squadron on 19 November at Isle of Portland in England, Commander Sarychev reported to local authorities that his chief engineer had died of gunshot wounds. After passing through the Suez Canal, Boyarin was assigned to detached duty in a show of force in the Persian Gulf to reinforce Russian political interests and influence.

On 4 to 8 March 1903, she visited Kuwait, along with the French colonial cruiser L'Infernet. Boyarin was carrying the Russian Consul at Bushire (in modern Iran). The Russian Consul met Ibn Saud, the ruler of Najd, who was in Kuwait at the time, and promised him financial assistance and rifles. On 15 March, Boyarin, still accompanied by L'Infernet, stopped in Muscat. All of this caused concern to the British, who considered any foreign interference in the Persian Gulf area 'a very grave menace to British interests.' They refused to permit coaling rights at any British port, and the Russian government was forced to request that a French collier based in Djibouti escort Boyarin through the Indian Ocean. Boyarin reached Port Arthur on 13 May 1903.

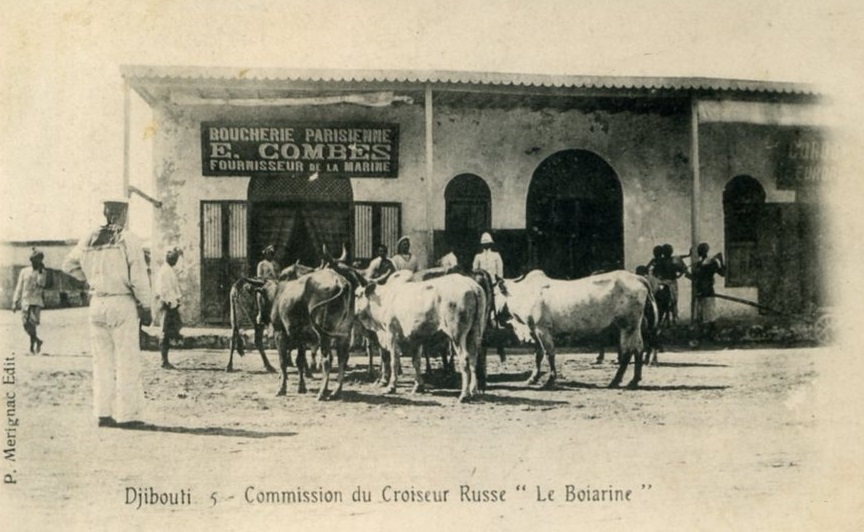
Djibouti 1902. Cattle destined for Boyarin

She was assigned to maneuvers with the First Pacific Squadron in the Yellow Sea, followed in June by maneuvers in the Pacific Ocean. In August she participated in several training exercises. Viceroy Yevgeni Ivanovich Alekseyev praised her in his reports to Petrograd for her utility and low consumption of coal.

With the increasing diplomatic tension between the Empire of Japan and Russia, Boyarin was deployed to Chemulpo (now Incheon) in Korea in December 1903 to safeguard Russian interests. She was relieved by the arrival of the Varyag on 30 December 1903 and returned to Port Arthur.

=== Battle of Port Arthur ===
On the night of 8 February 1904, in the Battle of Port Arthur, the opening battle of the Russo-Japanese War, Imperial Japanese Navy destroyers launched a pre-emptive strike on the First Pacific Squadron anchored in the roadstead outside Port Arthur. Admiral Oskar Stark sent a squadron that included Boyarin in pursuit, but it succeeded only in attacking a Russian destroyer heading into port before returning to Port Arthur.

Several hours later a fleet of Japanese ships was observed to be approaching, and Boyarin was deployed on the outer roadstead. The fleet was Admiral Togo Heihachiro’s main battle fleet with six battleships and nine cruisers. Boyarin fired three shots at the fleet before fleeing back into the protection of Port Arthur and raising the alarm.

That evening, Boyarin received orders to escort the minelayer Yenisei to Talienwan on the west side of Port Arthur to complete laying of the last minefields.

On 11 February 1904 [O.S. 29 January] Yenisei struck one of her own mines, exploded, and sank. Inexperienced shore-based observers panicked and reported another attack by Japanese destroyers, and Boyarin was dispatched with four Russian destroyers to investigate. The cruiser also struck a mine laid by Yenisei, at 0816 on12 February 1904 [O.S. 31 January]. The explosion killed ten crew members, and she sank up to her portholes. Although efforts were made to patch the breach she began to list, and Commander Sarychev gave the order to abandon ship. That evening, a team from Port Arthur found her grounded near the shoreline, evidently with repairable damage. However, she drifted during a storm that night, striking at least one other mine, and sank. Several days later, the wreckage was discovered on the bottom around 40 meters (130 ft) from the shoreline and further attempts at salvage were discontinued. Sarychev was found guilty at a court-martial of premature abandonment of the damaged vessel, and spent the remainder of the siege of Port Arthur on shore duty.

== Notes and references ==
=== References ===
- Brook, Peter (2000). "Armoured Cruiser vs. Armoured Cruiser: Ulsan 14 August 1904". In Preston, Antony (ed.). Warship 2000–2001. London: Conway Maritime Press. ISBN 0-85177-791-0.
- Budzbon, Przemysław (1985). "Russia". In Gray, Randal (ed.). Conway's All the World's Fighting Ships 1906–1921. Annapolis, Maryland: Naval Institute Press. pp. 291–325. ISBN 0-85177-245-5.
- Campbell, N. J. M. (1979). "Russia". In Chesneau, Roger & Kolesnik, Eugene M. (eds.). Conway's All the World's Fighting Ships 1860–1905. New York: Mayflower Books. pp. 170–217. ISBN 0-8317-0302-4.
- McLaughlin, Stephen (1999). "From Ruirik to Ruirik: Russia's Armoured Cruisers". In Preston, Antony (ed.). Warship 1999–2000. London: Conway Maritime Press. ISBN 0-85177-724-4.
- Watts, Anthony J. (1990). The Imperial Russian Navy. London: Arms and Armour. ISBN 0-85368-912-1.
