= Manuil Ozerov =

Russian admiral (1852–1919)

Manuil Ozerov Мануил Озеров
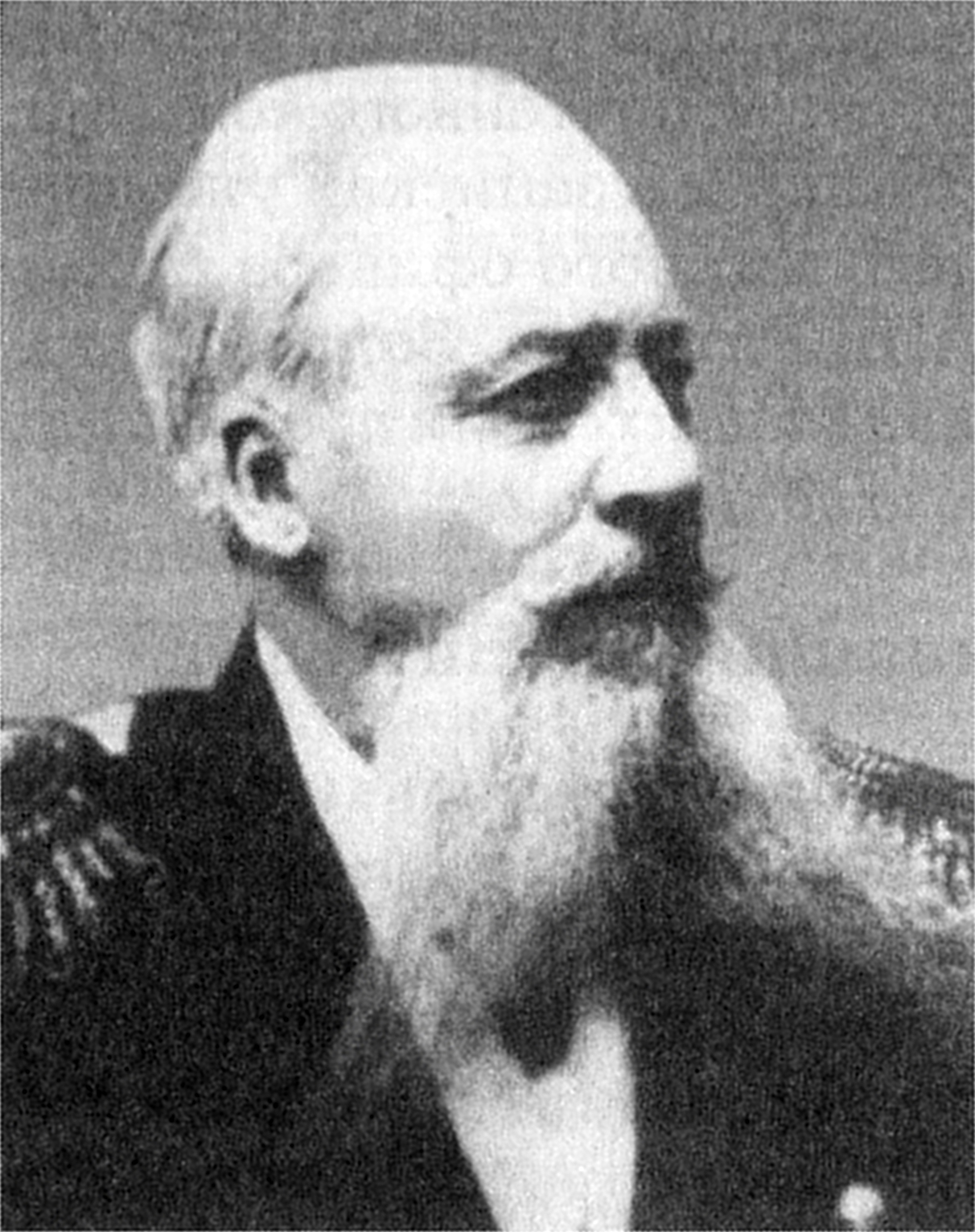
- Born: October 15, 1852; Belmovo, Tula, Russian Empire
- Died: November 6, 1919 (aged 67); Belyov, Tula, Soviet Russia
- Military career
- Allegiance: Russia
- Branch: Imperial Russian Navy
- Service years: 1867 – 1909
- Rank: Counter Admiral
- Commands: Sissoi Veliky
- Conflicts: Russo-Japanese War; Battle of Tsushima (POW)

Manuil Vasilyevich Ozerov was a Russian Counter Admiral during the early 20th century. He was known for commanding the Sissoi Veliky during the Battle of Tsushima and was one of the few officers who managed to survive the battle.

== Military career ==
Manuil was born on October 15, 1852, at the village of Belmovo at the Tula Governorate. His father was Vasily Andreevich Ozerov who was of nobility, a court councilor and the head of the village while his mother was Evpraksia Vasilievna Spolokhov. He proceeded to enter the Naval Cadet Corps and graduated as a Garde de la Marine at the 5th Naval Crew on April 17, 1871. He was promoted to michman on May 8, 1873, and seconded to the Naval College on October 4, 1874. Ozerov received his first command on the auditor Ne Tron' Menya from November 3, 1876, to March 27, 1880, while being promoted to lieutenant on January 1, 1877. His next command was the monitor Uragan on 1880 and was made commander of the economic company on October 30, 1881. On May 20, 1883, he became the inspector for the Minin which was serving on the Pacific Ocean but was decommissioned on November 26, 1884, due to familial reasons. Ozerov returned on December 15, 1884, and was assigned to the Black Sea Fleet and assigned to the 1st Naval Crew of the fleet 4 days later. From June 6, 1887, to October 30, 1887, and February 15, 1888, to August 13, 1890, he was the acting senior officer aboard the Chernomorets and briefly acted as a senior officer of the steamer Eriklik from October 30, 1887, to February 15, 1888.

Ozerov was promoted to Captain 2nd Rank on April 1, 1890, and received command of the Dvenadsat Apostolov from August 13 to October 1, 1890, before returning to the Chernomorets from October 1, 1890, to October 12. He was then made the assistant commander of the 1st Naval Crew from October 31, 1890, to April 16, 1891, before being made the head of the musicians of the 31st Naval Crew on April 23, 1892. On January 1, 1893, he received command of the Ingul but was transferred to the Baltic Fleet at the 35th Naval Crew on January 1, 1885. Ozerov continued with his musical career as he headed the choir of port musicians from September 27, 1892, to April 26, 1894, but was transferred to the coastal defense battleship Novgorod on January 1, 1885. Ozerov then became the Junior assistant commander of Kronstadt from May 15, 1895, to December 16, 1896, and was transferred to the transport Samoyed on December 16, 1897. He was promoted to Captain 1st Rank on December 6, 1898, and was made flag-captain of the coastal headquarters of the 2nd Naval Division on January 4, 1899, and the flag captain of the commander of the training squadron of the Baltic Sea on April 3, 1899.

On December 6, 1899, he was given command of the General-Admiral and was enrolled to the 11th Naval Crew on January 19, 1900. From August 24, 1900, to June 7, 1902, he served on the Poltava and command of the 13th Naval Crew from April 16, 1903, to March 28, 1904. After being given command of the Sissoi Veliky since September 9, 1902, he went on to participate at the Battle of Tsushima but after the ship was sunk, he was taken prisoner. Ozerov then took up maritime piloting as he became commander of the lightship London and promoted to Counter Admiral on November 5, 1907, but retired by 1909. Ozerov died on November 6, 1919, at the town of Belev and was buried at the Belevsky Spaso-Preobrazhensky Monastery.

== Awards ==
- Order of Saint Stanislaus, III Class (January 1, 1878)
- Order of Saint Anna, III Class (January 1, 1887)
- Order of Saint Stanislaus, II Class (January 1, 1892)
- Order of Saint Anna, II Class (December 6, 1894)
- Order of Saint Vladimir, IV Class with bow (1894) for 25 operations
- Order of Saint Vladimir, III Class (March 28, 1904)
- Order of Saint Vladimir II Class with swords (January 8, 1907)

=== Foreign Awards ===
- Greece: Order of the Redeemer, Commander's Cross (1901)
