= Russian battleship Sissoi Veliky =

Russian pre-dreadnought battleship

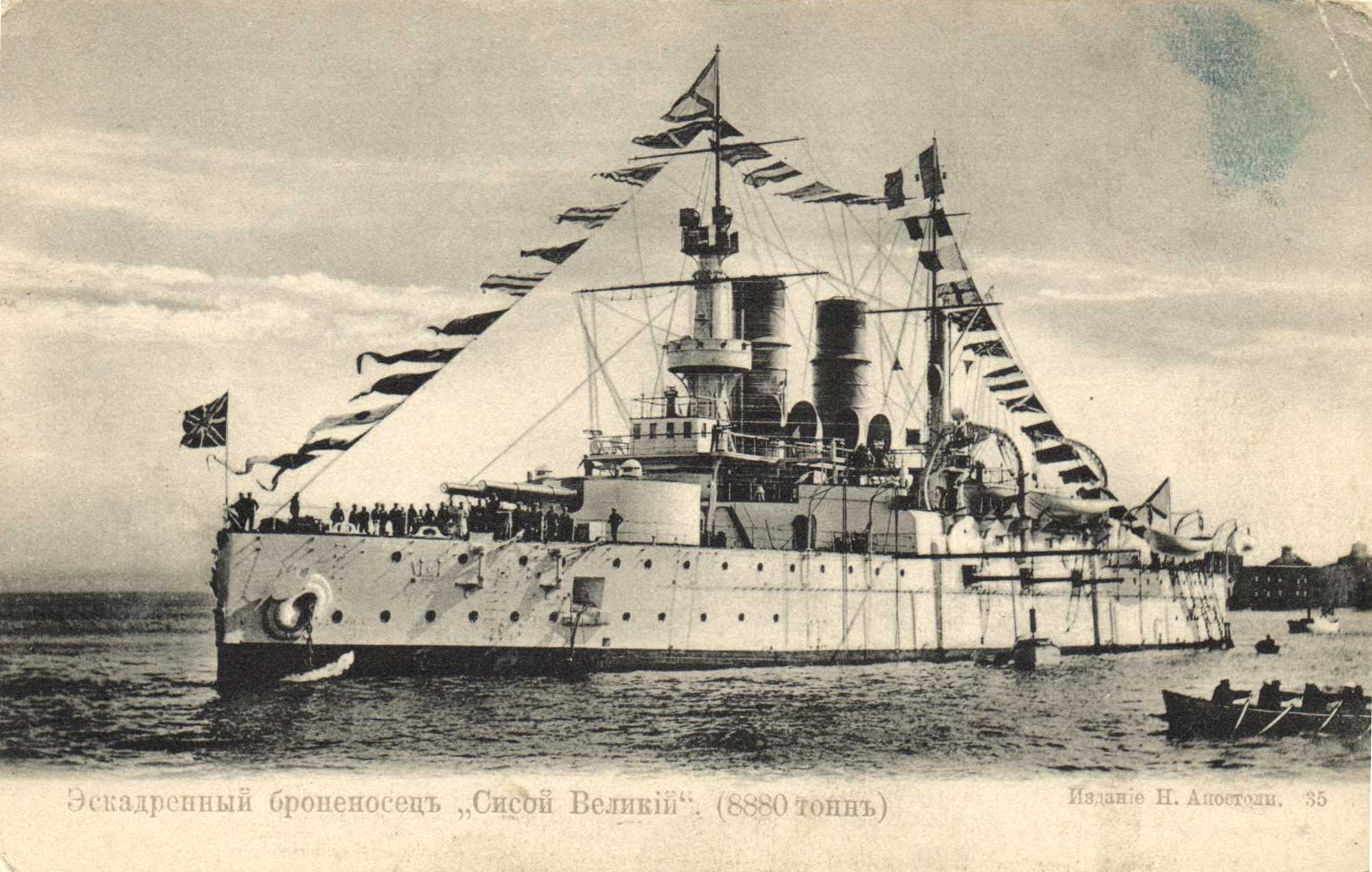
- Postcard of Sissoi Veliky at anchor

Class overview
- Builders: Franco-Russian Works
- Operators: Imperial Russian Navy
- Preceded by: Tri Sviatitelia
- Succeeded by: Petropavlovsk class
- Built: 1891–1896
- In service: 1896–1905
- Completed: 1
- Lost: 1

History

Russian Empire
- Name: Sissoi Veliky
- Namesake: St. Sisoes the Great of Egypt
- Builder: New Admiralty Shipyard, Saint Petersburg, Russia
- Laid down: August 7 [O.S. July 25], 1891
- Launched: June 2 [O.S. May 20], 1894
- Completed: September 1896
- Commissioned: October 18 [O.S. October 5], 1896
- Fate: Sunk at the Battle of Tsushima, May 28 [O.S. May 15] 1905

General characteristics
- Type: Pre-dreadnought battleship
- Displacement: 10,400 long tons (10,567 t)
- Length: 107.23 m (351 ft 10 in)
- Beam: 20.73 m (68 ft 0 in)
- Draught: 7.77 m (25 ft 6 in)
- Installed power: 8,500 ihp (6,300 kW); 12 Belleville boilers
- Propulsion: 2 shafts; 2 triple-expansion steam engines
- Speed: 15.7 knots (29.1 km/h; 18.1 mph)
- Range: 2,800 nmi (5,200 km; 3,200 mi) at 10 knots (19 km/h; 12 mph)
- Complement: 586
- Armament: 2 × twin 12 in (305 mm) guns; 6 × single 6 in (152 mm) guns; 12 × single 47 mm (1.9 in) guns; 18 × single 37 mm (1.5 in) guns; 6 × 15 in (381 mm) torpedo tubes
- Armour: Waterline belt: 6–14 in (152–356 mm); Barbettes: 10 in (254 mm); Gun turrets: 12 in (305 mm); Casemates: 5 in (127 mm); Deck: 2.5–3 in (64–76 mm); Conning tower: 9 in (229 mm); Bulkheads: 6–9 in (152–229 mm)

Sissoi Veliky (Russian: Сисой Великий) was a pre-dreadnought battleship built for the Imperial Russian Navy in the 1890s. The ship's construction was marred by organizational, logistical and engineering problems and dragged on for more than five years. She was commissioned in October 1896 with an appalling number of design and construction faults, and only a few of them were fixed during her lifetime. Immediately after sea trials, Sissoi Veliky sailed to the Mediterranean to enforce the naval blockade of Crete during the Greco-Turkish War. On March 15 [O.S. March 3], 1897 she suffered a devastating explosion of the aft gun turret that killed 21 men. After nine months in the docks of Toulon for repairs, the ship sailed to the Far East to reinforce the Russian presence there. In the summer of 1900, Sissoi Veliky supported the international campaign against the Boxer Rebellion in China. Sailors from Sissoi Veliky and the battleship Navarin participated in the defence of the International Legations in Beijing for more than two months.

In 1902 the ship returned to Kronstadt for repairs, but very little was achieved until the early losses of the Russo-Japanese War of 1904–1905 caused the formation of the Second Pacific Squadron to relieve the Russian forces blockaded in Port Arthur. Sissoi Veliky sailed for the Far East with the rest of the Baltic battleships and participated in the Battle of Tsushima on May 27 [O.S. May 14] 1905. She survived the daytime artillery duel with Admiral Tōgō Heihachirō's ships, but was badly damaged and taking on water. During the night Japanese destroyers scored a torpedo hit on the ship that damaged her steering. The next morning the ship was unable to maintain speed because of flooding, and her crew surrendered to Japanese armed merchant cruisers. The ship capsized later that morning with the loss of 47 crewmen.

== Background ==
In 1881 a committee of admirals headed by General Admiral Alexei Alexandrovich drafted an ambitious program of rearming the Baltic Fleet with 16 ocean-going battleships and 13 cruisers. The man in charge of shipbuilding, Admiral Ivan Shestakov, saw little value in building uniform ship classes and regularly changed design and construction targets to match foreign novelties of the day. In 1885 the program was reduced to nine battleships; the freed funds were reallocated to torpedo boats in response to German advances with these weapons. The first ten years of the 1881 program were marked by indecision, bureaucracy and a shortage of funds, and only two battleships were actually built (Imperator Aleksandr II, Imperator Nikolai I, and one coastal defense ship Gangut). These were relatively small and slow ships, each with a single frontal barbette housing 12-inch (305 mm) guns (in case of Gangut, a single gun). (Note: Gangut was ridiculed by the officers: "One mast, one funnel, one gun. One [big] misconception." (Russian: "Одна мачта, одна труба, одна пушка. Одно недоразумение.").)

The fourth ship (the future Navarin) was planned as an even cheaper and smaller (6,400-long-ton (6,500 t)) ship. However, the superiority of the German Brandenburg-class battleship compelled the Imperial Navy to lift cost and size constraints and build a large battleship with two main gun turrets. The Franco-Russian Works hastily proposed a draft based on the British Trafalgar class. The Navy hesitated, and awarded the contract to the private company only after a push from Tsar Alexander III. Navarin, laid down in July 1889 and launched in 1891, set the standard configuration for all Russian pre-dreadnought battleships, but in 1890, when the Navy discussed plans for the fifth battleship, the future was uncertain. The admirals were still discussing whether the Navy should concentrate on large battleships, smaller coastal defence ships or on the ocean-going cruisers.

1891 draft with barbettes	Post-1893 draft with turrets

In September 1890 the Naval Technical Committee (MTK) rolled out a proposal for a medium-size (8,500-long-ton (8,600 t), 331-foot (100.9 m) long) battleship armed with three single 12-inch guns mounted in barbettes. Codenamed Gangut No. 2, it attempted to blend the hull of Alexander II and the armament of Navarin in a tightly budgeted, compromised design. None of the admirals who reviewed the proposal was satisfied with it, and the MTK was overwhelmed with a flurry of contradicting suggestions. The four main guns were to be mounted in two barbettes covered with 2.5-inch-thick (64 mm) armoured cupolas. The choice of secondary armament caused another round of debate. The MTK initially proposed a combination of Russian Model 1877 6-inch guns and Armstrong 4.7-inch guns. Admirals Stepan Makarov and Vladimir Verkhovsky advised against the use of weapons of two different sizes (as this caused problems with fire control and direction), and against using the obsolete 1877 guns. The MTK did just the opposite, dropping the modern Armstrong guns in favor of the 1877 model, probably as a result of not wanting to use foreign-built weaponry. In March 1891 the MTK presented a revised proposal that increased displacement to 8,880 long tons (9,022 t) and the main armament to four 12-inch guns that was accepted by Admiral Chikachev.

== Description ==
The ship was 332 feet 6 inches (101.3 m) long at the waterline and 345 feet (105.2 m) long overall. She had a beam of 68 feet (20.7 m) and a draught of 25 feet 6 inches (7.8 m). She displaced 10,400 long tons (10,567 t), over 1,500 long tons (1,524 t) more than her designed displacement of 8,880 long tons (9,022 t). The ship had a partial double bottom and a centreline bulkhead separated the engine and boiler rooms. Sissoi Veliky's crew initially consisted of 27 officers and 555 enlisted men, but grew to a total of 686 by 1905.

Sissoi Veliky had two vertical triple-expansion steam engines, each driving one four-bladed propeller. They had a total designed output of 8,500 indicated horsepower (6,300 kW) using steam provided by 12 cylindrical fire-tube boilers. The ship's designed speed was 16 knots (30 km/h; 18 mph), but she reached a top speed of 15.65 knots (28.98 km/h; 18.01 mph) during her sea trials on October 17 [O.S. 5 October] 1896, despite 8,635 ihp (6,439 kW) from her engines. She carried a maximum of 1,000 long tons (1,016 t) of coal at full load that gave her a range of 4,440 nautical miles (8,220 km; 5,110 mi) at a speed of 10 knots (19 km/h; 12 mph).

=== Armament ===
Like many Russian ships before and after it, Sissoi Veliky was plagued by regular "improvements" of the original design that delayed construction for years. In the beginning of 1893, over a year after construction began, the MTK again redesigned Sissoi Veliky's artillery. The two pairs of 12-inch 40-calibre guns were changed from barbette mountings to French-style twin turrets. These guns had a maximum elevation of +15° and the ship carried 80 rounds per gun for them. Their rate of fire was intended to be one round per 1.5 minutes, but it was one shot per 2.5–3 minutes in reality. They fired a 731-pound (331.7 kg) shell at a muzzle velocity of 2,600 ft/s (792 m/s) to a range of 12,010 yards (10,980 m) at an elevation of +10°.

The secondary armament was replaced by a half-dozen 45-calibre quick-firing (QF) six-inch (152 mm) Canet guns that were mounted in casemates on the main deck. Each gun was provided with 200 rounds of ammunition. Alterations of the shell hoists to accommodate the larger rounds for the Canet guns began only in December 1895. They fired shells that weighed 91.4-pound (41.46 kg) with a muzzle velocity of 2,600 ft/s (792.5 m/s). They had a maximum range of 12,602 yards (11,523 m) when fired at an elevation of +20°.

The ship's anti-torpedo boat armament was changed more than once and, in the end, consisted of a dozen QF 47-millimetre (1.9 in) Hotchkiss guns and 10 Maxim QF 37-millimetre (1.5 in) guns. The 47 mm guns were mounted on the top of the superstructure and on the upper deck above the six-inch casemates. They fired a 3-pound-3-ounce (1.4 kg) shell at a muzzle velocity of 1,867 ft/s (569 m/s). The 37 mm guns were mounted in the fighting top. They fired a 1-pound (0.45 kg) shell at a muzzle velocity of 1,319 ft/s (402 m/s). Sissoi Veliky carried six above-water 15-inch (381 mm) torpedo tubes, one each in the bow and stern and two on each broadside. The ship also could carry 50 mines.

=== Armour ===
The ship's armour scheme was based on that of Navarin although it used nickel steel rather than the compound armour of the older ship. The maximum thickness of the waterline armour belt was 16 inches (406 mm) over the machinery spaces which reduced to 12 inches abreast the magazines. It covered 227 feet (69.2 m) of the ship's length and was 7 feet 2 inches (2.2 m) high. It tapered to a thickness of 6–8 inches (152–203 mm) at the bottom edge. The upper 3 feet 2 inches (1.0 m) of the belt was intended to be above the waterline, but the ship was significantly overweight and the entire belt was submerged at normal load. The belt terminated in 9-inch (229 mm) and 8-inch (203 mm) transverse bulkheads, fore and aft, respectively.

The casemate was above the belt, 5 inches (127 mm) thick on all sides, 152 feet (46.3 m) long and 7 feet 6 inches (2.3 m) high, and protected the six-inch guns. The sides of the turrets were 10 inches (254 mm) thick and their roofs were 2.5 inches (64 mm) thick. Above the casemate, the bases of the turrets were protected by 10 inches of armour; inside the casemate, only five inches of armour protected them. The conning tower's sides were nine inches thick. The armour deck connected to the top of the waterline belt and was 2.5 inches thick above the belt, but fore and aft of the belt it was 3 inches (76 mm) thick.

== Construction ==
The MTK rushed Gangut No. 2 into production and, contrary to established practice, ordered structural steel and armour before the project was properly authorized. Construction began on August 7 [O.S. July 25], 1891 in the wooden shed of the Franco-Russian Works in Saint Petersburg. On January 3 1892 [O.S. December 21, 1891] she was officially named Sissoi Veliky to commemorate the victory in the Battle of Hogland which coincided with the day of St. Sisoes the Great of Egypt in the Eastern Orthodox liturgical calendar. The ship was formally laid down on May 7 [O.S. May 19], 1892.

The management of the construction was flawed from the start: the stem and sternposts, rudder frame, and propeller shaft brackets were not ordered in time, and the late discovery of this omission substantially delayed progress. Verkhovsky, having no time to place orders with reliable foreign suppliers, contracted the job to local plants already known for poor discipline and quality that were already loaded down with other Navy jobs. (Note: In 1893–1895 Saint Petersburg yards were building five battleships and dozens of torpedo boat destroyers and gunboats.) The industrial capacity of the Saint Petersburg area could not sustain even the modest rate of naval rearmament that the government was willing to finance. In April 1893 minor grievances evolved in a full-scale conflict between Verkhovsky and the board of the Alexandrovsky Steel Works, a ridiculous charge of 25 roubles nearly brought the work to a full stop. The savvy admiral always blamed the suppliers but did not even attempt to fix the disarray in his own office.

Nevertheless, in April 1894 the completed hull passed static pressure tests. It was launched June 2 [O.S. May 20], 1894 during a fleet review attended by Tsar Nicholas II. The commissioning of Sissoi Veliky was scheduled for September 1896, but an examination in August revealed that the steering gear, water pumps, ventilation system and one of the turrets were still missing or defective. The builders hastily equipped the ship with rudder controls built for Poltava and delivered the ship for her sea trials on October 6 [O.S. September 23], 1896. The Navy desperately needed Sissoi Veliky in the Mediterranean and she was commissioned regardless of her known faults.

== Service ==
=== Mediterranean ===
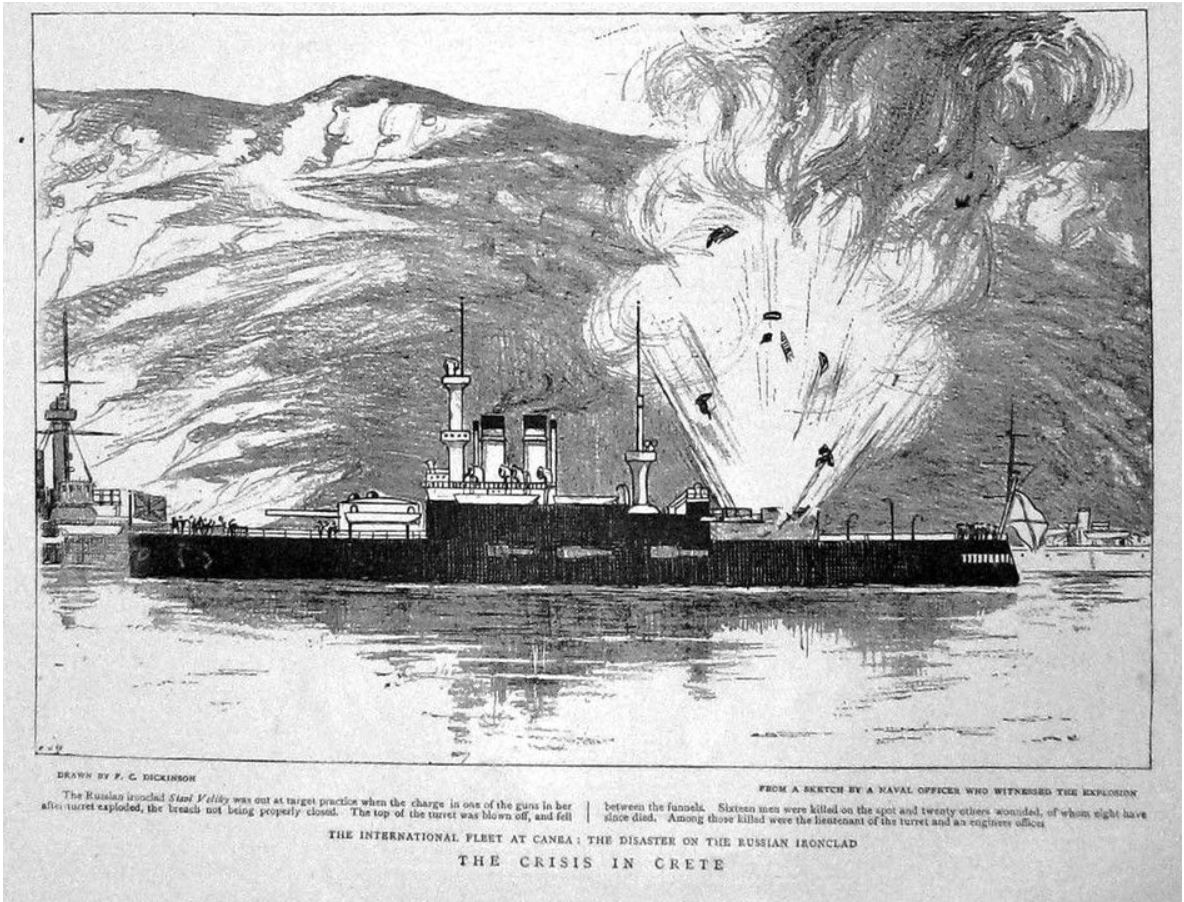
A drawing from the 27 March 1897 edition of The Graphic, showing the turret explosion

Immediately after the trials Sissoi Veliky was ordered to join the Mediterranean Squadron which was engaged in the naval blockade of Crete in the wake of the 1896 Cretan riots and the Hamidian massacres. Her maiden voyage revealed more problems; the lack of ventilation in the steering compartment was so appalling that during the first port call the captain purchased electric fans with his own money and the electrical systems failed one by one before reaching Gibraltar. The copper rings for sealing the portholes were left in Kronstadt and were not found until February 1897.

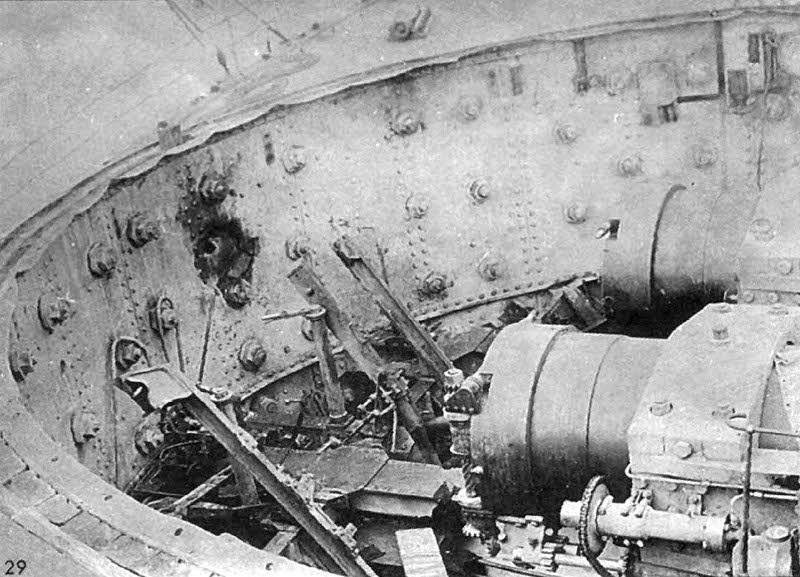
Explosion aftermath; interrupted screw breeches can be seen.

On December 27 [O.S. December 14], 1896 the leaking Sissoi Veliky reached Algiers. The captain planned to stay there for at least 20 days to complete the most urgent repairs, but five days later a telegram from Saint Petersburg forced him to leave for Piraeus. There the crew managed to seal the seams between the armour plates and repair the electrical systems. In February 1897 Sissoi Veliky steamed to Crete to join the International Squadron, a multinational naval force which intervened in a Greek uprising against the Ottoman Empire′s rule there. She had her first gunnery exercise ten miles off Souda Bay, Crete, at the end of February. In early March, she steamed with other ships of the squadron to Selino Kastelli on the southwest coast of Crete to put an international expedition ashore that rescued Ottoman troops and Cretan Turk civilians from Kandanos. After returning to the waters off Souda Bay, she conducted her second gunnery exercise, held on March 15 [O.S. March 3]. It ended in disaster when the rear turret exploded after an hour of target practice. The explosion blew the roof of the turret over the mainmast so that it struck the base of the foremast, crushing one 37 mm gun and a steam cutter. The explosion killed 16 men and wounded another 15; 6 of these later died of their wounds. The badly damaged Sissoi Veliky headed to Toulon for repairs.

Investigation revealed both mechanical and organizational causes of the accident. The chain of events, as it was reconstructed in Toulon, started with a failure of the hydraulic breech-locking mechanism of the left-hand gun. The turret crew then disabled the hydraulics and resorted to manual operation. The gunner responsible for closing and locking the breech failed to do so and the concussion of the right-hand gun firing unlocked it. The turret commander, ultimately responsible for checking the breech before firing, was too busy with calculating the firing solution and training the gun to be concerned with this matter. He delegated the checkup routine to an enlisted man, but this gunner had to attend his own station and was physically unable to look after the breech lock and attend to his own duties. The panel eventually dropped the charges against the captain and recommended introduction of mechanical fail-safe interlocks to prevent firing until the breech was properly locked.

Sissoi Veliky was repaired by Forges et Chantiers de la Méditerranée. The French engineers openly ridiculed the quality of Russian workmanship manifested in a 1.5-inch-wide (38 mm) open seam between the belt armour and the ship's hull. This could have completely negated the battleship's protection if a shell had struck it. The Russian investigators reported a horrifying number of less obvious faults and deemed the ship unfit for sailing. The internal decks of the secondary armament casemates were particularly dangerous since their 152 mm shells easily fell through the cracks and holes in the deck. The Saint Petersburg admirals dismissed these concerns, arguing that the gap between armour plates was an inevitable feature of the design, and that the decks and other faults could be fixed by the crew "in their spare time".

=== Far East ===
After nine months in the dock at Toulon, the repaired Sissoi Veliky was assigned to Admiral Fyodor Dubasov's Far Eastern Squadron (Navarin, Sissoi Veliky, and the armoured cruisers Rossia and Vladimir Monomakh) and sailed for the Far East. The British, alerted by the sudden movement of Russian battleships, dispatched the battleship HMS Victorious to shadow the Russian ship. Sissoi Veliky, assisted by a flotilla of tugs, barely passed the shallow entrance to the Suez Canal, but Victorious ran aground near Port Said and abandoned pursuit. Aside from this incident, the east-bound voyage was uneventful, and the ship safely reached Port Arthur on March 16 [O.S. March 4], 1898.

In the summer of 1898 Sissoi Veliky sailed to Nagasaki for repairs and returned to her new base in Vladivostok where she stayed for the rest of 1898 and 1899. In April 1900 the fleet sailed to Port Arthur for a massive landing exercise intended to intimidate the Boxers. The warning was not heeded, and the Boxer Rebellion intensified, compelling the Russian government to intervene. On May 28 [O.S. May 15], 1900 the Viceroy of the Russian Far East, Admiral Yevgeni Alekseyev, dispatched the Far Eastern Squadron from Port Arthur to the Taku Forts. Sissoi Veliky, the battleship Petropavlovsk, the armoured cruiser Dmitrii Donskoi and a host of other European ships blockaded the mouth of the Hai River and the smaller gunboats moved up the river to protect amphibious landings which began on May 29 [O.S. May 16]. The incursion provoked the Siege of the Beijing legations; the Russians responded by sending a company of sailors from Sissoi Veliky and Navarin to defend the embassy in Beijing.

The company reached the city without meeting any opposition and at first it seemed that the European troops in Beijing could easily defend the Embassy Row from the disorganized mob. On June 3 [O.S. May 21] the rebels received reinforcements from the regular Chinese Army and, on the afternoon of June 19 [O.S. June 6], they began a massive assault on the diplomatic missions. One month later the Chinese managed to burn down the Austrian, Dutch and Italian legations. The sailors stood their ground with American and French Marines until the arrival of reinforcements on August 5 [O.S. July 23]. During the seven weeks of the siege, three men from Sissoi Veliky were killed in action, one died of disease, and twelve were wounded.

Sissoi Veliky remained in the Far East for another year; in December 1901 an accumulation of mechanical troubles that could not be fixed in Far Eastern docks compelled the fleet commander to send her back to the Baltic. She returned to Libau via Nagasaki, Hong Kong and Suez in April 1902.

=== The last voyage ===
In May 1902 Sissoi Veliky attended a fleet review honouring the state visit of President of France, Émile Loubet. In June she was moved into a drydock in Kronstadt. All available financing was diverted to the completion of the Borodino-class battleship and the new cruisers, so the repairs of Sissoi Veliky proceeded at a slow pace. She had her artillery, boilers and ventilation system completely replaced, but once again it turned out that the repairs were not up to scratch and needed a thorough rework.

The Russo-Japanese War broke out in the Pacific on February 10 [O.S. January 27] 1904. In March the navy assigned Sissoi Veliky to the Second Pacific Squadron bound for the Pacific with Admiral Zinovy Rozhestvensky in command. Despite the urgency, calls to speed up repairs of Sissoi Veliky and completion of the new ships were stonewalled by the Ministry of the Navy until the shocking loss of Petropavlovsk on April 13 [O.S. March 31]. Admiral Aleksei Birilev, the new Governor of Kronstadt, hastened the repairs by striking out "unnecessary" jobs. Sissoi Veliky went into action with new rangefinders, searchlights and small-calibre guns, but her damaged internal decks were never mended. Manuil Ozerov, the captain of Sissoi Veliky, expressed concern about her stability, but on at least three occasions Birilev suppressed his reports, arguing that past experience is sufficient proof of the ship's seaworthiness.

On August 25 [O.S. August 13] the Second Pacific Squadron sailed from Saint Peterburg to Reval, where it wasted nearly a whole month in preparation for a fleet review. Tsar Nicholas II personally visited each battleship and harangued the crews in anticipation of a victory over Japan. On October 14 [O.S. October 2] the squadron departed Libau (having been delayed a day due to Sissoi Veliky losing her anchor), and sailed to Tangier. Here, Rozhestvensky split his forces. The newer battleships continued their way past the Cape of Good Hope and Rear Admiral Dmitry von Fölkersam's squadron of cruisers and transports were ordered to rendezvous with Black Sea Fleet ships in Souda Bay and then take the short route via the Suez Canal. Rozhestvensky initially planned to keep Sissoi Veliky and Navarin with his main force, but assigned them to Fölkersam instead. The ship rejoined Rozhestvesky's fleet at Nosy Be, Madagascar on January 9, 1905 [O.S. December 27, 1904] where they stayed for two months, training while Rozhestvensky finalized coaling arrangements for the next leg of the journey. Despite regular exercise, the gunners of the new Borodino-class ships could not match the level of Sissoi Veliky and other old ships. The squadron sailed for Camranh Bay, French Indochina, on March 16 [O.S. March 3] and reached it almost a month later to await the obsolete ships of the 3rd Pacific Squadron, commanded by Rear Admiral Nikolai Nebogatov. The latter ships reached Camranh Bay on May 9 [O.S. April 26] and the combined force sailed for Vladivostok five days later. The voyage from Madagascar to Camranh Bay took 28 days at an average speed of 7 knots (13 km/h; 8.1 mph), and again Sissoi Veliky's mechanical problems evidenced themselves, slowing down the squadron. In less than a month she suffered twelve failures of her boiler tubes and heat exchangers. The steering gear alone failed no less than four times.

=== Tsushima ===
May 14 [O.S. May 1], 1905 the squadron began the last leg of its journey to Tsushima. Sissoi Veliky was sailing in the left column of the Russian order of battle, second in line after Oslyabya. At 13:15 May 27 [O.S. May 14] the Russians sighted the Japanese fleet. Twenty-four minutes later Sissoi Veliky opened fire simultaneously with the flagship Knyaz Suvorov. Sissoi Veliky started firing at the armoured cruisers Kasuga and Nisshin and later engaged the armoured cruiser Iwate, hitting her with a single 12-inch shell.

At 14:40 a heavy shell exploded next to Sissoi Veliky's bow, damaging the bow torpedo tube. Shortly afterward a 12-inch and a 6-inch shell hit the belt armour near the water line, causing flooding in the forward compartments. In the following hour the ship was hit by one 12-inch, three 8-inch and three 6-inch shells, which disabled her forward turret hydraulics, set the casemates afire and simultaneously severed the firefighting water supply. At 15:40 Ozerov steered the burning Sissoi Veliky away from the line of fire and joined the unengaged Russian cruiser formation. By 17:00 the crew had extinguished the fires and the ship returned to action with a heavy list to port. She took her place in line behind Navarin at the moment when the Japanese battleships ceased fire and the Russians hoped to leave the battlefield without further casualties. One hour later Admiral Kamimura Hikonojō re-established contact and engaged the fleeing Russians. Sissoi Veliky survived this phase of the battle unharmed. After sunset she joined the group of survivors assembled by Nebogatov, but was unable to keep pace with Nebogatov's flagship Imperator Nikolai I. Sissoi Veliky and Navarin fell back, supporting Admiral Ushakov with gunfire. At 19:30 the ship sighted Japanese destroyers fanning out for an attack.

The destroyers attacked at close range (under 600 yards or 550 metres) in uncoordinated groups. Sissoi Veliky beat off the first (19:45) and the second (22:30) attacks, but the third one, by the Fourth Destroyer Flotilla under command of Kantarō Suzuki, which had already sunk Navarin and Knyaz Suvorov, scored a torpedo hit 45 minutes later that damaged her rudder and propellers. The ship could still be steered by using her engines at varying speeds, but the flooding intensified and by 03:15 the next morning the bow was submerged to the point where forward movement was no longer possible. Ozerov realized that Sissoi Veliky could not make it to Vladivostok; he ordered "all astern", reversed the engines and headed crabwise to Tsushima Island, hoping to beach his crippled ship with the intent of using her as a fixed gun emplacement.

By 06:00 flooding forced Ozerov to telegraph "all stop", shutting down the vessel's engines. The crippled Vladimir Monomakh passed by Sissoi Veliky, unable to offer any assistance. At 07:20 the Japanese armed merchant cruisers Shinano Maru and Dainan Maru converged on the stationary ship. When they came within 6,600 yards (6,000 m) of Sissoi Veliky, Ozerov signalled: "I am sinking, request assistance." The Japanese responded with a straightforward question, "Do you surrender?" Ozerov hoisted the white flag in response. At 08:15 the Japanese boarding party of one officer and 31 enlisted men boarded the battleship and raised the Japanese flag, but failed to pull down the Russian flag. The Japanese attempted to tow their prize to safety, but soon realized the effort was futile. They moved the Russian prisoners onto their ships and retrieved their flag. At 10:05 Sissoi Veliky capsized and sank, still flying the Russian flag. Sissoi Veliky lost 47 men killed during the battle; 613 of her crew were rescued.
