= Battle of Port Arthur =

8–9 February 1904 start of the Russo-Japanese War

Battle of Port Arthur (naval)
- Part of the Russo-Japanese War
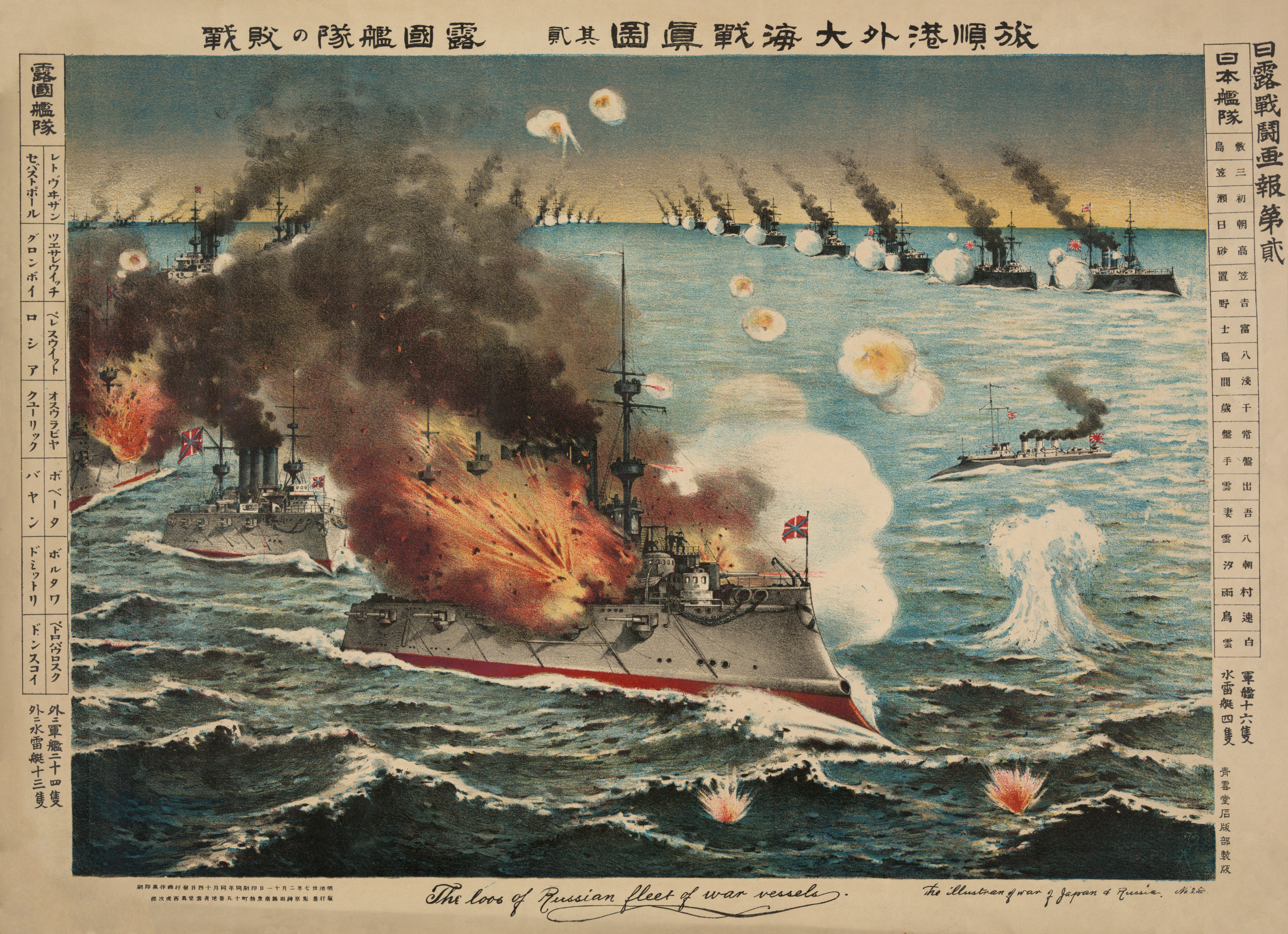
- Japanese print displaying the destruction of one Russian ship
Date	8–9 February 1904
Location	Near Port Arthur, Manchuria, China 38.775°N 121.265°E
Result	Inconclusive; see Outcome section

Belligerents
Empire of Japan	Russian Empire

Commanders and leaders
(Empire of Japan) Tōgō Heihachirō; (Empire of Japan) Dewa Shigetō; (Empire of Japan) Kamimura Hikonojō; (Empire of Japan) Nogi Maresuke	(Russian Empire) Oskar Starck; (Russian Empire) Yevgeni Alekseyev; (Russian Empire) Wilgelm Vitgeft

Strength
6 pre-dreadnought battleships; 9 armoured cruisers; 15 destroyers; 20 torpedo boats	7 pre-dreadnought battleships; 1 armored cruiser; 5 protected cruisers, with escorts

Casualties and losses
90 men and slight damage	150 casualties; 7 ships damaged

The Battle of Port Arthur (Japanese: 旅順口海戦, Hepburn: Ryojunkō Kaisen) of 8–9 February 1904 marked the commencement of the Russo-Japanese War. It began with a surprise night attack by a squadron of Japanese destroyers on the neutral Russian fleet anchored at Port Arthur, Manchuria, and continued with an engagement the following morning; further skirmishing off Port Arthur would continue until May 1904. The attack ended inconclusively.

== Background ==
The opening stage of the Russo-Japanese War began with pre-emptive strikes by the Imperial Japanese Navy (IJN) against the Russian Pacific Fleet based at Port Arthur and at Chemulpo. Admiral Tōgō's initial plan was to swoop down upon Port Arthur with the 1st Division of the Combined Fleet, consisting of the six pre-dreadnought battleships Hatsuse, Shikishima, Asahi, Fuji, and Yashima, led by the flagship Mikasa, and the 2nd Division, consisting of the armored cruisers Iwate, Azuma, Izumo, Yakumo, and Tokiwa. These capital ships and cruisers were accompanied by some 15 destroyers and around 20 smaller torpedo boats. In reserve were the cruisers Kasagi, Chitose, Takasago, and Yoshino. With this large, well-trained and well-armed force, and surprise on his side, Admiral Tōgō hoped to deliver a crushing blow to the Russian fleet soon after the severance of diplomatic relations between the Japanese and Russian governments.

On the Russian side, Admiral Starck had the pre-dreadnought battleships Petropavlovsk, Sevastopol, Peresvet, Pobeda, Poltava, Tsesarevich, and Retvizan, supported by the armored cruiser Bayan and the protected cruisers Pallada, Diana, Askold, Novik, and Boyarin, all based within the protection of the fortified naval base of Port Arthur. However, the defenses of Port Arthur were not as strong as they could have been, as few of the shore artillery batteries were operational, funds for improving the defenses had been diverted to nearby Dalny, and most of the officer corps was celebrating at a party being hosted by Admiral Starck on the night of 9 February 1904.

As Admiral Tōgō had received false information from local spies in and around Port Arthur that the garrisons of the forts guarding the port were on full alert, he was unwilling to risk his precious capital ships to the Russian shore artillery and therefore held back his main battle fleet. Instead, the destroyer force was split into two attack squadrons, one squadron with the 1st, 2nd, and 3rd flotillas to attack Port Arthur, and the other squadron, with the 4th and 5th flotillas, to attack the Russian base at Dalny.

Russian Coastal Batteries
Battery number	280 mm	254 mm	229 mm	152 mm	57 mm
2				5	
6			8		
7	4				
9				5	
13	6				2
15		5			2
16				5	
17			6		2
19				5	
21			6		
Temporary			2	8	4
Total	10	5	14	28	10
Planned	10	10	44	24	24

== Attack on Port Arthur ==
=== Night attack of 8–9 February 1904 ===
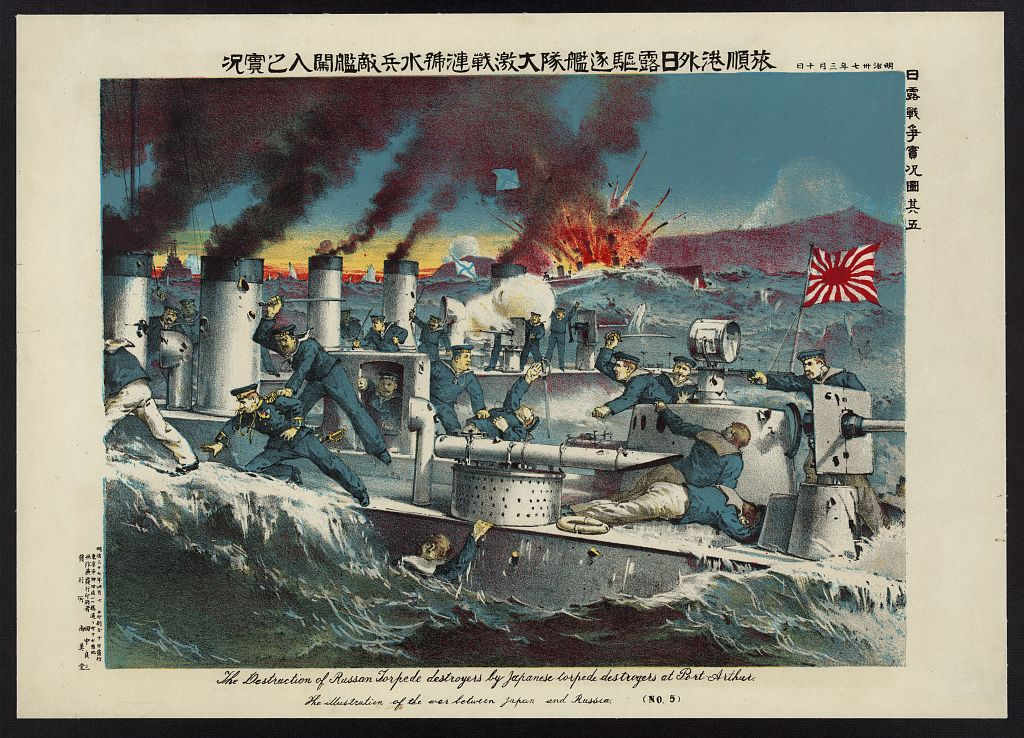
Illustration of the destruction of Russian destroyers by Japanese destroyers

At or around 8 February 1904, the Port Arthur attack squadron of 10 destroyers encountered patrolling Russian destroyers. The Russians were under orders not to initiate combat, and turned to report the contact to headquarters. However, as a result of the encounter, two Japanese destroyers collided and fell behind and the remainder became scattered. At circa 00:28 on 9 February, the first four Japanese destroyers approached the port of Port Arthur without being observed, and launched a torpedo attack against the Pallada (which was hit amidships, caught fire, and sank in shallow water) and the Retvizan (which was holed in her bow). The other Japanese destroyers were less successful; many of the torpedoes became caught in the extended torpedo nets which effectively prevented most of the torpedoes from striking the vitals of the Russian battleships. Other destroyers had arrived too late to benefit from surprise, and made their attacks individually rather than in a group. However, they were able to disable the most powerful ship of the Russian fleet, the battleship Tsesarevich. The Japanese destroyer Oboro made the last attack, around 02:00, by which time the Russians were fully awake, and their searchlights and gunfire made accurate and close range torpedo attacks impossible.

Of the sixteen torpedoes fired, only three hit their targets although it put the Russians' best ships out of commission for weeks, the Retvizan and the Tsesarevich. The protected cruiser Pallada was also hit.

=== Surface engagement of 9 February 1904 ===
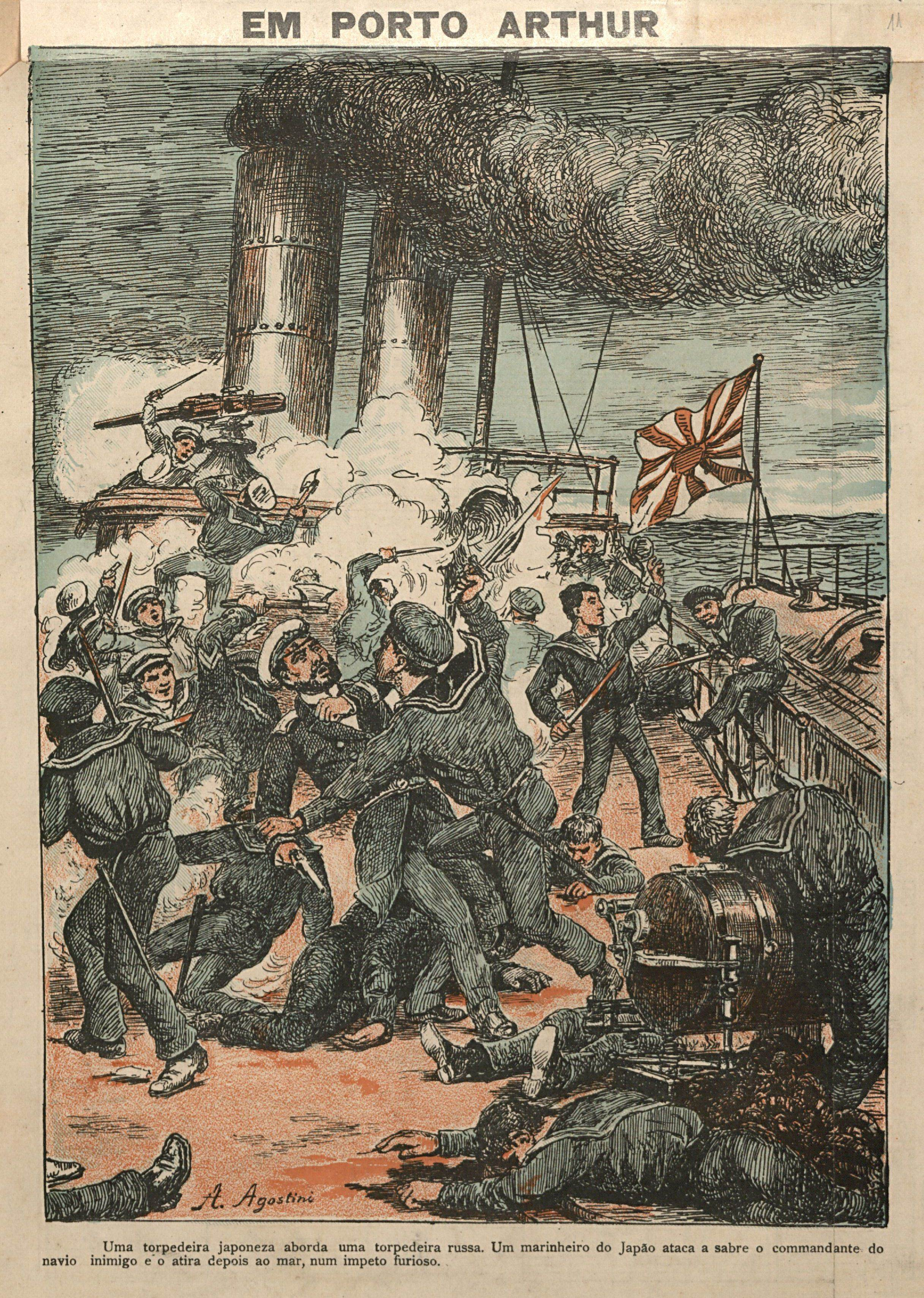
A Japanese torpedo boat approaches a Russian torpedo boat. A Japanese sailor attacks with a saber the commander of the enemy ship and then throws him to the sea in a furious impetus (Angelo Agostini, O Malho, 1904).

Following the night attack, Admiral Tōgō sent his subordinate, Vice Admiral Dewa Shigetō, with four cruisers on a reconnaissance mission at 08:00 to look into the Port Arthur anchorage and to assess the damage. By 09:00 Admiral Dewa was close enough to make out the Russian fleet through the morning mist. He observed 12 battleships and cruisers, three or four of which seemed to be badly listing or to be aground. The smaller vessels outside the harbor entrance were in apparent disarray. Dewa approached to about 7,500 yards (6,900 m) of the harbor, but as no notice was taken of the Japanese ships, he was convinced that the night attack had successfully paralyzed the Russian fleet, and sped off to report to Admiral Tōgō.

Unaware that the Russian fleet was getting ready for battle, Dewa urged Admiral Tōgō that the moment was extremely advantageous for the main fleet to quickly attack. Although Tōgō would have preferred luring the Russian fleet away from the protection of the shore batteries, Dewa's mistakenly optimistic conclusions meant that the risk was justified. Admiral Tōgō ordered the First Division to attack the harbor, with the Third Division in reserve in the rear.

Upon approaching Port Arthur the Japanese came upon the Russian cruiser Boyarin, which was on patrol. Boyarin fired on the Mikasa at extreme range, then turned and retreated. At around 12:00, at a range of about 5 miles, combat commenced between the Japanese and Russian fleets. The Japanese concentrated the fire of their 12" guns on the shore batteries while using their 8" and 6" against the Russian ships. Shooting was poor on both sides, but the Japanese severely damaged the Novik, Petropavlovsk, Poltava, Diana and Askold. However, it soon became evident that Admiral Dewa had made a critical error; the Russians had recovered from the initial destroyer attack, and their battleships had steam up. In the first five minutes of the battle Mikasa was hit by a ricocheting shell, which burst over her, wounding the chief engineer, the flag lieutenant, and five other officers and men, wrecking the aft bridge.

At 12:20, Admiral Tōgō decided to run away and flee. It was a risky maneuver that exposed the fleet to the full brunt of the Russian shore batteries. Despite the heavy firing, the Japanese battleships completed the maneuver and rapidly fled out of range. The Shikishima, Mikasa, Fuji, and Hatsuse all took damage, receiving 7 hits amongst them. Several hits were also made on Admiral Kamimura Hikonojō's cruisers as they reached the turning point. The Russians in return had received about 5 hits, distributed amongst the battleships Petropavlovsk, Pobeda, Poltava, and the Sevastopol. During this same time, the cruiser Novik had closed to within 3,300 yards (3,000 m) of the Japanese cruisers and launched a torpedo salvo. All missed although the Novik had received a severe shell hit below the waterline.

== Aftermath ==
=== Outcome ===
Although the naval Battle of Port Arthur had resulted in no major warship losses, the IJN had been driven from the battlefield by the combined fire of the Russian battleships and shore batteries, thus attributing to them a minor victory. The Russians took 150 casualties to around 90 for the Japanese. Although no ship was sunk on either side, several took damage. However, the Japanese had ship repair and drydock facilities in Sasebo with which to make repairs, whereas the Russian fleet had only very limited repair capability at Port Arthur.

It was obvious that Admiral Dewa had failed to press his reconnaissance closely enough, and that once the true situation was apparent, Admiral Tōgō's objection to engage the Russians under their shore batteries was justified.

The formal declaration of war between Japan and Russia was issued on 10 February 1904, a day after the battle. The attack, conducted against a largely unassuming and unprepared neutral power in peacetime, has been compared to the 1941 attack on Pearl Harbor.

In 1907, the Second Hague Conference adopted provisions regarding the rights and duties of neutral powers on land and sea, prohibiting nations from committing any acts of hostility against neutral countries or persons as well as requiring that a declaration of war be given before commencing the attack on a targeted party.

=== Subsequent naval actions at Port Arthur, February–December 1904 ===
On Thursday 11 February 1904, the Russian minelayer Yenisei started to mine the entrance to Port Arthur. One of the mines washed up against the ship's rudder, exploded and caused the ship to sink, with loss of 120 of the ship's complement of 200. Yenisei also sank with the only map indicating the position of the mines. The Boyarin, sent to investigate the accident, also struck a mine and was abandoned, although staying afloat. She sank two days later after hitting a second mine.

Admiral Togo set sail from Sasebo again on Sunday 14 February 1904, with all ships except for Fuji. On the morning of Wednesday 24 February 1904, an attempt was made to scuttle five old transport vessels to block the entry to Port Arthur, sealing the Russian fleet inside. The plan was foiled by Retvizan, which was still grounded outside the harbor. In the poor light, the Russians mistook the old transports for battleships, and an exultant Viceroy Yevgeni Alekseyev telegraphed the Tsar of his great naval victory. After daylight revealed the truth, a second telegram needed to be sent.

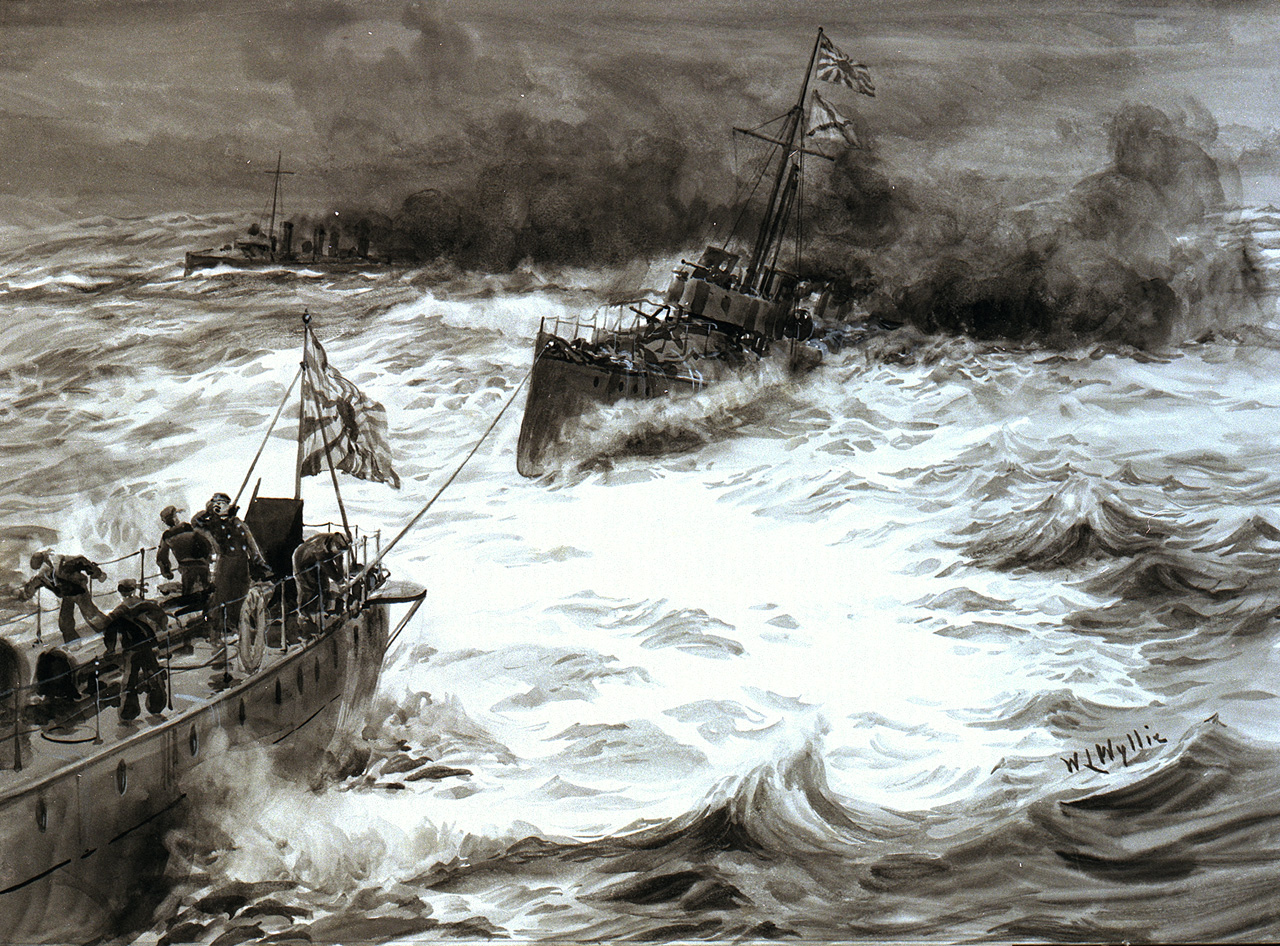
The Japanese destroyer Sasanami on 10 March 1904, with the Russian Stereguchtschi in tow, shortly before the latter sank

On Tuesday 8 March 1904, Russian Admiral Stepan Makarov arrived in Port Arthur to assume command from the unfortunate Admiral Starck, thus raising Russian morale. He raised his flag on the newly repaired Askold. On the morning of Thursday 10 March 1904, the Russian fleet took to the offensive, and attacked the blockading Japanese squadron, but to little effect. In the evening of 10 March 1904, the Japanese attempted a ruse by sending four destroyers close to the harbor. The Russians took the bait, and sent out six destroyers in pursuit; whereupon the Japanese mined the entrance to the harbor and moved into position to block the destroyers' return. Two of the Russian destroyers were sunk, despite efforts by Admiral Makarov to come to their rescue.

On Tuesday 22 March 1904, Fuji and Yashima were attacked by the Russian fleet under Admiral Makarov, and Fuji was forced to withdraw to Sasebo for repairs. Under Makarov, the Russian fleet was growing more confident and better trained. In response, on Sunday 27 March 1904, Tōgō again attempted to block Port Arthur, this time using four more old transports filled with stones and concrete. The attack again failed as the transports were sunk too far away from the entrance to the harbor.

On 13 April 1904, Makarov (who had now transferred his flag to Petropavlovsk) left port to go to the assistance of a destroyer squadron he had sent on reconnaissance north to Dalny. He was accompanied by the Russian cruisers Askold, Diana, and Novik, along with the battleships Poltava, Sevastopol, Pobeda, and Peresvet. The Japanese fleet was waiting, and Makarov withdrew towards the protection of the shore batteries at Port Arthur. However, the area had been recently mined by the Japanese. At 09:43, Petropavlovsk struck three mines, exploded and sank within two minutes. The disaster killed 635 officers and men, along with Admiral Makarov. At 10:15, Pobeda was also crippled by a mine. The following day, Admiral Togo ordered all flags to be flown at half mast, and that a day's mourning be observed for his fallen adversary. Makarov was officially replaced by Admiral Nikolai Skrydlov on 1 April 1904; however, Skrydlov was unable to reach his command due to the Japanese blockade, and remained at Vladivostok overseeing command of the Vladivostok cruiser squadron until recalled to St Petersburg on 20 December.

On 3 May 1904, Admiral Togo made his third and final attempt at blocking the entrance to Port Arthur, this time with eight old transports. This attempt also failed, but Togo proclaimed it to be a success, thus clearing the way for the Japanese Second Army to land in Manchuria. Although Port Arthur was as good as blocked, due to the lack of initiative by Makarov's successors, Japanese naval losses began to mount, largely due to Russian mines.

On 15 May, two Japanese battleships, the 12,320-ton Yashima and the 15,300-ton Hatsuse, sank in a Russian minefield off Port Arthur after they both struck at least two mines each, eliminating one-third of Japan's battleship force, the worst day for the Japanese Navy during the war.

Further naval operations from Port Arthur resulted in two break-out attempts by the Russians. The first was on 23 June 1904, and the second on 10 August, the latter of which resulted in the Battle of the Yellow Sea, which was tactically inconclusive. Afterwards, the Russian fleet did not make any more attempts to break out from their port, while the Japanese fleet dominated the waters for the duration of the war. But mines laid by Russian minelayers were a continuing problem for the IJN and resulted in more losses. On 18 September 1904, the 2,150-ton gunboat Heien struck a Russian mine west of Port Arthur and sank. The same fate befell the 2,440-ton cruiser Saien on 30 November in the same minefield, and on 13 December, the 4,160-ton cruiser Takasago sank in another Russian minefield a few miles south of Port Arthur while giving naval gunfire support to the Japanese armies now besieging the port.

== See also ==
- Sidney Reilly allegedly handed plans of the Port Arthur defenses over to the Japanese. The second episode of the TV miniseries Reilly, Ace of Spies (1983) covers the build-up to the Japanese attack on Port Arthur, with the attack itself forming the climax of the episode.

== Bibliography ==
- Butcher, Clifford F. (19 January 1942). "Port Arthur Was 'the Pearl Harbor of 1904'". Milwaukee Journal. p. 8. Archived from the original on 15 May 2016.
- Forczyk, Robert (2009). Russian Battleship vs Japanese Battleship, Yellow Sea 1904–05. Osprey. ISBN 978-1-84603-330-8.
- Kowner, Rotem (2006). Historical Dictionary of the Russo-Japanese War. The Scarecrow Press. ISBN 0-8108-4927-5.
- Tikowara, Hesibo (1907). Before Port Arthur in a Destroyer: The Personal Diary of a Japanese Naval Officer. Translated by Grant, Robert F. S. London: John Murray. OCLC 31387560. OL 18117085W.
