= Oskar Starck =

Finland-Swedish explorer and admiral in the Imperial Russian Navy (1846–1928)

Oskar Ludvig Starck
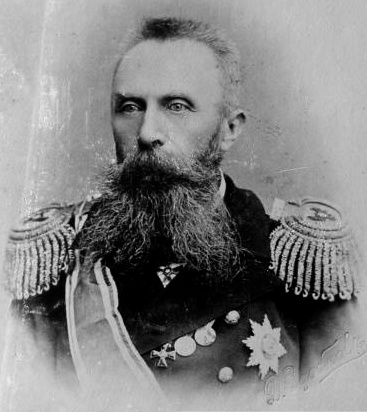
- Vice-admiral Oskar Starck.
- Born: 16 August 1846; Helsinki, Grand Duchy of Finland, Russian Empire
- Died: 13 November 1928 (aged 82); Helsinki, Finland
- Military career
- Allegiance: Russian Empire
- Branch: Imperial Russian Navy
- Rank: Admiral
- Conflicts: Russo-Turkish War; Russo-Japanese War; World War I Russian Civil War
- Awards: Order of St Vladimir, 2nd degree

Oskar Ludvig Starck (Russian: Оскар Викторович (Фёдорович) Старк, Oskar Viktorovich (Fyodorovich) Stark; 16 August 1846 – 13 November 1928) was a Finland-Swedish admiral in the Imperial Russian Navy and a noted explorer of Peter the Great Gulf and the Far Eastern seas. A strait in Peter the Great Gulf and a bay in the Tatar Strait are named after him.

== Biography ==
Starck was born in Helsinki (Helsingfors) in the Grand Duchy of Finland and was of Scottish descent, Finland-Swedish ethnicity and Lutheran faith. He graduated from the Sea Cadet Corps in 1864. In his early career, he participated on numerous expeditions as commander of the frigate Vostok from 1874–1877 to chart the Arctic and Pacific coasts of Siberia. He subsequently captained a gunboat in the Russo-Turkish War (1877–1878) and later the gunboats Sivuch and Pervenets. He was captain of the cruiser Vladimir Monomakh from 1891–1892. From 11 April 1898 to 7 October 1902 Starck served in the Russian Pacific Fleet. On 6 December 1902, he was promoted to vice admiral. By appointment from Viceroy of the Russian Far East Yevgeni Ivanovich Alekseyev, Starck was commander of the Russian naval base at Port Arthur from 1 May 1898 to 7 October 1902. In February 1902 he was appointed commander of the Russian Pacific Fleet.

At the start of the Russian-Japanese War, the Imperial Japanese Navy launched a pre-emptive strike on the Russian fleet anchored at Port Arthur, initiating the Battle of Port Arthur. At the time of the attack, Starck was holding a birthday party for his wife on the deck of his flagship, the battleship Petropavlovsk, and the crowd attending the party mistakenly thought the exploding Japanese ordnance was fired in honour of the birthday party.

The Japanese attack was less-than-entirely successful, and Starck (despite wanting to engage the Japanese and being overruled by the Viceroy) was loudly criticized in the Russian and the world press as having suffered a huge defeat, and was subsequently sacked by Tsar Nicholas II from his post on 24 February 1904. Vice Admiral Stepan Makarov arrived on 8 March 1904 as his replacement. Starck was given the Order of St. Vladimir and recalled to a staff assignment with the Russian Black Sea Fleet in 1906, but continued to be regarded as a scapegoat for the Battle of Port Arthur.

After the war, Starck was discharged from the military in 1908 and became involved in business activities. For a time he was Chairman of the Board of the Obukhov State Plant and the Izhorskiye Zavody.

After the October Revolution, Starck went into exile to Helsinki, Finland, where he died in 1928.

== Sources ==
- Biography Center
