= List of shipwrecks in 1904 =

The list of shipwrecks in 1904 includes ships sunk, foundered, grounded, or otherwise lost during 1904.

table of contents
1904
Jan	Feb	Mar	Apr
May	Jun	Jul	Aug
Sep	Oct	Nov	Dec
Unknown date

== January ==
=== 4 January ===
List of shipwrecks: 4 January 1904
Ship	State	Description
Vernia	United States	While the 6-gross register ton 28-foot (8.5 m) sloop, carrying a cargo of 4,000 pounds (1,800 kg) of fish and fishing gear and a crew of two, was transiting Lynn Canal in the District of Alaska in darkness during a voyage from Juneau to Hunter Bay, a squall struck which blew her onto a rock. The rock holed her, and she flooded, sank, and was battered to pieces on rocks. Her crew survived.

=== 5 January ===
List of shipwrecks: 5 January 1904
Ship	State	Description
Connasauga	United States	The packet struck a snag and sank in the Coosa River near Gadsden, Alabama. Raised and repaired.

=== 7 January ===
List of shipwrecks: 7 January 1904
Ship	State	Description
Fauvette	France	The schooner sank just north of the Chausey Islands in the Channel Islands.

=== 9 January ===
List of shipwrecks: 9 January 1904
Ship	State	Description
Clallam	Canada	The steamer sprung a leak in a storm, plus had a broken porthole, causing her to fill, capsize and sink between Port Townsend, Washington and Victoria, British Columbia. 40 passengers and 10 crewmen were killed. 22 crewmen and 9 passengers were rescued by Sea Lion (flag unknown).
John H. Starin	United States	The steamer struck a submerged wreck two miles (3.2 km) south east of Bridgeport Light. She was brought into Bridgeport, Connecticut and beached.

=== 16 January ===
List of shipwrecks: 16 January 1904
Ship	State	Description
John L. Brady	United States	The packet struck a snag and sank in the Coosa River near Gadsden, Alabama. Raised and repaired.

=== 18 January ===
List of shipwrecks: 18 January 1904
Ship	State	Description
Yvonne	United States	The schooner was sunk in a collision with Vaquero (United States) in the Red Fish Channel. Total loss. The crew were rescued by boats from Vaquero.

=== 19 January ===
List of shipwrecks: 19 January 1904
Ship	State	Description
Avenger	Norway	The full-rigged sailing ship was wrecked in the Chandeleur Islands. Refloated in 1917 and rebuilt as a bark and put in service as John H. Kirby (United States).

=== 22 January ===
List of shipwrecks: 22 January 1904
Ship	State	Description
Alcedo	United States	The steamer was sunk by ice near New Geneva, Pennsylvania.
Barge No. 3	United States	The barge sank in a collision with Barge No. 1 while anchored in Bayou St. John, Louisiana, during a storm. One crewman from each barge was killed.
Hornet No. 2	United States	The steamer sunk by ice at Paden City, West Virginia.
Schouwen II	Netherlands	Schouwen II The schooner was driven ashore at Zandvoort, North Holland.
T. M. Bayne	United States	The steamer sunk by ice at Paden City, West Virginia or Steubenville, Ohio.

=== 23 January ===
List of shipwrecks: 23 January 1904
Ship	State	Description
Lizzie Townsend	United States	The steamer burned to the waterline at Wheeling, West Virginia.
May	United States	The steamer was crushed by ice in the Schuylkill River at the Walnut Street Wharf, Philadelphia, Pennsylvania.

=== 24 January ===
List of shipwrecks: 24 January 1904
Ship	State	Description
Cascade	United States	The tug was sunk by ice one-half mile (0.80 km) off Lorain, Ohio.
Elizabeth	United States	The laid up steamer was set on fire in the Allegheny River above the Sixth Street Bridge at Pittsburgh, Pennsylvania, when Olivette (United States), that she was tied up along side, caught fire. She was cut loose drifting down to the wooden Union Bridge setting it on fire also. She was then beached by a tug and burned out.
John K.	United States	The steamer was destroyed by fire at Indian Village in Bayou Plaquemine.
Olivette	United States	The laid up steamer was destroyed by fire in the Allegheny River above the Sixth Street Bridge at Pittsburgh, Pennsylvania, setting Elizabeth (United States), tied up along side, on fire also.

=== 25 January ===
List of shipwrecks: 25 January 1904
Ship	State	Description
Alice	United States	The packet struck a snag and sank in the Pascagoula River. Raised and repaired.
B. F. Bennett	United States	The ferry was sunk by ice at the mouth of the Cioto River. Total loss.
Unknown canal boat	United States	A canal boat was sunk in a collision between Stella Moren and Clyde (both United States), probably under tow by one of them, above Lock No. 4 in the Monongahela River.

=== 26 January ===
List of shipwrecks: 26 January 1904
Ship	State	Description
Adelle	United States	The steamer was sunk at dock by ice at Coal Haven, Kentucky. Total loss. Her master and two crewmen killed.
Unidentified barges	United States	Eight barges, under tow of E. Luckenbach (United States), foundered in a heavy storm 0.5 nautical miles (0.9 km; 0.6 mi) west of the Penfield Reef Light.

=== 28 January ===
List of shipwrecks: 28 January 1904
Ship	State	Description
Maryland	United States	The barge was wrecked after losing her towline to John L. Brady (United States) in a gale in the Galveston, Texas, area.
Sunbeam	United Kingdom	The schooner went ashore in ballast on Rossbeigh Strand, Castlemaine harbour, County Kerry, Ireland . The surviving wreck was cast further up the beach in January 2014.

=== 29 January ===
List of shipwrecks: 29 January 1904
Ship	State	Description
Columbia	United States	The laid-up steamer sank at dock at Cramp's Wharf in Philadelphia, Pennsylvania. She probably got caught under the pier on a rising tide, filled up, and sank.
Geo. M. Winslow	United States	During a snowstorm, the 112-foot (34 m), 197-gross register ton tow steamer was wrecked on the southwest end of Sow and Pigs Reef off Cuttyhunk Island, Massachusetts. She broke up and sank in up to 50 feet (15 m) of water at 41°23.903′N 070°58.592′W and was declared a total loss.

=== 30 January ===
List of shipwrecks: 30 January 1904
Ship	State	Description
Bellevue	United States	The steamer was sunk by ice at Louisville, Kentucky. Later raised.

== February ==
=== 1 February ===
List of shipwrecks: 1 February 1904
Ship	State	Description
Twilight	United States	The tow steamer was driven on to rocks in Little Hell Gate in the East River by a squall and sank.

=== 2 February ===
List of shipwrecks: 2 February 1904
Ship	State	Description
Atlas	United States	The steamer was holed and sunk by ice at dock in Thompsons Point, New Jersey.
Wasp	United States	The barge, under tow of Minnie (United States), sprang a leak and sank off Winter Quarter in a gale with heavy seas.

=== 3 February ===
List of shipwrecks: 3 February 1904
Ship	State	Description
Ethel	United States	The steamer struck a snag in the Savannah River near Augusta, Georgia, and sank.
Puritan	United States	The barge sprang a leak and sank 6 nautical miles (11 km; 6.9 mi) south of Cape Henlopen, Delaware, in a gale with heavy seas.

=== 6 February ===
List of shipwrecks: 6 February 1904
Ship	State	Description
Pere Marquette 19	United States	The car ferry ran aground on Fox Point, Wisconsin, or one mile (1.6 km) north of it, in Lake Michigan in dense fog and heavy ice. Refloated on 19 February, almost declared a total loss.
Robert V. Rider	United States	The 10-gross register ton sloop burned at Jones Bay, North Carolina. All three people on board survived.

=== 8 February ===
List of shipwrecks: 8 February 1904
Ship	State	Description
Eilene	United States	The laid-up steamer was sunk at dock by ice in the Licking River at Newport, Kentucky. Raised and repaired.
Tremont	United States	The steamer burned to the waterline and sank at Pier 35 in the East River, a total loss. Wreckage was removed by a wrecking company. One crewman killed.

=== 9 February ===
List of shipwrecks: 9 February 1904
Ship	State	Description
Dora Retzlaff	Germany	The cargo ship, owned by Reederei Emil R. Retzlaff., foundered 66 nautical miles (122 km) north east of Cape Vilano.
Korietz	Imperial Russian Navy	Korietz exploding at Chemulpo Russo-Japanese War: After suffering damage in the Battle of Chemulpo Bay, the Korietz-class gunboat was blown up by detonation of her ammunition magazines at Chemulpo, Korea, to avoid capture by the Japanese.
Madalene Cooney	United States	The schooner's bow was holed by ice off Wilmington Creek, Delaware in the Delaware River and was beached.
Retvizan	Imperial Russian Navy	Russo-Japanese War, Battle of Port Arthur: After a torpedo fired by an Imperial Japanese Navy destroyer struck her while she was anchored in the outer harbor at Port Arthur, Manchuria, China, the Retvizan-class battleship got underway and ran aground in the narrow channel between the outer and inner harbors while trying to steam into the inner harbor. Five members of her crew died in the torpedo explosion. She was refloated on 8 March and moved into the inner harbor, where repairs were completed on 3 June.
Startle	United States	The 19-gross register ton sloop sank off Newport, Rhode Island. All eight people on board survived.
Tsesarevich	Imperial Russian Navy	Russo-Japanese War, Battle of Port Arthur: After a torpedo fired by an Imperial Japanese Navy destroyer struck her while she was anchored in the outer harbor at Port Arthur, Manchuria, China, the Tsesarevich-class battleship got underway and steamed into the narrow channel into the inner harbor, where tugs took her in tow, but she ran aground in the channel before reaching the inner harbor. One member of her crew died as a result of the torpedo hit. She was refloated and moved into the inner harbor, where repairs were completed on 7 June.
Varyag	Imperial Russian Navy	Varyag after salvage by Japanese. Russo-Japanese War: After suffering damage in the Battle of Chemulpo Bay, the Varyag-class protected cruiser was scuttled at Chemulpo, Korea, to avoid capture by the Japanese. The Japanese later salvaged her and placed her in service as the protected cruiser Soya (Imperial Japanese Navy).

=== 11 February ===
List of shipwrecks: 11 February 1904
Ship	State	Description
Fulton	United States	The steamer dragged anchor and beached in a heavy gale at Port Orford, Oregon. One crewman was killed by falling deck cargo.
Yenisey	Imperial Russian Navy	Russo-Japanese War: The minelayer exploded and sank in Dalian Bay off Dalniy, Manchuria, China, after striking one of her own mines. Her commanding officer refused to leave her and went down with the ship.

=== 12 February ===
List of shipwrecks: 12 February 1904
Ship	State	Description
Boyarin	Imperial Russian Navy	Russo-Japanese War: The Boyarin-class protected cruiser struck a mine in Dalian Bay off Dalniy, Manchuria, China, on 11 February, killing ten crewmen, and was abandoned immediately. When she did not sink, her commanding officer ordered a destroyer to torpedo her, reaffirming the order twice when the destroyer′s commanding officer questioned scuttling a ship that was not in obvious danger of sinking. Both torpedoes fired at her missed, and she was left to drift as a derelict. Imperial Japanese Navy destroyers found her still afloat on 12 February and boarded her to remove some of her gear, again leaving her to drift unmanned in the bay. She finally sank in a storm on the evening of 12 February. An Imperial Russian Navy court of inquiry into her loss later found her commanding officer′s conduct in abandoning his ship so quickly and making no effort to save her despite her apparent continued seaworthiness to have been "irregular."
Gertrude	United States	The steamer struck rocks at Middle Francis Bend in the Chattahoochee River and sank in six feet (1.8 m) of water. Raised immediately.
Juniata	United States	The steamer was sunk by ice at Madison, Indiana, a total loss.
Nagonoura Maru (or Nakanoura Maru)	Japan	1904 Japanese illustration "Sinking of the Nakanoura Maru." Russo-Japanese War: During a voyage to Otaru, Japan, the 1,804-ton merchant ship was sunk by gunfire in the Sea of Japan off the Tsugaru Strait by a cruiser squadron consisting of the armored cruisers Gromoboi, Rossia, and Rurik and the protected cruiser Bogatyr (all Imperial Russian Navy).
Ruby Schultz	Belgium	The steamship was wrecked three nautical miles (5.6 km) north west of Flamborough Head, Yorkshire, United Kingdom.

=== 14 February ===
List of shipwrecks: 14 February 1904
Ship	State	Description
Eagle	United States	The steamer was sunk by ice at Norwalk, Connecticut.

=== 21 February ===
List of shipwrecks: 21 February 1904
Ship	State	Description
Jim Brown	United States	The steamer filled with water and sank at dock at Glenwood Landing. Raised, repaired and returned to service by early April.

=== 22 February ===
List of shipwrecks: 22 February 1904
Ship	State	Description
Thomas McNally	United States	The canal boat was sunk in a collision with Baltimore (United States) off Seventeenth Street, New York City in thick fog.

=== 23 February ===
List of shipwrecks: 23 February 1904
Ship	State	Description
Bushu Maru	Imperial Japanese Navy	Russo-Japanese War: Approaching the harbor at Port Arthur, Manchuria, China, to be sunk as a blockship in the entrance, the 1,249-gross register ton transport was sunk with a scuttling charge outside the entrance by her crew, which had become disoriented by the glare of Russian searchlights and believed they had reached the entrance and that the blockship Jinsen Maru had scuttled herself up at the planned location and that they were in the correct scuttling place relative to Jinsen Maru's position. Sources differ as to casualties and the rescue of the crews of the five blockships. Casualties among the five blockships combined either was one killed or three wounded. Either each blockship crew was rescued by its ship's designated escort/rescue vessel. – Bushu Maru's was the torpedo boat Tsubami (Imperial Japanese Navy) – or the designated escort/rescue vessels rescued three of the blockship crews and the other two crews escaped in their ship's boats.
Buyo Maru	Imperial Japanese Navy	Russo-Japanese War: Approaching the harbor at Port Arthur, Manchuria, China, to be sunk as a blockship in the entrance, the 1,153-gross register ton transport was sunk with a scuttling charge outside the entrance by her crew, which had become disoriented by the glare of Russian searchlights and believed they had reached the entrance and that the blockship Jinsen Maru had scuttled herself up at the planned location and that they were in the correct scuttling place relative to Jinsen Maru's position. Sources differ as to casualties and the rescue of the crews of the five blockships. Casualties among the five blockships combined either was one killed or three wounded. Either each blockship crew was rescued by its ship's designated escort/rescue vessel. – Buyo Maru's was the torpedo boat Manazuru (Imperial Japanese Navy) – or the designated escort/rescue vessels rescued three of the blockship crews and the other two crews escaped in their ship's boats.
Hokoku Maru	Imperial Japanese Navy	Russo-Japanese War: Approaching the harbor at Port Arthur, Manchuria, China, to be sunk as a blockship in the entrance, the 2,776-gross register ton transport came under fire by the stranded battleship Retvizan (Imperial Russian Navy). Retvizan's gunfire disabled her steering gear, cut the detonator wires to her scuttling charge, and set her on fire, and she ran aground just outside the west end of the harbor entrance. Her crew abandoned her, leaving her in flames. Sources differ as to casualties and the rescue of the crews of the five blockships. Casualties among the five blockships combined either was one killed or three wounded. Either each blockship crew was rescued by its ship's designated escort/rescue vessel. – Hokoku Maru's was the torpedo boat Hayabusa (Imperial Japanese Navy) – or the designated escort/rescue vessels rescued three of the blockship crews and the other two crews escaped in their ship's boats.
Jinsen Maru	Imperial Japanese Navy	Russo-Japanese War: Approaching the harbor at Port Arthur, Manchuria, China, to be sunk as a blockship in the entrance, the 2,331-gross register ton transport ran hard aground on a rock outside the entrance. Her crew sank her with a scuttling charge and abandoned her. Sources differ as to casualties and the rescue of the crews of the five blockships. Casualties among the five blockships combined either was one killed or three wounded. Either each blockship crew was rescued by its ship's designated escort/rescue vessel. – Jinsen Maru's was the torpedo boat Kasasagi (Imperial Japanese Navy) – or the designated escort/rescue vessels rescued three of the blockship crews and the other two crews escaped in their ship's boats.
Mary and Ida	United States	The 174-net register ton, 110.2-foot (33.6 m) cod-fishing schooner dragged her anchor during a gale and was wrecked at Unga Island in the Shumagin Islands off the south coast of the Alaska Peninsula. Her entire crew of eight survived.
Tenshu Maru	Imperial Japanese Navy	Russo-Japanese War: Steaming toward Port Arthur, Manchuria, China, to be sunk as a blockship in the entrance to the harbor there, the 2,943-gross register ton transport ran aground and was wrecked 3 miles (4.8 km) from the entrance. Casualties among the five blockships combined either was one killed or three wounded. Either each blockship crew was rescued by its ship's designated escort/rescue vessel. – Tenshu Maru's was the torpedo boat Chidori (Imperial Japanese Navy) – or the designated escort/rescue vessels rescued three of the blockship crews and the other two crews escaped in their ship's boats.

=== 24 February ===
List of shipwrecks: 24 February 1904
Ship	State	Description
Eliza	United States	The steamer was pushed by ice and current into an obstruction at McKeesport, Pennsylvania causing her to sink. Raised and repaired.
Teaser	United States	The steamer was sunk by a piling while docked, Norfolk, Virginia. Raised and repaired.

=== 25 February ===
List of shipwrecks: 25 February 1904
Ship	State	Description
No. 221	Imperial Russian Navy	The torpedo boat capsized and sank in the Mediterranean Sea during a storm.
Vnushitelniy	Imperial Russian Navy	Russo-Japanese War: The Forel-class destroyer was sunk by gunfire in Golubinaya Bight in Pigeon Bay on the southwestern end of the Liaotung Peninsula, Manchuria, China, by the protected cruisers Chitose, Kasagi, Takasago, and Yoshino (all Imperial Japanese Navy).

=== 27 February ===
List of shipwrecks: 27 February 1904
Ship	State	Description
M. F. Plant	United States	The steamer's bow was holed by an obstruction off Marcus Hook, Pennsylvania in the Delaware River and sank in shallow water. Later raised.

=== 28 February ===
List of shipwrecks: 28 February 1904
Ship	State	Description
Norfolk	United States	The steamer burned to the waterline at Sewell's Point.
Sehome	United States	The 11-gross register ton, 38.2-foot (11.6 m) schooner dragged her anchors during a storm and was wrecked in Lynn Canal in Southeast Alaska. Her crew of two survived.

=== Unknown date ===
List of shipwrecks: Unknown date February 1904
Ship	State	Description
Assante	Italy	The steamer stranded near Bereby, New Guinea.
Josie	Canada	The schooner was abandoned at sea sometime in February.
Laome	United Kingdom	The steamer struck a rock and sank 160 miles (260 km) south of Rangoon, Burma before 10 February. The crew were rescued the next day by Gracchus (Australia).
Pena Racias	Spain	The steamer stranded near Sunderland sometime before 10 February.

== March ==
=== 2 March ===
List of shipwrecks: 2 March 1904
Ship	State	Description
Lotus	United States	The laid up steamer was sunk at dock by ice at Cincinnati, Ohio. Total loss.
Monterey	United States	The steamer was caught in a heavy windstorm in the Ohio River and sank near Diamond Island, Kentucky. Raised and repaired.

=== 3 March ===
List of shipwrecks: 3 March 1904
Ship	State	Description
Mary U. Githens	United States	The steamer burned to the waterline and sank at dock in Lebanon, Delaware. Wreck removed by 8 July with pieces of the wreckage pulled up above the high tide mark.
Michael J. Coffey	United States	The tow steamer listed in a squall causing her to fill and sink in the North River.
Unidentified barge	United States	The barge, under tow of Ashbourne (United States), sank in a collision with the ferry Chicago (United States) off the Packer Dock, Jersey City, New Jersey.

=== 4 March ===
List of shipwrecks: 4 March 1904
Ship	State	Description
Handel	Belgium	The cargo ship foundered in the North Sea, off Ramsgate, England.
Hyack	United States	The launch, and the launch Wolverine (United States), were towing the schooner Queen (United States) when Wolverine's tow line parted and fouled Hyack's propeller. Queen then ran down and sank Hyack, probably somewhere around Seattle, Washington.

=== 6 March ===
List of shipwrecks: 6 March 1904
Ship	State	Description
Valvoline	United States	The freighter caught fire at Pier 8 in the East River. She sank after being towed to the Jersey flats.

=== 9 March ===
List of shipwrecks: 9 March 1904
Ship	State	Description
Hailor	Russia	Russo-Japanese War: The steamer was reported on 15 March 1904 to have been scuttled as a blockship at the entrance to the harbor at Port Arthur, Manchuria, China, by the Imperial Russian Navy during March.
Harbin	Russia	Russo-Japanese War: The Chinese Eastern Railway steamer was reported on 15 March 1904 to have been scuttled as a blockship at the entrance to the harbor at Port Arthur, Manchuria, China, by the Imperial Russian Navy during March.

=== 10 March ===
List of shipwrecks: 10 March 1904
Ship	State	Description
Edgar Cherry	United States	The steamer struck the lock gates of Lock No. 4 in the Monongahela River and sank.
Steregushchiy	Imperial Russian Navy	Russo-Japanese War: Badly damaged and having suffered heavy casualties in combat with four Imperial Japanese Navy destroyers in the Lau-ti-shan Channel near Port Arthur, Manchuria, China, the Kretchet-class destroyer surrendered to the Japanese destroyers. However, her crew had opened the ship's Kingston valves in order to scuttle her, and two crewmen locked themselves in her engine room, sacrificing their lives to ensure that the Japanese could not enter, close the valves, and take the ship as a prize of war. The Japanese attempted to tow the sinking destroyer, but the towline broke, and she sank off the Shandong Peninsula 7 nautical miles (13 km; 8.1 mi) southeast of Mount Laoteshan and 6 nautical miles (11 km; 6.9 mi) from the Lushun Lighthouse with the loss of 49 members of her crew. There were four survivors.
Sunshine	United States	The steamer burned between Memphis, Tennessee and Cincinnati, Ohio, probably close to Memphis, a total loss. One crewman killed.

=== 11 March ===
List of shipwrecks: 11 March 1904
Ship	State	Description
RMS Scotia	United Kingdom	The cable layer was approaching Guam to deliver cable and spares when she went off course while entering Apra Harbor and ran hard aground on a nearby reef. Weather conditions deteriorated and the ship broke in two and sank. The wreck is now a popular diving location.
Shenango No. 1	United States	The 1,940-gross register ton railroad car ferry caught fire while trapped in ice in Lake Erie approximately 150 feet (46 m) east of the breakwater at Conneaut, Ohio, and became a total loss. One crewmen died.

=== 13 March ===
List of shipwrecks: 13 March 1904
Ship	State	Description
City of Boston	United States	The ferry struck a waterlogged and abandoned mud scow adrift in the channel in Boston Harbor off Boston, Massachusetts. and was beached to prevent her from sinking.

=== 17 March ===
List of shipwrecks: 17 March 1904
Ship	State	Description
M. B. Goble	United States	The steamer capsized at the mouth of the Big Sandy River. Total loss. Two crewmen killed.

=== 18 March ===
List of shipwrecks: 18 March 1904
Ship	State	Description
HMS A1	Royal Navy	The Holland-class submarine was accidentally rammed by Berwick Castle (United Kingdom) and sunk with the loss of all eleven crew in The Solent. She was later raised, repaired, and returned to service.

=== 19 March ===
List of shipwrecks: 19 March 1904
Ship	State	Description
Manx Maid	United Kingdom	The steam coaster grounded on rocks at Stanton Point off Port Soderick, Isle of Man in heavy weather and fog (Point of Ayr, Flintshire for Laxey, Isle of Man, with coal); the crew landed in the ship's boat.
Unidentified barge	United States	The dumper barge, under tow of Harry G. Runkle (United States), sank in a collision with El Alba (United States) off the Scotland Lightship.

=== 23 March ===
List of shipwrecks: 23 March 1904
Ship	State	Description
Ida	United States	The tow steamer struck a bridge pier and sank at Memphis, Tennessee, a total loss.

=== 25 March ===
List of shipwrecks: 25 March 1904
Ship	State	Description
Columbia	United States	The steamer sank after striking a snag near Charleston, West Virginia. Raised and repaired.

=== 26 March ===
List of shipwrecks: 26 March 1904
Ship	State	Description
Hanyei Maru	Japan	Russo-Japanese War: The 64- or 76-gross register ton (sources disagree) steamer was seized by a force of Imperial Russian Navy warships and after the removal of her crew and passengers was sunk by gunfire by Russian destroyers in Lau-ti-shan Channel just off the Miao-tao Islands.

=== 27 March ===
List of shipwrecks: 27 March 1904
Ship	State	Description
Chiyo Maru	Imperial Japanese Navy	Russo-Japanese War: The crew of the 1,746-gross register ton transport used an explosive charge to scuttle her as a blockship just outside and to the west of the entrance to the harbor at Port Arthur, Manchuria, China, in a failed attempt to block the entrance.
Fukui Maru	Imperial Japanese Navy	Russo-Japanese War: The 2,943-gross register ton transport was torpedoed by Russian forces in the entrance to the harbor at Port Arthur, Manchuria, China, as she maneuvered to her planned scuttling position so that her crew could sink her in the entrance as a blockship. Her crew then used an explosive charge to scuttle her just outside and to the west of the entrance but failed to block it.
Yahiko Maru	Imperial Japanese Navy	Russo-Japanese War: The transport's crew used an explosive charge to scuttle her as a blockship just inside the west side of the entrance to the harbor at Port Arthur, Manchuria, China, in a failed attempt to block the entrance.
Yoneyama Maru	Imperial Japanese Navy	Russo-Japanese War: The 2,693-gross register ton transport was torpedoed by Russian forces while her crew prepared to scuttle her as a blockship at the entrance to the harbor at Port Arthur, Manchuria, China. She sank just outside and east of the entrance and failed to block it.

=== 28 March ===
List of shipwrecks: 28 March 1904
Ship	State	Description
Adriatic	United Kingdom	The 105-foot (32 m), 144-ton steam trawler was sunk when struck by trawler Parramatta (United Kingdom) in the North Sea. The crew took to her boat and was picked up by trawler Thrush (United Kingdom).

=== 31 March ===
List of shipwrecks: 31 March 1904
Ship	State	Description
George P. Taylor	United States	The tug was sunk in a collision with Navahoe (United States) in the North River.

=== Unknown date ===
List of shipwrecks: Unknown date 1904
Ship	State	Description
Ninguta	Russia	Russo-Japanese War: The steamer was reported on 15 March 1904 to have been scuttled as a blockship at the entrance to the harbor at Port Arthur, Manchuria, China, by the Imperial Russian Navy during March.
Sungari	Russia	Russo-Japanese War: The steamer was reported on 15 March 1904 to have been scuttled as a blockship at the entrance to the harbor at Port Arthur, Manchuria, China, by the Imperial Russian Navy during March.

== April ==
=== 8 April ===
List of shipwrecks: 8 April 1904
Ship	State	Description
Rival	United States	The schooner ran aground and was wrecked on the south end of Brigantine Beach.

=== 9 April ===
List of shipwrecks: 9 April 1904
Ship	State	Description
Aurora	United States	The steamer struck an unknown object in the Blackwater River in Virginia and was beached.
Peerless	United States	The motor vessel was sunk by ice at Painted Woods, North Dakota, a total loss.

=== 11 April ===
List of shipwrecks: 11 April 1904
Ship	State	Description
Colon	United States	The steamer was damaged on Remedios Reef, El Salvador and was beached at Acajutla. A total loss.
Frank Canfield	United States	The tug was wrecked at Point Au Sable, Michigan when her steering gear broke. The vessel was a total loss. Three crewmen were killed and two were rescued by life-saving crew stationed on the point.
Sigrid	Norway	The 196.2-foot (59.8 m), 1,078-ton barque was dismasted on 9 December, sinking on 11 December 8 miles (13 km) west northwest of Noup Head, Westray, Orkney Islands. Her captain was later charged with sinking her with criminal intent. The crew were taken off by St Clair (United Kingdom).

=== 12 April ===
List of shipwrecks: 12 April 1904
Ship	State	Description
Alice	United States	The barge was sunk in a collision with the steamer Barnstable (United Kingdom) off the Eddystone Wharf at Eddystone, Pennsylvania.

=== 13 April ===
List of shipwrecks: 13 April 1904
Ship	State	Description
Petropavlovsk	Imperial Russian Navy	Russo-Japanese War: The Petropavlovsk-class battleship struck a mine in Korea Bay off Port Arthur Manchuria, China. The mine's detonation caused the explosions of several ammunition magazines and boilers in a chain reaction, and she sank in about a minute with the loss of 646 lives. Vice Admiral Stepan Makarov, commander-in-chief of the Russian Pacific Squadron, was among the dead. Her 89 survivors were rescued by Russian warships.
Strashniy	Imperial Russian Navy	Russo-Japanese War: The Kretchet-class destroyer was sunk by six Imperial Japanese Navy torpedo boats in Korea Bay off the Elliot Islands.

=== 14 April ===
List of shipwrecks: 14 April 1904
Ship	State	Description
Baron Lambermont	Belgium	The SA Tonnage, Antwerp cargo ship struck rocks and sank at Cape Blanc, Bizerte, Tunisia.
Evangeline	United States	The steamer was destroyed by fire in the Escambia River.

=== 16 April ===
List of shipwrecks: 16 April 1904
Ship	State	Description
No. 185	United States	The barge was sunk off the Horse Shoe Buoy in a gale.

=== 18 April ===
List of shipwrecks: 18 April 1904
Ship	State	Description
Unknown dredge	United States	A dredge sank in a collision with tow steamer Robert Palmer (United States) in the Bay Ridge Channel in the harbor of New York City.

=== 20 April ===
List of shipwrecks: 20 April 1904
Ship	State	Description
Levi Hart	United States	The schooner was sunk when she tried to cut between two barges being towed in Pollock Rip slue.

=== 23 April ===
List of shipwrecks: 23 April 1904
Ship	State	Description
Arthur McArdle	United States	The schooner was wrecked when forced onto Egg Island, near Bermuda, by a strong current.

=== 25 April ===
List of shipwrecks: 25 April 1904
Ship	State	Description
Goyo Maru	Japan	Russo-Japanese War: With a cargo of fish on board, the 600-gross register ton merchant ship was boarded, searched, torpedoed, and sunk by Imperial Russian Navy torpedo boats in the harbor at Gensan, Korea.
Haginoura Maru (or Oginoura Maru)	Japan	Russo-Japanese War: The 219- or 220-gross register ton merchant ship was sunk in the Sea of Japan off Korea by a squadron consisting of the armored cruisers Gromoboi and Rossia, the protected cruiser Bogatyr, and torpedo boats (all Imperial Russian Navy).
Hai Tien	Imperial Chinese Navy	Steaming in fog, the protected cruiser overshot the entrance to the Yangtze River and was wrecked on a pinnacle rock just off the Shengsi Islands in Hangzhou Bay on the coast of China. Chinese customs cruisers rescued her crew.

=== 26 April ===
List of shipwrecks: 26 April 1904
Ship	State	Description
Kinshu Maru	Imperial Japanese Navy	"Last scene on board the Japanese transport Kinshu Maru." (1904 Japanese illustration) Russo-Japanese War: The armed transport was stopped in the Sea of Japan off Gensan, Korea, by a squadron consisting of the armored cruisers Gromoboi and Rossia, the protected cruiser Bogatyr, and torpedo boats (all Imperial Russian Navy). Her crew surrendered and was removed, but a company of Imperial Japanese Army infantry on board refused to surrender, so the Russians torpedoed her with the soldiers still on board. The soldiers then opened rifle fire on the nearest cruiser, and the Russian squadron opened gunnery fire on Kinshu Maru and sank her in about 15 minutes, Rossia receiving the credit for the sinking. The Japanese soldiers continued to fire until Kinshu Maru sank beneath them.

=== 28 April ===
List of shipwrecks: 28 April 1904
Ship	State	Description
Lapwing	United Kingdom	The barque was destroyed by fire at Bermuda.

=== 29 April ===
List of shipwrecks: 29 April 1904
Ship	State	Description
Unknown barges	United States	Two barges, under the tow of Anthracite (United States), sank in a collision with an anchored flatboat in the East River.

=== 30 April ===
List of shipwrecks: 30 April 1904
Ship	State	Description
Pocahontas	United States	The steamer burned to the waterline at Richmond, Virginia.

=== Unknown date ===
List of shipwrecks: unknown April 1904
Ship	State	Description
Carrie	United States	The coal barge sank at the entrance to Little Egg Harbor Bay, New Jersey sometime in April. Wreck removed with dynamite by 4 September.

== May ==
=== 3 May ===
List of shipwrecks: 3 May 1904
Ship	State	Description
Aikoku Maru	Imperial Japanese Navy	Russo-Japanese War: Approaching the entrance to the harbor at Port Arthur, Manchuria, China, where she was to be scuttled as a blockship, the 1,781-gross register ton transport struck a mine 110 yards (100 m) off the entrance and sank instantly, failing in her attempt to block the entrance. Eight of her 24 crewmen were left missing.
Asagao Maru	Imperial Japanese Navy	Russo-Japanese War: The 2,464-gross register ton transport was scuttled as a blockship just outside the entrance to the harbor at Port Arthur, Manchuria, China, in a failed attempt to block the entrance. Her entire crew of 18 was left missing.
Mikawa Maru	Imperial Japanese Navy	Russo-Japanese War: The 1,967-gross register ton transport was scuttled as a blockship just inside the entrance to the harbor at Port Arthur, Manchuria, China, in a failed attempt to block the entrance. One of her 18 crewmen was killed.
Odaru Maru	Imperial Japanese Navy	Russo-Japanese War: The 2,547-gross register ton transport was scuttled as a blockship at the entrance to the harbor at Port Arthur, Manchuria, China, in a failed attempt to block the entrance. Her entire crew of 18 men was left missing.
Sagami Maru	Imperial Japanese Navy	Russo-Japanese War: The 1,926-gross register ton transport was scuttled as a blockship at the entrance to the harbor at Port Arthur, Manchuria, China, in a failed attempt to block the entrance. One member of her crew was killed, and her other 23 crewmen were left missing.
Sakura Maru	Imperial Japanese Navy	Russo-Japanese War: The 2,978-gross register ton transport was scuttled as a blockship just outside the entrance to the harbor at Port Arthur, Manchuria, China, in a failed attempt to block the entrance. One member of her crew was killed, and her other 19 crewmen were left missing.
Totomi Maru	Imperial Japanese Navy	Russo-Japanese War: The 1,953-gross register ton transport was scuttled as a blockship just inside the entrance to the harbor at Port Arthur, Manchuria, China, in a failed attempt to block the entrance. Three of her 18-man crew were left missing.
Yedo Maru	Imperial Japanese Navy	Russo-Japanese War: The 1,724-gross register ton transport was scuttled as a blockship at the entrance to the harbor at Port Arthur, Manchuria, China, in a failed attempt to block the entrance. Two of her 18-man crew were killed.

=== 12 May ===
List of shipwrecks: 12 May 1904
Ship	State	Description
No. 48	Imperial Japanese Navy	Russo-Japanese War: The torpedo boat struck a mine and sank in Kerr Bay on the Korea Bay coast of the Liaotung Peninsula with the loss of seven of her crew.

=== 13 May ===
List of shipwrecks: 13 May 1904
Ship	State	Description
Ottawa	United States	The steamer became waterlogged 2 1/2 miles (4.0 km) off the Sturgeon Bay Canal. She was towed into the canal basin and sank. The crew made it to shore in small boats.

=== 14 May ===
List of shipwrecks: 14 May 1904
Ship	State	Description
City of Rossford	United States	The steamer sank at anchor in Sandusky Bay when caulking worked out of her butts.
Miyako	Imperial Japanese Navy	Russo-Japanese War: The Miyako-class unprotected cruiser struck a mine and sank in the harbor off Dalniy, Manchuria, China, with the loss of two crewmen.
Pleiades	United States	The schooner was sunk in a collision in thick fog with Morro Castle (United States).

=== 15 May ===
List of shipwrecks: 15 May 1904
Ship	State	Description
Bogatyr	Imperial Russian Navy	Russo-Japanese War: The Bogatyr-class protected cruiser ran aground in a rock in Amur Bay near Vladivostok, Russia. She was later refloated and docked at Vladivostok, but was too badly damaged to be repaired until after the Russo-Japanese War ended in 1905.
Hatsuse	Imperial Japanese Navy	Russo-Japanese War: The Shikishima-class battleship sank in Korea Bay off Port Arthur, Manchuria, China, at 38°37′N 121°20′E when her ammunition magazine detonated after she struck two Russian mines. A total of 496 sailors were lost; 366 were saved.
Tatsuta	Imperial Japanese Navy	Russo-Japanese War: The dispatch vessel, a former unprotected cruiser, ran aground in the Elliot Islands in Korea Bay. She was refloated, repaired, and returned to service.
Yashima	Imperial Japanese Navy	Russo-Japanese War: The Fuji-class battleship capsized and sank in Korea Bay near Encounter Rock at 38°34′N 121°40′E eight hours after striking a Russian mine off Port Arthur, Manchuria, China.
Yoshino	Imperial Japanese Navy	Russo-Japanese War: The Yoshino-class protected cruiser capsized and sank after she was accidentally rammed by the armored cruiser Kasuga (Imperial Japanese Navy) in fog in Korea Bay. A total of 318 sailors were lost; of her 101 survivors, Kasuga's boats picked up 96 and other Japanese vessels rescued five.

=== 16 May ===
List of shipwrecks: 16 May 1904
Ship	State	Description
Balclutha	United States	During a voyage from San Francisco, California, to Karluk, District of Alaska, carrying 80 fishermen, 20 crewmen, and a cargo of cannery supplies, sheep and cattle, the 1,554-ton, 256.3-foot (78.1 m) ship was wrecked in fog and darkness without loss of life on a reef in the Geese Island Strait in the Kodiak Archipelago. She later was sold, refloated, repaired, and returned to service with the name Star of Alaska (United States).

=== 17 May ===
List of shipwrecks: 17 May 1904
Ship	State	Description
Akatsuki	Imperial Japanese Navy	Russo-Japanese War: The destroyer struck a mine and sank off Dalniy, Manchuria, China, at 38°38′N 121°05′E.

=== 18 May ===
List of shipwrecks: 18 May 1904
Ship	State	Description
Ōshima	Imperial Japanese Navy	Russo-Japanese War: The gunboat collided in fog with the gunboat Akagi (Imperial Japanese Navy) in Society Bay between Murchison Island and Point Hudson on the Liaotung Peninsula in Manchuria, China, and sank without loss of life at 39°01′N 121°08′E.

=== 22 May ===
List of shipwrecks: 22 May 1904
Ship	State	Description
Dixie	United States	The small pleasure craft was destroyed when it ran under the wheel of Sunshine (United States) in the Louisville, Kentucky area.

=== 24 May ===
List of shipwrecks: 24 May 1904
Ship	State	Description
Alton	United States	The freighter foundered in rough weather in San Francisco Bay. Salvaged and converted into an oil barge.

=== 25 May ===
List of shipwrecks: 25 May 1904
Ship	State	Description
Thomas Chubb	United States	The tug struck a sunken wreck in the basin at Albany, New York and sank.

=== 26 May ===
List of shipwrecks: 26 May 1904
Ship	State	Description
Fred Wilson	United States	The tow steamer was destroyed when her boilers exploded at West Louisville, Kentucky. 17 crewmen were killed or mortally wounded, 5 were wounded, with 10 uninjured survivors.
Vnimatelni	Imperial Russian Navy	Russo-Japanese War: The Forel-class destroyer ran aground either on a rock in Pigeon Bay or off Murchison Island in Kinchau Bay off the coast of the Liaotung Peninsula, Manchuria, China. The destroyer Vuinoslivi (Imperial Russian Navy) destroyed her with a torpedo to prevent her capture by Japanese forces.

=== 29 May ===
List of shipwrecks: 29 May 1904
Ship	State	Description
Joe Pinkett	United States	The vessel caught fire at dock at Bensonhurst, Brooklyn, when a kerosene lamp exploded. The fire was put out by the fire department. When a fireman went to check to hold to make sure the fire was out there was an explosion that sank the vessel and mortally wounding the fireman who died on 31 May. The vessel was raised the next day.

=== 30 May ===
List of shipwrecks: 30 May 1904
Ship	State	Description
M. Shields	United States	The steamer was destroyed by fire at dock at Portage Lake, Michigan.
O. B. Green	United States	The tug capsized and sank in the south branch of the Chicago River.
Westford	United States	The steamer burned to the waterline in Georgian Bay.

== June ==
=== 3 June ===
List of shipwrecks: 3 June 1904
Ship	State	Description
Chattanooga	United States	The steamer struck a rock reef at Big Chain on the Tennessee River and sank due to an aide to navigation being out of place.

=== 4 June ===
List of shipwrecks: 4 June 1904
Ship	State	Description
Niagara	United States	The steamer was wrecked in fog and heavy seas on Knife Island off the north shore of Lake Superior and broke up. Her boiler and machinery were salvaged. Her crew was rescued by the tug Edna G. (United States).

=== 5 June ===
List of shipwrecks: 5 June 1904
Ship	State	Description
Josie	United States	The steamer burned at Cape Girardeau, Missouri, a total loss.
Lorberry	United States	The barge, under tow of Gettysburg (United States), sank in a collision with Tallahassee (United States) near the west entrance to Vineyard Sound. Her captain was killed, the other three crewmen were rescued by Tallahassee.

=== 11 June ===
List of shipwrecks: 11 June 1904
Ship	State	Description
Del Norte	United States	The schooner ran ashore at the mouth of the Siuslaw River. She was salvaged, repaired and returned to service.

=== 13 June ===
List of shipwrecks: 13 June 1904
Ship	State	Description
Unknown motor launch	United States	A motor launch was sunk in a collision with Nautilus (United States) at Burlington, Iowa. Two drowned, four were rescued by Nautilus.
Vixen	United States	The steamer sank in the St. Johns River. Her engineer jumped overboard and drowned.

=== 14 June ===
List of shipwrecks: 14 June 1904
Ship	State	Description
Ariel	United Kingdom	The 60-foot (18.3 m) towing lighter (tug) was wrecked off Haverigg Point in the Millum Channel in rough weather.

=== 15 June ===
List of shipwrecks: 15 June 1904
Ship	State	Description
Fanchon	United States	The steamer was sunk in the Harbor at Duluth, Minnesota, when her hull was slashed by the prop of Sonora (United States). Later raised.
General Slocum	United States	Fireboats (left) fight the fire aboard the wreck of General Slocum (right). The excursion paddle steamer caught fire and burned out on the East River in New York City before beaching herself and sinking in shallow water off North Brother Island just off the shore of the Bronx, New York. A total of 1,021, or 958, lives were lost, 180 injured.
Hitachi Maru	Imperial Japanese Navy	Russo-Japanese War, Hitachi Maru Incident: The armed transport was sunk by gunfire by the armored cruiser Gromoboi (Imperial Russian Navy) in the southern Korean Strait with the loss of 1,086 passengers and crew; 152 survived.
Izumi Maru	Imperial Japanese Navy	Russo-Japanese War, Hitachi Maru Incident: The armed transport, operating as an unmarked hospital ship, was sunk by gunfire from the armored cruiser Gromoboi (Imperial Russian Navy) in the southern Korean Strait.

=== 16 June ===
List of shipwrecks: 16 June 1904
Ship	State	Description
Ansei Maru	Japan	Russo-Japanese War: The 105-gross register ton sailing vessel was captured and sunk in the Sea of Japan near the Oki Islands by a squadron consisting of the armored cruisers Gromoboi, Rossia, and Rurik (all Imperial Russian Navy).
Hatsiman Maru	Japan	Russo-Japanese War: The schooner was captured and sunk in the Sea of Japan by a squadron consisting of the armored cruisers Gromoboi, Rossia, and Rurik (all Imperial Russian Navy).
Sado Maru	Imperial Japanese Navy	Russo-Japanese War, Hitachi Maru Incident: The auxiliary cruiser, operating as a troopship, grounded on Okinoshima 30 hours after the armored cruiser Rurik (Imperial Russian Navy) torpedoed her twice in the southern Korean Strait, killing 239 of her passengers and crew.
Seiyei Maru	Japan	Russo-Japanese War: The 114-gross register ton sailing vessel was captured and sunk in the Sea of Japan by a squadron consisting of the armored cruisers Gromoboi, Rossia, and Rurik (all Imperial Russian Navy).
Yawata Maru	Japan	Russo-Japanese War: The 198-gross register ton sailing vessel was captured and sunk in the Sea of Japan near the Oki Islands by a squadron consisting of the armored cruisers Gromoboi, Rossia, and Rurik (all Imperial Russian Navy).

=== 17 June ===
List of shipwrecks: 17 June 1904
Ship	State	Description
Costa Rican	United Kingdom	The cargo ship ran aground at Plum Point, Jamaica. She later was refloated and towed to New York City in the United States. She subsequently was scrapped.
HMS Sparrowhawk	Royal Navy	During fleet exercises off the coast of China, the destroyer struck an uncharted rock in the East China Sea off the mouth of the Yangtze and sank without loss of life.

=== 18 June ===
List of shipwrecks: 18 June 1904
Ship	State	Description
Highlander	United States	The steamer burned to the waterline and sank in the Santee River 25 miles (40 km) above Georgetown.

=== 20 June ===
List of shipwrecks: 20 June 1904
Ship	State	Description
T. N. Barnesdall	United States	The steamer struck a log and sank at Broadfields Landing, West Virginia, in five feet (1.5 m) of water.

=== 22 June ===
List of shipwrecks: 22 June 1904
Ship	State	Description
39T	Regia Marina	The Aldebaran-class torpedo boat sank after colliding with the torpedo boats 68S and 153S (both Regia Marina).
Cleo L	United States	An explosion destroyed the auxiliary sloop yacht in New York Harbor opposite 34th Street in South Brooklyn, killing 2 men.
Mabel	United States	The tow boat caught fire in the Passaic River and was beached and the fire put out.

=== 23 June ===
List of shipwrecks: 23 June 1904
Ship	State	Description
F. H. Prince	United States	The freighter struck an obstruction off the Cleveland, Ohio breakwater and was beached.
Norge	Norway	The passenger ship struck Rockall Reef and sank. 585 passengers and 45 crew were killed. 127 survivors were rescued, 27 by the trawler Sylvia, 32 by Cervona (flag unknown), her captain and 69 others were rescued from a lifeboat by Energie (flag unknown).

=== 26 June ===
List of shipwrecks: 26 June 1904
Ship	State	Description
Nonpareil	United States	The steamer was sunk in the harbor at Duluth, Minnesota, by a large chunk of coal that was dropped into her hold.

=== 28 June ===
List of shipwrecks: 28 June 1904
Ship	State	Description
Monohansett	United States	The paddle steamer ran aground at Little Misery Island, Massachusetts.
No. 51	Imperial Japanese Navy	Russo-Japanese War: The torpedo boat was wrecked on Dangerous Reef in Korea Bay off Kerr Bay near Port Arthur, Manchuria, China, and sank.
Norge	Denmark	The Dampskibs-selskabet Thingvalla A/S ocean liner ran aground, then sank on Hasselwood Rock, Atlantic Ocean. A total of 635 lives were lost.

=== 29 June ===
List of shipwrecks: 29 June 1904
Ship	State	Description
Delfin	Imperial Russian Navy	The Minonosets No. 150-class submarine sank during a practice dive off the Baltic Shipbuilding & Mechanical Plant, Vasilevskiy Island, St. Petersburg, Russia, with the loss of 21 out of 32 crew and other personnel on board at the time. Raised on 2 August 1904, repaired and returned to service.

=== 30 June ===
List of shipwrecks: 30 June 1904
Ship	State	Description
Koun Maru	Japan	Russo-Japanese War: The 57-gross register ton merchant ship was sunk by Imperial Russian Navy torpedo boats at Gensan, Korea.
Seisho Maru	Japan	Russo-Japanese War: The 122-gross register ton merchant ship was sunk by Imperial Russian Navy torpedo boats at Gensan, Korea.
No. 204	Imperial Russian Navy	Russo-Japanese War: The torpedo boat ran aground off Gensan, Korea, and was blown up by her crew to prevent her capture by Japanese forces.

== July ==
=== 2 July ===
List of shipwrecks: 2 July 1904
Ship	State	Description
Jeanette	United States	The steamer while at dock unloading cargo took on a list breaking 1 of her deadlights through which water filled her and she sank at dock in Salem, Massachusetts. Later raised with no damage.

=== 4 July ===
List of shipwrecks: 4 July 1904
Ship	State	Description
Wichita	United States	The steamer was destroyed by fire at dock over night at Vicksburg, Mississippi.

=== 5 July ===
List of shipwrecks: 5 July 1904
Ship	State	Description
City of Denver	United States	The steamer burned in Sullivan's Slough, Puget Sound.
Kaimon	Imperial Japanese Navy	Russo-Japanese War: The corvette struck a mine and sank at Port Arthur, Manchuria, China, at 38°50′N 121°50′E with the loss of 23 crew members.
Mary D. Hume	United States	The steamer grounded on the bottom of the Nushagak River and started leaking. She freed herself four hours later and either sank in seven fathoms (42 ft; 13 m) of water. Reportedly was saved.

=== 6 July ===
List of shipwrecks: 6 July 1904
Ship	State	Description
George W. Humphrey	United States	The 142-foot (43 m), 214-ton fishing trawler struck Brenton Reef off Newport, Rhode Island, in dense fog and sank without loss of life off the northern end of the southernmost part of the reef in 20 feet (6.1 m) of water at 41°26.58′N 071°21.41′W, a total loss.
Mabel Bird	United States	The fishing steamer was wrecked on a rock in Ipswich Bay.

=== 8/9 July ===
List of shipwrecks: 8/9 July 1904
Ship	State	Description
Nemesis	United Kingdom	Foundered south of Sydney on 8/9 July 1904 during a storm, with the loss of 32 crew.

=== 10 July ===
List of shipwrecks: 10 July 1904
Ship	State	Description
Jennie Hays	United States	The fishing steamer caught fire eight miles (13 km) off Fairport, Ohio in Lake Erie and was beached.

=== 11 July ===
List of shipwrecks: 11 July 1904
Ship	State	Description
Chalmette	United States	The steamer struck an obstruction 35 miles (56 km) below Natchez, Mississippi tearing a hole in her hull. Total loss.

=== 13 July ===
List of shipwrecks: 13 July 1904
Ship	State	Description
No. 208	Imperial Russian Navy	Russo-Japanese War: The No. 208-class torpedo boat struck a mine and sank off Skryplev Island near Vladivostok, Russia.

=== 15 July ===
List of shipwrecks: 15 July 1904
Ship	State	Description
Henry D. McCord	United States	The tug was sunk in a collision with the freight lighter USS Apache ( United States Navy) in the East River off Pier 5, New York City.
West Farms	United States	The tug capsized in a collision with a float being towed by Transfer No. 16 (United States) off Pier 3 in the East River.

=== 16 July ===
List of shipwrecks: 16 July 1904
Ship	State	Description
Hipsang	United Kingdom	Russo-Japanese War: During a voyage from Niuzhuang to Yantai, China, with a cargo that included provisions, the 1,659-ton merchant ship was torpedoed and sunk by the destroyer Rastoropni (Imperial Russian Navy) after she refused to stop for inspection.
Unknown barges	United States	Eight barges, under the tow of E. Luckenback (United States), foundered in a heavy storm 1/2 mile (0.80 km) west of the Penfield Reef Light.

=== 17 July ===
List of shipwrecks: 17 July 1904
Ship	State	Description
Unknown motor launch	United States	A motor launch was sunk in a collision with Harry Randall (United States) in the Potomac River at Washington, D.C. One person died.

=== 20 July ===
List of shipwrecks: 20 July 1904
Ship	State	Description
Hokusei Maru	Japan	Russo-Japanese War: The 91-gross register ton schooner was captured and sunk in the Pacific Ocean near the Tsugaru Strait by a squadron consisting of the armored cruisers Gromoboi, Rossia, and Rurik (all Imperial Russian Navy).
Ida	United States	The steamer was attempting to land at a dock at Catawba Island on Lake Erie in heavy seas when she was thrown into the dock, breaking her bulwarks. She then listed, losing part of her cargo of stone, and sank. Her engine and gear were salvaged, then she was towed off and abandoned, eventually washing ashore on the island again.
Kiho Maru	Japan	Russo-Japanese War: The 140-gross register ton sailing vessel was captured and sunk in the Pacific Ocean near the Tsugaru Strait by a squadron consisting of the armored cruisers Gromoboi, Rossia, and Rurik (all Imperial Russian Navy).
Okassima Maru	Japan	Russo-Japanese War: The merchant ship was captured and sunk in the Sea of Japan by Imperial Russian Navy forces.
Takashima Maru	Japan	Russo-Japanese War: Carrying a cargo of 160 boxes of gunpowder for use in mining and 589 bales of miscellaneous goods, the 319-gross register ton merchant ship was captured and sunk off the Tsugaru Strait by a squadron consisting of the armored cruisers Gromoboi, Rossia, and Rurik (all Imperial Russian Navy).

=== 21 July ===
List of shipwrecks: 21 July 1904
Ship	State	Description
Geo. C. Markham	United States	The steamer was sunk at dock when struck by Geo. L. Craig (United States) at Marine City, Michigan.
R. Dunbar	United States	The steamer struck a hidden obstruction at Mitlocks Bar in the Cumberland River and sank in five feet (1.5 m) of water.

=== 22 July ===
List of shipwrecks: 22 July 1904
Ship	State	Description
Castanet	United States	The steamer caught fire shortly after leaving Kingston, Ontario due to a failure in her furnace. She was beached after the fire was extinguished. with light damage.

=== 24 July ===
List of shipwrecks: 24 July 1904
Ship	State	Description
Fukuju Maru	Japan	Russo-Japanese War: The 121-gross register ton schooner was captured and sunk in the Pacific Ocean near Tokyo Bay by a squadron consisting of the armored cruisers Gromoboi, Rossia, and Rurik (all Imperial Russian Navy).
Hakutsu Maru	Japan	Russo-Japanese War: The 91-gross register ton merchant vessel was captured and sunk in the Sea of Japan by Imperial Russian Navy forces.
Jizai Maru	Japan	Russo-Japanese War: The 199-gross register ton schooner was captured and sunk in the Pacific Ocean near Tokyo Bay by a squadron consisting of the armored cruisers Gromoboi, Rossia, and Rurik (all Imperial Russian Navy).
Knight Commander	United Kingdom	Russo-Japanese War: During a voyage from New York City to Chemulpo, Korea, with a cargo of general and railway material, the 4,306-gross register ton merchant ship was captured and sunk in the Pacific Ocean 75 nautical miles (139 km) southwest of Yokohama, Japan, by a squadron consisting of the armored cruisers Gromoboi, Rossia, and Rurik (all Imperial Russian Navy).
Leitenant Burakov	Imperial Russian Navy	Russo-Japanese War: The destroyer was torpedoed and sunk in Ta Ho Bay on the coast of China east of Port Arthur by picket boats from the battleships Mikasa and Fuji (both Imperial Japanese Navy).

=== 25 July ===
List of shipwrecks: 25 July 1904
Ship	State	Description
Della A.	United States	The fishing steamer burned at McKees Harbor, Lopez Island.
Thea	Germany	Russo-Japanese War: During a voyage to Yokohama with a cargo of fish manure and fish oil, the 1,613-gross register ton merchant ship was captured and sunk in the Pacific Ocean off the coast of Japan by a squadron consisting of the armored cruisers Gromoboi, Rossia, and Rurik (all Imperial Russian Navy).
Thomas Chubb	United States	The tug struck a sunken wreck in the basin at Albany, New York, and sank.

=== 26 July ===
List of shipwrecks: 26 July 1904
Ship	State	Description
City of Rockland	United States	The steamer ran aground in dense fog on the Upper Gangway Ledge, Mussel Ridge Channel, Maine. Her pumps could not keep up and she drifted onto the Northwest Ledge and sank. Raised and repaired.

=== 28 July ===
List of shipwrecks: 28 July 1904
Ship	State	Description
Enigma	United States	The steamer burned in San Juan Pass. The vessel's crew escaped in her boat.
John P. Hopkins	United States	The steamer was sunk at dock when New Orleans (United States) lost the tow line to her tow causing her to veer off course and strike a scow tied up at the same dock and pushing it into the Hopkins at the Lake Street Bridge, Chicago sinking her. Raised and repaired.

=== 29 July ===
List of shipwrecks: 29 July 1904
Ship	State	Description
Burnyi	Imperial Russian Navy	Russo-Japanese War: The Buinyi-class destroyer ran aground off Shantung, China. She was on a voyage from Port Arthur, China to Vladivostok. She was scuttled to prevent capture by the Japanese.
Oregon	United States	The steamer was destroyed by fire in Florida in the Halifax River near the mouth of the Tomoka River.

=== 31 July ===
List of shipwrecks: 31 July 1904
Ship	State	Description
Unknown canal boat	United States	A drifting canal boat collided with the docked Richard Peck (United States) and sank at Pier 20 in the East River.

=== Unknown date ===
List of shipwrecks: Unknown date 1904
Ship	State	Description
W J Pirrie	United Kingdom	The full-rigged ship was severely damaged by fire at Tocopilla, Chile. Subsequently hulked.

== August ==
=== 1 August ===
List of shipwrecks: 1 August 1904
Ship	State	Description
Montgomery	United Kingdom	Montgomery after breaking her back The cargo ship ran aground off Bec d'Ambès in the Gironde estuary, France on a voyage from Saigon, French Indochina, to Bordeaux and subsequently broke her back.

=== 2 August ===
List of shipwrecks: 2 August 1904
Ship	State	Description
Sivuch	Imperial Russian Navy	Russo-Japanese War: The Sivuch-class gunboat's crew scuttled her by blowing her up on the Liao River in China to prevent her capture by approaching Imperial Japanese Army forces.

=== 3 August ===
List of shipwrecks: 3 August 1904
Ship	State	Description
Monohansett	United States	The steamer was wrecked in dense fog on rocks between Big Misery Island and Little Misery Island off Beverly, Massachusetts, a total loss.

=== 4 August ===
List of shipwrecks: 4 August 1904
Ship	State	Description
Viking	United States	Carrying a 200-ton cargo of general merchandise and lumber on a voyage from San Francisco, California, to Wales, Teller, and Unalaska in the District of Alaska, the 146-ton, 108-foot (32.9 m) schooner dragged her anchors in a gale and was stranded off Cape Prince of Wales, Alaska, becoming a total loss. Her crew of six survived and unloaded her cargo with the help of Alaska Natives.

=== 5 August ===
List of shipwrecks: 5 August 1904
Ship	State	Description
Rebecca M. Smith	United States	The schooner ran aground and was wrecked at the entrance to Little Egg Harbor Bay, New Jersey in eight feet (2.4 m) feet of water. Wreck removed with dynamite by 28 September. The vessel's bowsprit towed to Atlantic City, while the rest of the wreckage was pulled ashore for use as firewood.

=== 6 August ===
List of shipwrecks: 6 August 1904
Ship	State	Description
Ella Francis	United States	The schooner was sunk in a collision in thick fog with Nantucket (United States) off Cape Cod. Four killed, one survivor rescued by Nantucket.

=== 7 August ===
List of shipwrecks: 7 August 1904
Ship	State	Description
City of Berlin	United States	The steamer was sunk in a collision with Chili (United States) at Detroit.

=== 8 August ===
List of shipwrecks: 8 August 1904
Ship	State	Description
Elizabeth	United States	While under tow by the steamer Irene (United States) from Unalaska in the Aleutian Islands to St. Michael, District of Alaska, with a cargo of 190 tons of cargo including 40 tons of coal and 100 cords of wood, the 327-ton scow sank in the Bering Sea 270 nautical miles (500 km; 310 mi) north-northwest of Cape Cheerful (54°00′50″N 166°40′20″W) on Unalaska Island. Elizabeth's only crewman was aboard Irene when Elizabeth sank.
Ganda	Belgium	The T Nolson & Co. 474-ton cargo ship was wrecked at Hell's Mouth, Llŷn Peninsula, Caernarfonshire. Ganda broke from her moorings, and one of her ropes tangled around her propeller, as her captain tried to get his ship away from the jetty. She drifted helplessly onto the rocky shore.
Otagawa Maru	Imperial Japanese Navy	Russo-Japanese War: The improvised gunboat was sunk by a mine near Port Arthur, Manchuria, China.
Queen	United States	The 12-gross register ton sternwheel paddle steamer was stranded on the Missouri River at Decatur, Nebraska. Both people on board survived.

=== 9 August ===
List of shipwrecks: 9 August 1904
Ship	State	Description
Valleta	United States	The steamer was destroyed by fire at dock at Long Island in the St. Lawrence River.

=== 10 August ===
List of shipwrecks: 10 August 1904
Ship	State	Description
Frederick	United States	The steamer sprung a leak, she then caught on a barge, careened and sank at Jefferson City, Missouri, a total loss.

=== 11 August ===
List of shipwrecks: 11 August 1904
Ship	State	Description
Burni	Imperial Russian Navy	Russo-Japanese War: The Boiki-class destroyer ran aground in the Yellow Sea off Shantung, China. Her crew scuttled the ship to prevent her capture by Japanese forces.
Reshitel'nyi	Imperial Russian Navy	Russo-Japanese War: The crew of the Kretchet-class destroyer attempted to scuttle the vessel at Chefoo, China, but the ship did not sink. The Japanese captured her the next day, repaired her and recommissioned her as Akatsuki, later renamed Yamabiko. (Imperial Japanese Navy).

=== 13 August ===
List of shipwrecks: 13 August 1904
Ship	State	Description
HMS Decoy	Royal Navy	The Daring-class destroyer was in collision with the destroyer HMS Arun (Royal Navy) off the Isles of Scilly and sank. One crew member was lost.
Dunsinane	United Kingdom	The ship, carrying granite, set sail at 7pm and ran into strong tides forcing it onto the Black Rock outside St Sampsons' harbour, Guernsey. The next few days the planking was removed from the hull and the cargo removed into waiting carts.
Recreation	United States	The 25-foot (7.6 m) motorboat capsized on the Potomac River off the Georgetown section of Washington, D.C., drowning 10 of the 14 people on board.

=== 14 August ===
List of shipwrecks: 14 August 1904
Ship	State	Description
Rurik	Imperial Russian Navy	Russo-Japanese War, Battle off Ulsan: The armored cruiser was scuttled to avoid capture after suffering heavy damage in action with the armored cruisers Iwate, Izumo, Tokiwa, and Azuma (all Imperial Japanese Navy). Japanese ships rescued about 625 survivors.
Dunsinane	United Kingdom	The barquentine, carrying a cargo of granite, set sail from Saint Sampson, Guernsey, in the Channel Islands at 7:00 p.m. and ran into strong tides which forced her onto Black Rock outside the harbour. Over the next few days, the planking was removed from her hull and her cargo removed and transferred to waiting carts.

=== 16 August ===
List of shipwrecks: 16 August 1904
Ship	State	Description
Elwood	United States	The steamer burned at Avon, Washington.

=== 17 August ===
List of shipwrecks: 17 August 1904
Ship	State	Description
HDMS Havhesten	Royal Danish Navy	The Narvhvalen-class torpedo boat collided with HDMS Støren (Royal Danish Navy) and sank in the Great Belt. Her crew were rescued. Subsequently salvaged, repaired and returned to service.

=== 18 August ===
List of shipwrecks: 18 August 1904
Ship	State	Description
Gremyashchi	Imperial Russian Navy	Russo-Japanese War: Siege of Port Arthur: The armored gunvessel sank after striking a mine near Port Arthur, Manchuria, China.

=== 19 August ===
List of shipwrecks: 19 August 1904
Ship	State	Description
Vigilant	United States	The passenger steamer sprung a leak and sank off Barkers Landing, Delaware. Pumped out and towed to Philadelphia.

=== 20 August ===
List of shipwrecks: 20 August 1904
Ship	State	Description
Novik	Imperial Russian Navy	Novik after scuttling. Russo-Japanese War: After the Novik-class protected cruiser suffered serious damage from gunfire from the protected cruiser Tsushima (Imperial Japanese Navy) during the Battle of Korsakov, her crew scuttled her in shallow water on a sandbank off Korsakov, Sakhalin Island, Russia. The protected cruiser Chitose (Imperial Japanese Navy) entered the harbor on 21 August and further damaged the wreck with gunfire. The Japanese refloated her in 1906, repaired her, and commissioned her into service as the aviso Suzuya (Imperial Japanese Navy).

=== 21 August ===
List of shipwrecks: 21 August 1904
Ship	State	Description
No. 201	Imperial Russian Navy	Russo-Japanese War: The torpedo boat was wrecked near Vladivostok, Russia.

=== 22 August ===
List of shipwrecks: 22 August 1904
Ship	State	Description
Viking	United Kingdom	The cable ship ran aground and was wreck off Belle Isle, Labrador.

=== 24 August ===
List of shipwrecks: 24 August 1904
Ship	State	Description
Calcutta	France	The barque was wrecked on Vashon Head off Port Essington, 130 miles (210 km) from Palmerston, Northern Territory, Australia. She broke up a few weeks later.
Vuinoslivi	Imperial Russian Navy	Russo-Japanese War, Siege of Port Arthur: The Forel-class destroyer was sunk by a mine off Port Arthur, China.

=== 25 August ===
List of shipwrecks: 25 August 1904
Ship	State	Description
Mischief	United States	The tug struck a hidden obstruction in New York Harbor off New York City, the momentum of her tow rolled her to starboard, she filled and sank. She was raised the same day.

=== 28 August ===
List of shipwrecks: 28 August 1904
Ship	State	Description
A. J. Johnson	United States	The steamer capsized at Wilmington, North Carolina, when the tide dropped with her railing hung up on the dock.

=== 31 August ===
List of shipwrecks: 31 August 1904
Ship	State	Description
Lady Kindersley	Canada	The motor schooner was crushed by ice in the Arctic Ocean off Point Barrow, District of Alaska. The schooner Boxer (United States) rescued her crew.

== September ==
=== 1 September ===
List of shipwrecks: 1 September 1904
Ship	State	Description
Corunna	United Kingdom	The barque ran aground at Miramar, Buenos Aires Province, Argentina. She was refloated on 12 October 1904.
Lily L	United States	During a storm, the schooner was driven ashore and wrecked on the coast of the Russian Empire at East Cape on the Chukchi Peninsula in Siberia.

=== 2 September ===
List of shipwrecks: 2 September 1904
Ship	State	Description
Laura M. Riggin	United States	The 16-gross register ton motor vessel burned on the Nanticoke River in Delaware. Both people on board survived.
Lewie	United States	The 11-gross register ton schooner sank at Two Harbors, Minnesota. Both people on board survived.

=== 3 September ===
List of shipwrecks: 3 September 1904
Ship	State	Description
Hayatori	Imperial Japanese Navy	Russo-Japanese War, Siege of Port Arthur: The destroyer struck an Imperial Russian Navy mine and sank with the loss of 17 lives in Korea Bay off Ping-tu-tao on the Liaotung Peninsula, Manchuria, China.

=== 4 September ===
List of shipwrecks: 4 September 1904
Ship	State	Description
Annie B.	United States	The steamer sank at dock in South Jacksonville, Florida. Probably raised.
Sadie	United States	During a voyage along the coast of the District of Alaska from Cape York to Kotzebue Sound and intermediate ports with 16 passengers, a crew of 22, and a cargo of 50 tons of general merchandise and coal on board, the 276-gross register ton, 150-foot (45.7 m) sidewheel paddle steamer struck a rock and settled on the bottom in 6 feet (1.8 m) of water in the Bering Sea near York City (65°30′N 167°41′W). The motor schooner Augusta C (United States) took off some passengers on 4 September. The crew and remaining passengers abandoned ship and fled to shore when a gale struck on 6 September, and waves began to break over the ship continually on 7 September. The steamer Seddon (United States) arrived on 9 September and departed with the remaining passengers on 10 September. There were no deaths, but salvage efforts failed and the ship became a total loss.

=== 5 September ===
List of shipwrecks: 5 September 1904
Ship	State	Description
Mineola	United States	The freighter struck an uncharted rock in the Sea of Okhotsk off the Tigil River. A total loss.

=== 9 September ===
List of shipwrecks: 9 September 1904
Ship	State	Description
Longfellow	United States	The steamer sprung a leak and foundered off Cape Cod, Highland Light. Her 16 crew abandoned ship in her boats.

=== 10 September ===
List of shipwrecks: 10 September 1904
Ship	State	Description
Lucia	United Kingdom	Russo-Japanese War, Siege of Port Arthur: A news article dated 10 September reported that the 658-gross register ton sailing ship had been sunk by a mine at Port Arthur, Manchuria, China. Only one member of her crew survived.
Vernie Mac	United States	The steamer sank at the mouth of Eagle Lake in 17 feet (5.2 m) of water.

=== 11 September ===
List of shipwrecks: 11 September 1904
Ship	State	Description
City of Topeka	United States	The steamer sank at dock at Seattle, Washington. raised and pumped out by 29 October.

=== 14 September ===
List of shipwrecks: 14 September 1904
Ship	State	Description
Alaska	United States	1904 Hurricane No. 2: The fishing steamer broke loose from her moorings, colliding with the dock and fishing steamer Quickstep (United States), then filled and sank at dock at Lewes, Delaware.
John A. Hughes	United States	1904 Hurricane No. 2: The tow steamer was lying at dock at the Iron Pier at the Delaware Breakwater in Delaware Bay when the hurricane hit. Her crew abandoned her, except for one who could not get to shore. She drifted ashore. Refloated on 15 or 16 September.
Majestic	United States	1904 Hurricane No. 2: The tow steamer was driven ashore on the New Jersey side of the Delaware River just above Alloway Creek opposite Reedy Island when the hurricane hit. She drifted ashore. Refloated on 15 September.
Nathan Lawrence	United States	1904 Hurricane No. 2: The schooner became waterlogged and was abandoned off Virginia.
Osaka	United Kingdom	The clipper ship was wrecked on 14 September 1904 on Kuril Islands on a voyage from Tsingtao to Nicolaieosk with general cargo.
William H. Archer	United States	The 95-gross register ton schooner sank during a voyage from Bangor, Maine, to Vineyard Haven, Massachusetts, with the loss of all four people aboard.

=== 15 September ===
List of shipwrecks: 15 September 1904
Ship	State	Description
Alden S. Swan	United States	1904 Hurricane No. 2: The fishing steamer, at dock in Lewes, Delaware, broke loose and was driven ashore.
D. K. Neal	United States	The steamer struck a snag and sank, probably at Norfolk, Virginia.
Dependence	United States	With no one on board, the 14-gross register ton motor vessel burned at Tampa, Florida.
Georgie D. Loud	United States	The 175-gross register ton schooner was abandoned in the Atlantic Ocean 50 nautical miles (93 km; 58 mi) northeast of Cape Cod, Massachusetts. All five people on board survived.
Hanna A. Lennon	United States	1904 Hurricane No. 2: The fishing steamer was driven high and dry when the hurricane hit. Later pulled off.
I. W. Durham	United States	1904 Hurricane No. 2: The tow steamer suffered superstructure damage, then filled and sank 1/2 mile (0.80 km) off and below the mouth of the Christiana River. Eight of the ten crewmen were killed.
Joseph Church	United States	The steamer dragged anchor in a gale and was wrecked on Peaked Hill bar, off Cape Cod, where she was broken up by the waves.

=== 18 September ===
List of shipwrecks: 18 September 1904
Ship	State	Description
Heien	Imperial Japanese Navy	Russo-Japanese War, Siege of Port Arthur: The armored gunboat struck an Imperial Russian Navy mine and sank in five minutes with the loss of 196 lives off Reef Island in Pigeon Bay off the southwest end of the Liaotung Peninsula, Manchuria, China. Imperial Japanese Navy forces discovered four survivors on Reef Island on 19 September.

=== 22 September ===
List of shipwrecks: 22 September 1904
Ship	State	Description
Vesta	United States	The tug was in a collision with the steamer H. F. Dimock (United States) in Boston Harbor off Boston, Massachusetts, and was beached to prevent her from sinking in deep water.

=== 25 September ===
List of shipwrecks: 25 September 1904
Ship	State	Description
Noord	Netherlands	The ship was wrecked southeast of Burhou, Alderney, Channel Islands.

=== 26 September ===
List of shipwrecks: 26 September 1904
Ship	State	Description
HMS Chamois	Royal Navy	The Star-class destroyer lost a propeller blade at speed. The blade pierced the hull and the ship foundered in the Gulf of Patras without loss of life.
Osaka	United Kingdom	Russo-Japanese War: Japanese forces found the 546-gross register ton sailing vessel stranded on Etorofu in the Kuril Islands and captured her. She had run aground during a voyage from Shanghai, China, to Vladivostok, Russia.
Ruby	United States	The steamer was sunk in a collision with Heck (United States) in the St. Johns River 1/4 mile (0.40 km) south of the Mandarin Dock, Jacksonville, Florida.

=== 29 September ===
List of shipwrecks: 29 September 1904
Ship	State	Description
Dewey	United States	The steamer sank at dock over night at Norfolk, Virginia.

=== 30 September ===
List of shipwrecks: 30 September 1904
Ship	State	Description
Adolphe	France	Adolphe The barquentine was driven into the wreck of Colonist and sank at Newcastle, New South Wales, Australia. All 32 crew were rescued.
Secret	United Kingdom	The 51.9-foot (15.8 m) trawling smack was run down and damaged by the steam trawler City of Manchester (United Kingdom) off the promenade at Fleetwood, England and beached. Deemed uneconomical to repair due to age, she was broken up.

=== Unknown date ===
List of shipwrecks: September date 1904
Ship	State	Description
Willard Mudgett	United States	The bark sailed from Newport News, Virginia on 10 September to Bangor, Maine with a cargo of coal. It was last reported on 13 September from a location "30 miles east-southeast from Fenwicks Island". Willard Mudgett perhaps "foundered in the heavy southeast gale that prevailed on 13 September" or was caught in the second hurricane of the 1904 season as it worked its way up the eastern coast. With a crew of ten men, Captain Fred Blanchard was in command of the ship at the time of its disappearance. His father, Captain William H. Blanchard, was a passenger.

== October ==
=== 1 October ===
List of shipwrecks: 1 October 1904
Ship	State	Description
No. 202	Imperial Russian Navy	Russo-Japanese War: The torpedo boat was sunk in a collision near Vladivostok, Russia.
Nellie	United States	The tow steamer struck a submerged object one-half mile (0.80 km) below San Hickney and was beached. The hole was patched and the vessel was pulled off.
Volunteer	United States	The 23-gross register ton schooner was stranded in "Bdat" Harbor in Michigan. All three people on board survived.

=== 3 October ===
List of shipwrecks: 3 October 1904
Ship	State	Description
Iron Chief	United States	The steamer sprung a leak and sank in Saginaw Bay.
Mayflower	United States	The steamer burned and sank at dock at Pittsburgh, Pennsylvania.

=== 4 October ===
List of shipwrecks: 4 October 1904
Ship	State	Description
Congress	United States	The lumber steamer burned at anchor in a gale at South Manitou Island and sank in 165 feet (50 m) of water.
Osprey	United States	The ferry burned to the waterline at the Ferry House of the Philadelphia and Billingsport Ferry Company in Billingsport, New Jersey.
Ralph W.	United States	The launch was sunk in a collision with a barge in the Christiana River.
Rock Island	United States	The steamer grounded on a shoal in the Yukon River seven miles (11 km) above Eagle City, Alaska. She backed off the shoal and sank with the bow in four feet (1.2 m) of water and the stern in six feet (1.8 m). Raised fairly soon after.
Sitka	United States	The steamer in fog and rain struck a rocky ledge off Point Au Sable in Lake Superior. The ship was beaten to pieces over the next couple days. Her boilers were salvaged and towed to Grand Marais, Minnesota in the Fall of 1906 where they remained submerged until brought up in July 1907.
West Side	United States	The laid up ferry burned to the waterline at the Ferry House of the Philadelphia and Billingsport Ferry Company in Billingsport, New Jersey.

=== 5 October ===
List of shipwrecks: 5 October 1904
Ship	State	Description
Hunter	United States	The steamer caught fire at dock at Grand Marais, Michigan and burned to the waterline, a total loss.
John W. Thomas	United States	The steamer struck a log at Blue River Island and sank. Raised and repaired.

=== 8 October ===
List of shipwrecks: 8 October 1904
Ship	State	Description
Cameroon	United Kingdom	The Elder Dempster 1,862-gross register ton passenger-cargo ship was holed and beached on the coast of Liberia.

=== 10 October ===
List of shipwrecks: 10 October 1904
Ship	State	Description
F. A. Goebel	United States	The steamer was sunk by a snag near Kenova, West Virginia. Raised and repaired.

=== 11 October ===
List of shipwrecks: 11 October 1904
Ship	State	Description
Bob Dudley	United States	The steamer struck a hidden obstruction near Smithland, Kentucky, and sank in six feet (1.8 m) of water. Later raised.

=== 12 October ===
List of shipwrecks: 12 October 1904
Ship	State	Description
C. H. Bradley	United States	The tug became a total loss at St. Michael, District of Alaska.

=== 13 October ===
List of shipwrecks: 13 October 1904
Ship	State	Description
Gromoboi	Imperial Russian Navy	The cruiser ran aground at the entrance to Posyet Bay and was damaged. She was on a voyage from Vladivostok to Posyet Bay. She was refloated and was assisted back to Vladivostok by the cruiser Bogatyr (Imperial Russian Navy). Subsequently repaired and returned to service.

=== 16 October ===
List of shipwrecks: 16 October 1904
Ship	State	Description
Georges Valentine	Italy	The barque sank in a storm off Hutchinson Island, Florida, United States (27°11′55.8″N 80°09′49.8″W).
Seneca Chief	United States	The out of commission steamer was destroyed by fire in Wilson Harbor on Lake Ontario.

=== 17 October ===
List of shipwrecks: 17 October 1904
Ship	State	Description
Eloise	United States	1904 Hurricane No. 4: The steamer was sunk in a hurricane at Sanford, Florida.
Junius S. Morgan	United States	The steamer struck a hidden obstruction at Bird's Point, Missouri and sank in nine feet (2.7 m) of water. Total loss.

=== 20 October ===
List of shipwrecks: 20 October 1904
Ship	State	Description
Comte de Smet de Naeyer	Belgium	The 267-foot (81 m) 1,863-ton sail training ship, while fitting out in James Watt Dock, Greenock, Scotland, slipped over on her beam ends and sank. It took four weeks to raise her.

=== 22 October ===
List of shipwrecks: 22 October 1904
Ship	State	Description
Crane	United Kingdom	Russo-Japanese War, Dogger Bank incident: The steam fishing trawler was sunk by gunfire by ships of the Second Pacific Squadron (Imperial Russian Navy) near the Dogger Bank in the North Sea with the loss of her captain and first mate after the Russian warships mistook a fleet of British fishing trawlers from Kingston upon Hull for Imperial Japanese Navy torpedo boats during the early morning hours of darkness.
Ohio	United Kingdom	The steamer was wrecked at Ping Yang Inlet, Korea.

=== 23 October ===
List of shipwrecks: 23 October 1904
Ship	State	Description
L. J. Perry	United States	Carrying a cargo of 21 tons of general merchandise and a crew of five, the 41-gross register ton, 77-foot (23.5 m) steam cargo vessel was blown onto the beach and wrecked during a gale in the harbor at Kayak (59°59′45″N 144°22′10″W) on Kayak Island off the south-central coast of the District of Alaska.

=== 24 October ===
List of shipwrecks: 24 October 1904
Ship	State	Description
Seminole	United States	The steamer sank over night at Clark's Dock, Jacksonville, Florida.

=== 25 October ===
List of shipwrecks: 25 October 1904
Ship	State	Description
Zabiyaka	Imperial Russian Navy	Russo-Japanese War, Siege of Port Arthur: The gunboat was sunk by Imperial Japanese Army artillery fire at Port Arthur, Manchuria, China.

=== 26 October ===
List of shipwrecks: 26 October 1904
Ship	State	Description
Eliza H. Strong	United States	The steamer burned in Lake Huron off Lexington, Michigan.

=== 27 October ===
List of shipwrecks: 27 October 1904
Ship	State	Description
Doctor York	United States	The steamer burned to the waterline at Kenova, West Virginia.
Mainlander	United States	The steamer was sunk in a collision with the tug Sea Lion (United States) off West Point Light in Puget Sound in dense fog.
Sibilla	United States	The steamer struck a snag and sank five miles (8.0 km) above the mouth of Bayou Grosse Tete in six feet (1.8 m) of water. Probably raised.

=== 28 October ===
List of shipwrecks: 28 October 1904
Ship	State	Description
Skagit Queen	United States	The steamer was loading cargo from the river bank near Fir, Washington, when she was caught on a snag tilting her till she filled and sank. Later raised and was undamaged.

=== 29 October ===
List of shipwrecks: 29 October 1904
Ship	State	Description
Bart E. Linehan	United States	The steamer sank at City dock, Louisville, Kentucky when her seams opened up. Later raised.

=== 30 October ===
List of shipwrecks: 30 October 1904
Ship	State	Description
Angara	Imperial Russian Navy	Russo-Japanese War, Siege of Port Arthur: The auxiliary cruiser was sunk by Imperial Japanese Army field guns at Port Arthur, Manchuria, China.

== November ==
=== 2 November ===
List of shipwrecks: 2 November 1904
Ship	State	Description
Bruce	United States	The steamer caught fire in the engine room at dock at Escanaba, Michigan and burned to the waterline.
Volunteer	Canada	The schooner was wrecked off Lingan Bar, Bridgeport.

=== 4 November ===
List of shipwrecks: 4 November 1904
Ship	State	Description
Columbia	United States	The ferry collided with the steamer City of Lowell (United States) in dense fog on the East River in New York City, pushing her toward the Brooklyn shore, where she sank. She was raised and repaired.

=== 6 November ===
List of shipwrecks: 6 November 1904
Ship	State	Description
Atago	Imperial Japanese Navy	Russo-Japanese War, Siege of Port Arthur: The Maya-class gunboat was wrecked on the coast of the Liaotung Peninsula near Port Arthur, Manchuria, China.
Panther	United States	The laid-up pleasure steamer was destroyed at Provuncher's Shipyard in East Providence, Rhode Island, by a fire that spread from a nearby building.

=== 7 November ===
List of shipwrecks: 7 November 1904
Ship	State	Description
Challenger	United States	The lime schooner caught fire off Willapa, Washington and put into port, but was a total loss.

=== 9 November ===
List of shipwrecks: 9 November 1904
Ship	State	Description
Wilson and Hunting	United States	The stores ship USS Culgoa rammed the 418 GRT schooner Wilson and Hunting off Barnegat Lighthouse, New Jersey, capsizing her. Four people aboard the schooner were killed; four were rescued; and one person aboard the steamship was injured.

=== 10 November ===
List of shipwrecks: 10 November 1904
Ship	State	Description
Ariel	United Kingdom	The 71-ton schooner lost wind and was driven ashore by the tide at Coltrock, near Berehaven, County Cork, Ireland, U.K. She was refloated by trawler "Bangkok" (United Kingdom) but filled and sank in 5 fathoms of water.
George T. Hope	United States	The steamer sprung a leak and sank at dock at Escanaba, Michigan. Raised, temporarily repaired and taken to Cleveland, Ohio for repairs.
Wm. Armstrong	United States	The railroad ferry attempted to leave dock in Ogdensburg, New York with two insecure loaded rail cars. One of them broke loose and rolled where it was dangling off the stern causing the ferry to begin filling with water. She was run onto the bar and sank in 14 feet (4.3 m) of water. Raised and repaired.

=== 11 November ===
List of shipwrecks: 11 November 1904
Ship	State	Description
John Denessen	United States	The steamer struck a log near the Red River near Green Bay, Wisconsin. She was beached in the Red River and was patched and refloated.

=== 12 November ===
List of shipwrecks: 12 November 1904
Ship	State	Description
Fanny H	United States	The pleasure yacht was destroyed by fire at St. Martin Island.
Wyoming	United States	The steamer sprang a leak and sank in Lake Huron eight miles (13 km) east of Burnt Cabin Point.

=== 13 November ===
List of shipwrecks: 13 November 1904
Ship	State	Description
C. T. No. 5	United States	The 177-gross register ton barge sank in Long Island Sound. The only person on board survived.
John Gregory	United States	The tug foundered in a gale and heavy seas in Lake Erie just off the breakwater at Cleveland, Ohio at the mouth of the Cuyahoga River. The harbor pilot and captain were killed.
Missouri	United States	The 15-gross register ton schooner sank in Pamlico Sound on the coast of North Carolina with the loss of all three people on board.
Stroini	Imperial Russian Navy	Russo-Japanese War, Siege of Port Arthur: The Kretchet-class destroyer struck an Imperial Russian Navy mine and sank in Korea Bay off Port Arthur, China.

=== 14 November ===
List of shipwrecks: 14 November 1904
Ship	State	Description
Penllyn	United States	The tow steamer sank at dock at Philadelphia, possibly her stern was caught under the dock with a rise in water level. Raised on 18 November and found to be undamageed. The vessel was back in service by 23 November.
Texas	United States	The barge was sunk in a collision with Dorchester (United States) at the entrance to the harbor of Providence, Rhode Island.

=== 15 November ===
List of shipwrecks: 15 November 1904
Ship	State	Description
Helen Barton	United States	The tug was sunk while tied up at the Ascension Coal Fleet Dock in Donaldsonville, Louisiana, when a coal boat struck her. She was a total loss.
Kitty Horr	United States	The 17-gross register ton schooner was stranded at Marco, Florida. The only person on board survived.

=== 16 November ===
List of shipwrecks: 16 November 1904
Ship	State	Description
Hunter Savidge	United States	The steamer was destroyed by fire at dock at Manistee, Michigan.
Rastoropni	Imperial Russian Navy	Russo-Japanese War: After her crew was put ashore, the Puiliki-class destroyer was blown up by her commanding officer at Chefoo, China, apparently to avoid any possibility of Imperial Japanese Navy forces entering the harbor and capturing her.
Ten Broeck	United States	The steamer was destroyed by fire at Cairo, Illinois.
Vidia M. Brigham	United States	The schooner was sunk in a collision with Walter A. Luckenbach (United States) six miles (9.7 km) off Cape Elizabeth, Maine. One crewman was lost, while the rest of the crew were rescued by Walter A. Luckenbach.

=== 17 November ===
List of shipwrecks: 17 November 1904
Ship	State	Description
Uncle Sam	United States	The laid up steamer burned to the water's edge at St. Louis, Missouri, probably a total loss.

=== 18 November ===
List of shipwrecks: 18 November 1904
Ship	State	Description
Mohawk	United States	The freighter burned off the Cornfield Lightship in Long Island Sound. One crewman killed. Survivors rescued by Boston (United States).

=== 19 November ===
List of shipwrecks: 19 November 1904
Ship	State	Description
Cairnavon	Flag unknown	Cairnavon The steamship sank.
Laura	Canada	The schooner was wrecked off Mushaboom Point, Sheet Harbour, Nova Scotia.
Philip Minch	United States	The steamer burned in Lake Erie 8 miles (13 km) east of Marblehead, Ohio and was abandoned by her crew who made it to shore in her boats. She sank in 45 feet (14 m) of water 6 miles (9.7 km) east of Chickenole Reef, 8 miles off Middle Island.

=== 21 November ===
List of shipwrecks: 21 November 1904
Ship	State	Description
J. N. Harbin	United States	The steamer struck a snag and sank at Bickers Landing in the Arkansas River. Raised and repaired.

=== 22 November ===
List of shipwrecks: 22 November 1904
Ship	State	Description
Marie	United States	The tug sank at dock overnight in East Boston, Massachusetts due to an open syphon pipe. Later raised.
Valora	United States	The tug sank in a collision with the tug Annie (United States) near the wharf in East Boston, Massachusetts.

=== 23 November ===
List of shipwrecks: 23 November 1904
Ship	State	Description
City of Seattle	United States	The steamer struck an uncharted rock in Eagle River Harbor and was beached. Repaired quickly and proceeded on its way.
Joe Seay	United States	The tug capsized and sank near Vicksburg, Mississippi. Total loss. One crewman killed.

=== 24 November ===
List of shipwrecks: 24 November 1904
Ship	State	Description
Kongo	United States	The steamer struck an obstruction leaving dock at Au Sable, twisting her stern post, she filled and sank.
Massasoit	United States	The 842-gross register ton schooner barge or scow barge was stranded at Waterworks Crib on the Niagara River in New York. All six people aboard survived.
Wm. Henry	United States	The 52-gross register ton schooner was stranded at Old Point, Virginia. All three people aboard survived.

=== 26 November ===
List of shipwrecks: 26 November 1904
Ship	State	Description
Marie	United States	The launch was sunk in a collision with the steamer P. R. R. No. 32 (United States) in the East River in New York City.

=== 28 November ===
List of shipwrecks: 28 November 1904
Ship	State	Description
Kelsey	United States	The 203-gross register ton barge sank at New York City. The only person on board survived.
Thos. White	United States	The steamer burned in the Calumet River due to a lamp exploding in her engine room. She was a total loss.

=== 29 November ===
List of shipwrecks: 29 November 1904
Ship	State	Description
B. W. Blanchard	United States	The steamer ran aground and was wrecked on North Point on the coast of Michigan in a blinding snowstorm on Lake Huron while towing the schooner barge John T. Johnson (United States) and broke up. Her wreck lies in 9 feet (2.7 m) of water at 45.021183°N 83.262717°W.
John Kilderhouse	United States	The schooner barge ran aground on North Point on the coast of Michigan in a blinding snowstorm on Lake Huron while following the steamer B. W. Blanchard and schooner barge John T. Johnson (both United States). She later was pulled off the rocks and recovered.
John T. Johnson	United States	The schooner barge ran aground and was wrecked on North Point on the coast of Michigan in a blinding snowstorm on Lake Huron while under tow by the steamer B. W. Blanchard (United States) and broke up. Her wreck lies in 7 feet (2.1 m) of water at 45.02165°N 83.262017°W.
Minnie	United States	The laid-up steamer burned to the waterline at Thornley's Landing, West Virginia, and sank.

=== 30 November ===
List of shipwrecks: 30 November 1904
Ship	State	Description
Columbia	United States	The 41-ton, 60-foot (18.3 m) schooner was driven ashore in "McLeods Bay" – probably a reference to McLeod Harbor (59°53′N 147°15′W) – on the coast of Montague Island on the south-central coast of the District of Alaska. Her crew of four survived, but she was a total loss.
Saien	Imperial Japanese Navy	Russo-Japanese War, Siege of Port Arthur: The protected cruiser struck a mine and sank in three minutes with the loss of 38 lives in the Gulf of Pechili between Pigeon Bay and Louisa Bay at 38°51′N 121°05′E, 1 nautical mile (1.9 km; 1.2 mi) off the coast of the Liaotung Peninsula, Manchuria, China.

=== Unknown date ===
List of shipwrecks: Unknown date in November 1904
Ship	State	Description
Ann Virginia	United States	The schooner sank in the Cohansey River, New Jersey sometime in November. The wreck was removed with dynamite, with the work completed by 13 June 1905.
Rex	United States	With no one on board, the 18-gross register ton scow was stranded at Bellingham, Washington.
Slieve Bawn	United Kingdom	The full-rigged ship was wrecked at Baira Rio Contas, Chile.

== December ==
=== 2 December ===
List of shipwrecks: 2 December 1904
Ship	State	Description
Dixie	United States	The steamer struck a hidden obstruction in fog and sank three miles (4.8 km) below Fort Adams, Mississippi.

=== 3 December ===
List of shipwrecks: 3 December 1904
Ship	State	Description
Santiago	United States	The 1,918-gross register ton schooner barge or scow barge at anchor and without lights was lost when struck by screw steamer Philadelphia (United States) at 2:50 A.M. in heavy rain off the Delaware Breakwater north of Cape Henlopen, Delaware. All four people aboard were rescued by boats from Philadelphia.

=== 4 December ===
List of shipwrecks: 4 December 1904
Ship	State	Description
Gustavo	United States	The 12-gross register ton sloop sank at Salinas, Puerto Rico. Both people on board survived.

=== 5 December ===
List of shipwrecks: 5 December 1904
Ship	State	Description
Poltava	Imperial Russian Navy	Japanese postcard of Poltava sunk at Port Arthur. Russo-Japanese War, Siege of Port Arthur: The Poltava-class battleship was set afire by five hits from Imperial Japanese Army artillery and sank in shallow water at Port Arthur, Manchuria, China, after the magazine for her 12-inch (305 mm) guns exploded, blowing a hole in her bottom. The Japanese refloated and repaired her and put into service as Tango (Imperial Japanese Navy).

=== 6 December ===
List of shipwrecks: 6 December 1904
Ship	State	Description
Retvizan	Imperial Russian Navy	Retvizan sunk at Port Arthur. Russo-Japanese War, Siege of Port Arthur: The battleship was sunk in shallow water at Port Arthur, Manchuria, China, by Imperial Japanese Army artillery fire. The Japanese refloated and repaired her and put into service as Hizen (Imperial Japanese Navy).

=== 7 December ===
List of shipwrecks: 7 December 1904
Ship	State	Description
Pearl	United States	The 87-gross register ton, 95.5-foot (29.1 m) schooner departed San Francisco, California, bound for Sanak Island in the Sanak Islands subgroup of the Fox Islands group of the Aleutian Islands with 28 fisherman and a crew of eight aboard and was never heard from again. Many months later, the schooner John F. Miller (United States) found evidence of her wreck on a reef northeast of Caton Island (54°23′30″N 162°25′30″W) in the Sanak Islands.
Peresvet	Imperial Russian Navy	Peresvet after scuttling. Russo-Japanese War, Siege of Port Arthur: After suffering damage from Imperial Japanese Army artillery fire over the course of several weeks, the Peresvet-class battleship was scuttled in shallow water at Port Arthur, Manchuria, China. The Japanese refloated and repaired her and put into service as Sagami (Imperial Japanese Navy).
Pobeda	Imperial Russian Navy	Pobeda (right) and the protected cruiser Pallada after they were sunk at Port Arthur. Russo-Japanese War Siege of Port Arthur: The Peresvet-class battleship was sunk in shallow water at Port Arthur, Manchuria, China, by Imperial Japanese Army artillery fire. The Japanese refloated and repaired her and put into service as Suwo (Imperial Japanese Navy).

=== 8 December ===
List of shipwrecks: 8 December 1904
Ship	State	Description
Gilyak	Imperial Russian Navy	Russo-Japanese War, Siege of Port Arthur: The gunboat was sunk at Port Arthur, Manchuria, China, by Imperial Japanese Army artillery fire.
Pallada	Imperial Russian Navy	Pallada (left) and the battleship Pobeda after they were sunk at Port Arthur. Russo-Japanese War Siege of Port Arthur: The Pallada-class protected cruiser was sunk in shallow water at Port Arthur, Manchuria, China, by Imperial Japanese Army artillery fire. The Japanese refloated and repaired her and put into service as Tsugaru (Imperial Japanese Navy).

=== 9 December ===
List of shipwrecks: 9 December 1904
Ship	State	Description
Bayan	Imperial Russian Navy	Russo-Japanese War, Siege of Port Arthur: The Bayan-class armored cruiser was sunk at her moorings at Port Arthur, Manchuria, China, by Imperial Japanese Army artillery fire. The Japanese refloated and repaired her and put into service as Aso (Imperial Japanese Navy).
Young Walker	United Kingdom	The 70.4-foot (21.5 m) trawling ketch sprang a leak in a gale. The crew were taken off by Innisfallen (United Kingdom) and the ship abandoned 9–10 miles (14–16 km) north of Great Orme's Head. The next day she was spotted by Abertawe (United Kingdom) 30 miles (48 km) west northwest of the North West Lightship, and not seen again.

=== 10 December ===
List of shipwrecks: 10 December 1904
Ship	State	Description
Antverpia	Belgium	The G Albrecht cargo ship ran aground on the River Scheldt. She was refloated in 1905 and scrapped in Antwerp.

=== 11 December ===
List of shipwrecks: 11 December 1904
Ship	State	Description
Jessie	United States	While she was under tow in the waters of the District of Alaska from Ketchikan to Niblack with a cargo of 60 tons of lumber and shingles, the 44-ton scow's towline parted and she drifted ashore on the coast of Prince of Wales Island in the Alexander Archipelago in Southeast Alaska somewhere near Chasina Point (56°16′50″N 132°01′30″W), 2 nautical miles (3.7 km; 2.3 mi) north of Wedge Island (55.1472222°N 131.9647222°W). She broke up on the rocks.

=== 12 December ===
List of shipwrecks: 12 December 1904
Ship	State	Description
Continental	United States	The steamer was wrecked on the coast of Wisconsin one mile (1.6 km) north of Twin River Point Light in Lake Michigan in a blinding snowstorm after she was disabled in heavy seas. She broke in two, a total loss. Her crew of 20 survived. Her wreck lies in 15 feet (4.6 m) of water at 44°13.932′N 087°30.462′W, within the boundaries of the Wisconsin Shipwreck Coast National Marine Sanctuary.
Flora	United States	The tug struck a sand bar at Kellogg's Landing, capsized and sank in ten feet (3.0 m) of water.

=== 13 December ===
List of shipwrecks: 13 December 1904
Ship	State	Description
Takasago	Imperial Japanese Navy	Russo-Japanese War, Siege of Port Arthur: The protected cruiser struck a mine and sank at Port Arthur, Manchuria, China (38°10′N 121°15′E). A total of 273 crew were killed.

=== 14 December ===
List of shipwrecks: 14 December 1904
Ship	State	Description
John Dexter	United States	The 24-gross register ton schooner was stranded in East Bay on the Pembroke River in Maine. All four people on board survived.
No. 53	Imperial Japanese Navy	Russo-Japanese War, Siege of Port Arthur: The torpedo boat was sunk off Port Arthur, Manchuria, China, during an attack on the battleship Sevastopol (Imperial Russian Navy).

=== 15 December ===
List of shipwrecks: 15 December 1904
Ship	State	Description
Baker	United States	The coal barge sprang a leak and sank at Pier 2, South wharves, Philadelphia, Pennsylvania.
No. 42	Imperial Japanese Navy	Russo-Japanese War, Siege of Port Arthur: During an attack on the battleship Sevastopol (Imperial Russian Navy), the No. 39-class torpedo boat was sunk off Port Arthur, Manchuria, China, by the destroyer Serdity (Imperial Russian Navy).
Vsadnik	Imperial Russian Navy	Russo-Japanese War, Siege of Port Arthur: The torpedo gunboat was sunk at Port Arthur, Manchuria, China, by Imperial Japanese Army artillery fire. The Japanese refloated and repaired her and commissioned her into service as Makikumo (Imperial Japanese Navy).

=== 16 December ===
List of shipwrecks: 16 December 1904
Ship	State	Description
Glen Island	United States	The passenger ship — a 238-foot (73 m), 328-gross register ton sidewheel paddle steamer — burned in Long Island Sound at a location identified both as east of Execution Light and as off Glen Cove, New York, inside of Mantinecock Point, about 100 yards (91 m) offshore. Two passengers and seven crew were killed. Her 21 survivors escaped in her lifeboats. She sank in 15 to 25 feet (4.6 to 7.6 m) of water.
Storozhevoi	Imperial Russian Navy	Russo-Japanese War, Siege of Port Arthur: The Kretchet-class destroyer was torpedoed by an Imperial Japanese Navy torpedo boat at Port Arthur, Manchuria, China, and beached.

=== 18 December ===
List of shipwrecks: 18 December 1904
Ship	State	Description
Amur	Imperial Russian Navy	Amur Russo-Japanese War: Siege of Port Arthur: The minelayer was sunk by Imperial Japanese Army 11-inch (279 mm) howitzers while drydocked at Port Arthur, Manchuria, China.
Laura	United States	The tow steamer sank at dock at Pier 63, Philadelphia, Pennsylvania, when her guard was caught under the dock during a rise in the water level.

=== 19 December ===
List of shipwrecks: 19 December 1904
Ship	State	Description
Lime Rock	United States	The freighter sank in the East River while tied up at Pier 3 after probably being damaged by ice while en route from South Amboy, New Jersey. Later raised.

=== 22 December ===
List of shipwrecks: 22 December 1904
Ship	State	Description
Robert E. Lee	United States	The steamer struck a stump and sank between Memphis, Tennessee and Ashport, Tennessee, or sank off Craighead Point, or Saighead Point, Arkansas during a rising of the river level.

=== 24 December ===
List of shipwrecks: 24 December 1904
Ship	State	Description
Iron Duke	United States	The laid-up steamer burned to the waterline at Charlotte, New York around midnight.
Unidentified scow	United States	The scow, under tow by the steamer Charles E. Matthews (United States), sank in a collision with Umbria (United Kingdom) off New York City.

=== 25 December ===
List of shipwrecks: 25 December 1904
Ship	State	Description
Drumelzier	United Kingdom	During a voyage from New York City to Swansea, Wales, with a cargo of copper, steel, oil, lead ingots, and a luxury automobile, the 3,625-gross register ton steam cargo ship was wrecked during a snowstorm on the bar about 0.75 nautical miles (1.4 km; 0.9 mi) off Fire Island off the south coast of Long Island, New York. Her entire crew of 30 survived. She broke up during a gale on 28–29 December, and her wreck sank in 20 feet (6 m) of water. Her wreck became known as the "Fire Island Wreck" and the "Quadrant Wreck."
Rees Pritchard	United States	The steamer burned while docked on the Yazoo River at Yazoo City, Mississippi. She was declared a total loss.

=== 26 December ===
List of shipwrecks: 26 December 1904
Ship	State	Description
Bobr	Imperial Russian Navy	Russo-Japanese War, Siege of Port Arthur: The Sivuch-class gunboat, already badly damaged by Imperial Japanese Army artillery and then stripped and demolished by her crew, was sunk by additional hits by Japanese artillery.

=== 27 December ===
List of shipwrecks: 27 December 1904
Ship	State	Description
Lesnoy	United States	The 8-gross register ton, 35-foot (10.7 m) schooner was wrecked during a gale on the northwest end of Wosnesenski Island in the Shumagin Islands off the south coast of the Alaska Peninsula.
Northeastern	United States	The steamer was wrecked and broke up on shoals near Cape Hatteras due to navigation errors during a gale with rain and high seas.
Two Brothers	United States	The 10-gross register ton schooner was lost when she collided with the screw steamer Cambridge (United States) in the Chesapeake Bay off Claiborne, Maryland. All five people on board survived.

=== 30 December ===
List of shipwrecks: 30 December 1904
Ship	State	Description
Lom	Norway	The three masted schooner wrecked at Terschelling, the Netherlands. The captain was killed, the other crew members were rescued. The wreck was found by divers in 1983.

=== Unknown date ===
List of shipwrecks: Unknown date December 1904
Ship	State	Description
Alice M	United States	During a voyage in the waters of the District of Alaska from Juneau to Kayak Island with a cargo of 11 tons of merchandise, the 13-ton schooner was wrecked during a gale on a sandbar behind "Kanuck Island" – probably a reference to Kanak Island (60°08′N 144°21′W) in Controller Bay (60.0770°N 144.2178°W) – on the coast of Southcentral Alaska. All six people aboard – three passengers and three crewmen – abandoned ship and survived, but Alice M soon was refloated by the rising tide, drifted out to sea, and sank.
Highland Lassie	United Kingdom	The Nelson Line steamer sailed from Swansea, Wales on 10 December 1904 for Buenos Aires and was not seen again; she was formally declared missing on 23 May 1905.
Texas	United States	The US Army Corps of Engineers Dredge broke up and sank off Galveston, Texas.

== Unknown date ==
List of shipwrecks: Unknown date in 1904
Ship	State	Description
Anna Evans	United States	The 6-gross register ton schooner sank in Mobjack Bay on the coast of Virginia. All three people on board survived.
Australia	United Kingdom	Australia The steamship was destroyed by fire at Port Phillip Heads, Victoria, Australia.
Conemaugh	Belgium	The steamer disappeared after leaving Coronel, Chile, bound for Sainta Lucia in the West Indies.
Laura	Italy	The sailing ship went missing after leaving Newcastle, New South Wales on 1 February for Tocopilla.
Maharaja	Hong Kong	The cargo ship was wrecked.
Maid of Patuca	United States	With no one on board, the 84-gross register ton screw steamer was lost in Honduras. Sources disagree on whether she sank in the Patuca River on 13 September or was blown out to sea by a hurricane on 1 October and dashed to pieces on a bar offshore.
Norseman	United States	The 7-gross register ton sloop was stranded at South Orrington, Maine. The only person on board survived.
Sir Wilfred		The dredge sank off Port Hope, Ontario sometime in 1904.
