= Penfield Reef =

Coordinates: 41.117°N 73.235°W

Penfield Reef is a partially submerged reef that extends a mile into Long Island Sound from the coast of Fairfield, Connecticut. The reef is one of the most dangerous areas of Long Island Sound and continues to menace boaters despite the presence of the Penfield Reef Lighthouse. The area was a peninsula a few centuries ago, gradually worn down to a series of islands and eventually to a shoal. Sand and stones collected from the reef for use as ballast on ships contributed to the rapid erosion. Cows once grazed on the peninsula, and two of the groups of rocks were later named "Cows" and "Calves" in recognition of the early history. The reef is known as an ideal fishing spot for bluefish, flounder and striped bass. It was the site of the first civilian (and also the first winch) helicopter rescue.
