= SV Lom =

Norwegian schooner (1891–1904)

History

Norway
- Name: Lom
- Owner: Axel Smith, Arendal
- Builder: A. Aanonsen, Arendal
- Completed: 1891
- Out of service: 30 December 1904
- Identification: Call sign: HTSR
- Fate: ran aground and wrecked at Noordsvaarder, the Netherlands

General characteristics
- Tonnage: 546 BRT
- Length: 39.6 m (129 ft 11 in)
- Beam: 9.1 m (29 ft 10 in)
- Height: 4.1 m (13 ft 5 in)
- Sail plan: three masts
- Crew: 10

SV Lom was an 1891-built, 40-metre (131 ft 3 in) long Norwegian three-masted wooden schooner. It was owned by Axel Smith from Arendal.

In December 1904 the full-rigged ship was driven ashore and wrecked on Terschelling, the Netherlands. The coxswain drowned, and the nine other crew members were rescued.

The hull of the ship and the cargo was sold on Terschelling.

In 1983 the wreck was rediscovered. Multiple items and a part of the ship was salvaged.

== Ship details ==
Lom was built in 1891 and was a three masted wooden schooner. The ship was 39.6 metres (129 ft 11 in) long and had a width of 9.1 m (29 ft 10 in) and a height of 4.1 m (13 ft 5 in). She weighed 546 BRT. She had call sign HTSR.

== History ==
The ship was built in 1891 by A. Aanonsen in Arendal for Axel Smith from Arendal. She was used as an intercontinental cargo vessel.

=== Fate ===
In 1904 she was en voyage from Paysandú/Brazil to Hamburg, Germany with a cargo of bone ash under command of J.S. Nielsen. On 29 December she sailed at Dungeness, United Kingdom. The next day on 30 December 1904 the ship ran aground and wrecked at Noordsvaarder, the Netherlands. Coxswain Carl Gunderson drowned. The other 9 crew members went in their own rowing boat and were rescued by tug SS “De Hoop”. Also the tug “Neptunus” went to the ship to help. The ship was almost immediately considered lost.

==== Aftermath ====
Due to the cargo of bones, the ship on Terschelling soon had the nickname (in Frisian) of 'bonkeschip' (translated: bone ship).

On 12 January a public sale was organized at Terschelling where the hull of the ship and the cargo of bone ash was sold. It was bought by D. Duijf for a total amount of f173.

== Wreck rediscovery ==
The wreck was discovered in 1983. Divers found Norwegian ceramics and horns of cattle. The stern was salvaged and is now part of a museum on Terschelling. A year later, the ship was again completely covered in sand and has as of 2010 never emerged again.
