= Penfield Reef Light =

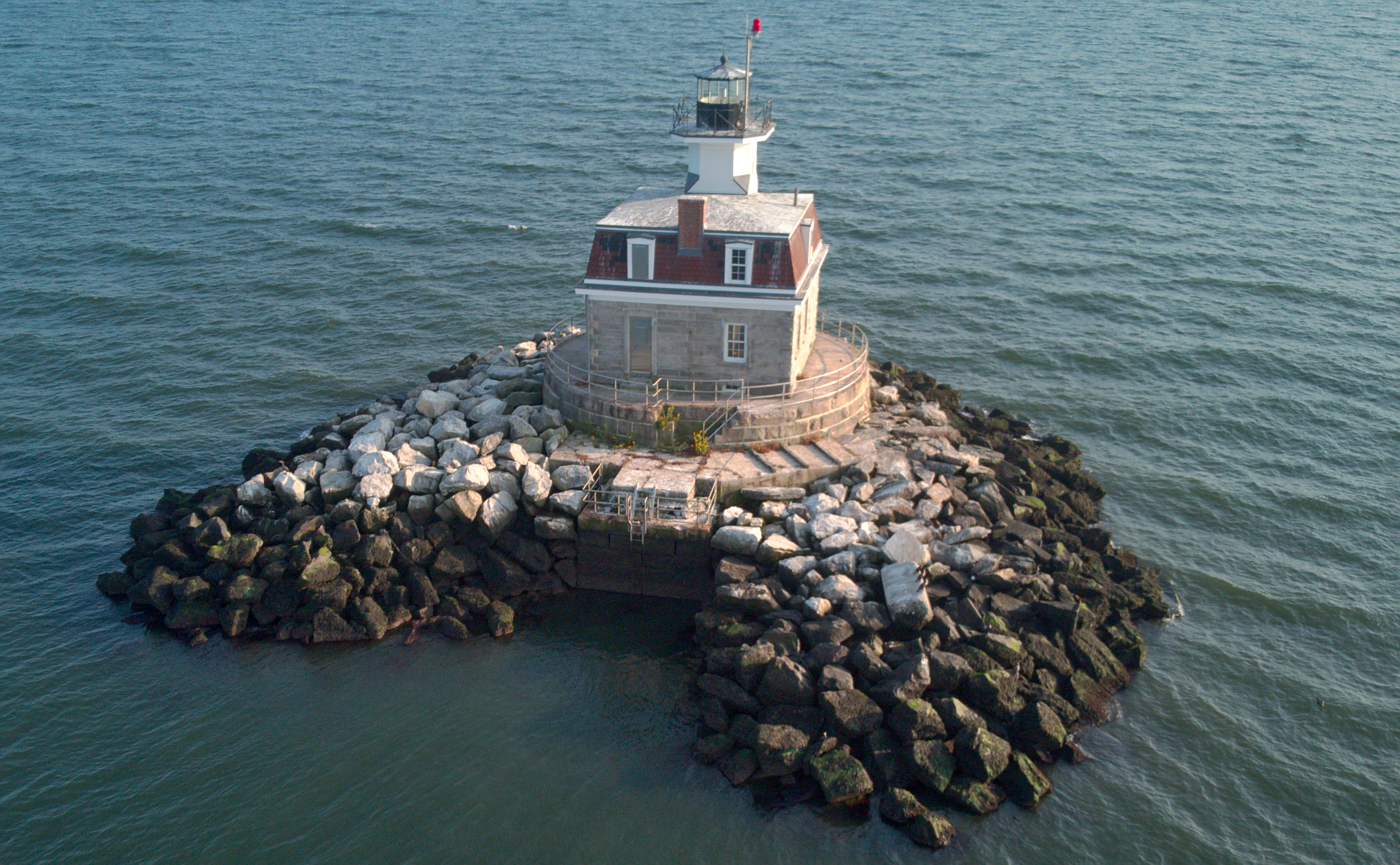
- Penfield Reef Light in 2019
- Location: Fairfield County, United States
- Coordinates: 41°07′01″N 73°13′19″W

Tower
- Constructed: 1874
- Construction: granite (caisson), wood (tower), granite (lighthouse keeper's house)
- Automated: 1971
- Height: 35 ft (11 m)
- Shape: octagon
- Markings: White (tower), black (lantern)
- Power source: solar power
- Operator: United States Coast Guard
- Heritage: National Register of Historic Places listed place
- Fog signal: 1 blast every 15s.

Light
- Focal height: 51 ft (16 m)
- Lens: fourth order Fresnel lens (–Unknown), VRB-25 (Unknown–)
- Range: 15 nmi (28 km; 17 mi)
- Characteristic: Fl R 6s
- Penfield Reef Lighthouse
- U.S. National Register of Historic Places
- Location: Bridgeport, Connecticut
- Area: 0.2 acres (0.081 ha)
- Architectural style: Second Empire
- MPS: Operating Lighthouses in Connecticut MPS
- NRHP reference No.: 89001473
- Added to NRHP: September 27, 1990

Penfield Reef Lighthouse is a lighthouse in Connecticut, United States, on Penfield Reef at the south side of Black Rock Harbor entrance on the Long Island Sound, off the coast of Fairfield, Connecticut. Constructed in 1874, it was one of the last offshore masonry lights. Most offshore lights built after this were cast iron towers built on cylindrical cast iron foundations.

Penfield Reef has been called one of the most treacherous areas of western Long Island Sound. The structure is about 1.1 miles (1.8 km) off Fairfield Beach, on one end of the reef.

Penfield Reef is one of several lighthouses built in the Second Empire style, with a wood frame tower integrated into the keeper's dwelling. The lighthouse consists of a 1-1/2 story keeper's quarters with a mansard roof, with a wood frame tower built into the roof framing. The dwelling is built of granite ashlar with brick back up, and heavy timber framing. Iron flat plates are anchored into the granite at spaced intervals to reinforce the walls. The foundation system is a cylindrical granite block caisson with a concrete core, surrounded by ledge.

== History ==
The Penfield Reef Light was constructed in 1874. The light is an active aid to navigation.

=== Haunting ===
On December 22, 1916. Lighthouse Keeper Frederick A. Jordan (sometimes spelled Jordon) rowed a dory for the mainland, to join his family for Christmas. The sea was rough, and about 150 yards (140 m) northwest of the lighthouse, the boat capsized. Assistant Keeper Rudolph Iten said he was unable to launch a boat against a strong wind and an outgoing tide, and so he could only witness Jordan's disappearance into the water. Jordan's body was soon recovered, and Iten was absolved of blame for the death and became the next keeper.

Environmental psychologists theorize that older, secluded buildings like the Penfield Reef Lighthouse are more likely to be perceived to be haunted. Nevertheless, according to a local legend, Jordan has haunted the place ever since. Iten wrote in the keeper's log that Jordan's ghost appeared two weeks later. Iten wrote that the ghost floated down the tower's stairs before dissolving into the darkness, and Iten said he found the log opened to the page that recorded the man's death. Iten also said the Penfield light began "behaving strangely" when the ghost appeared.

Jeremy D'Entremont, author of The Lighthouses of Connecticut, said that since Iten had tried to save the man, the new keeper would be unlikely to make light of Jordan's death by fabricating a ghost tale. Other lighthouse keepers later said Jordan's ghost appeared to them, and Iten even got them to sign affidavits describing the apparitions.

In one tale, Jordan was said to have pulled two boys from the water in 1942 after their boat capsized near Penfield Light. The boys said a man rescued them, but they couldn't find him when they went to the lighthouse to thank him. The boys identified Jordan as their rescuer after seeing his picture, the story goes.

=== Late twentieth century to present ===
In 1969, the Coast Guard announced it would replace the lighthouse with a steel tower, but a public outcry led by then U.S. Reps. Lowell Weicker and Stewart B. McKinney persuaded the agency to back off. By 1971, the light was automated and, after 97 years, no longer needed a keeper.

The U.S. General Services Administration announced in 2007 that it was looking for someone to buy the lighthouse, and it would only charge a dollar for it. In January 2008 the town of Fairfield submitted a formal proposal to buy and maintain the lighthouse. The proposal included restoration and repairs which were estimated at $352,000 over 16 months.

On July 29, 2008, Beacon Preservation, Inc. () received notice from Dr. Janet Snyder Matthews, associate director of Cultural Resources for National Park Service, informing Beacon that it had submitted a "superior" application for Penfield Reef Light and had been recommended as the new owners of Penfield. However, following a dispute with the State of Connecticut about bottomlands, the lighthouse was ultimately not transferred to Beacon Preservation, Inc. It was subsequently listed for sale again by the GSA, but disputes over the State of Connecticut's claim to bottomlands (submerged land beneath the lighthouse) hampered the sale.

The lighthouse was added to the National Register of Historic Places as Penfield Reef Lighthouse in 1990.

After discovering structural problems in the tower, The Coast Guard repaired the lighthouse in 2002. The repairs, which also made the lighthouse weathertight, were designed by engineer Claudio Polselli, of the Coast Guard's Civil Engineering Unit Providence. As part of an unsuccessful proposal to assume ownership of the lighthouse, the Town of Fairfield, CT prepared a condition report in 2011 for the structure. The lighthouse foundation, structure and roofs were in good condition, according to the report, but the walkway around the lantern was in need of repairs. Other problems included asbestos tiles on the floor, lead paint on the walls, mold in some areas and decaying brick and mortar work in the basement. In 2012, Hurricane Sandy severely damaged and flooded the lighthouse, displacing windows, doors, siding and roofing.

In 2015, the Coast Guard executed a substantial rehabilitation project at the lighthouse, designed by architect Marsha Levy of the Coast Guard's Civil Engineering Unit Providence, to address the damage from Hurricane Sandy. Waves at least 12 feet high had struck the lighthouse, leaving areas open to the weather. Debris, including asbestos, was removed from the interior. At the exterior, new windows that matched the appearance of the historic windows were installed. New roofing was installed, and the built in gutter was rebuilt. Stonework was repaired and repointed. New trim and siding to match the appearance of the original materials were also installed. The structure was made weathertight. Building materials were brought to the site by barge and small craft.

The lighthouse was then listed for sale again by the GSA in 2016. A 2016 proposal to use the lighthouse as a columbarium failed, and the lighthouse was returned to the Coast Guard. The roof was damaged in 2018, while transfer of the property was undecided. In 2021, the US Government listed the lighthouse for sale again on the GSA website. In May 2023, the GSA again listed the lighthouse for sale.

The identity of the newest owner has not been made public.

== Head keepers ==
- George Tomlinson (1874 – 1876)
- Augustus W. Eddy (1876 – 1880)
- William Jones (1880 – 1882)
- Neil Martin (1882 – 1891)
- William H. Haynes (1891 – 1908)
- Elmer V. Newton (1908 – 1914)
- Frederick A. Jordan, Sr. (1914 – 1916)
- Rudolph Iten (1917 – 1919)
- Charles Reuter (1919 – 1920)
- Rudolph Iten (1920 – 1926)
- George Petzolt (at least 1936 – 1941)
- William A. Shackley (1941 – 1946)
- Jose Fernandez (1948 – 1953)
- John Chilly (at least 1958)
- Patrick Tomlinson (1968 - 1969)

== See also ==
- List of lighthouses in Connecticut
- List of lighthouses in the United States
- History of Bridgeport, Connecticut
- National Register of Historic Places listings in Bridgeport, Connecticut
- USS Mary Alice (SP-397) - sank near the lighthouse
