= Dalian Bay =

Bay in Dalian, China

Coordinates: 38°57′24″N 121°41′58″E

Chinese name
- Simplified Chinese: 大连湾
- Traditional Chinese: 大連灣
Transcriptions
Standard Mandarin
- Hanyu Pinyin: Dàlián Wān
Wu
- Romanization: Du^{去}lie^{平} Uae^{平}
Yue: Cantonese
- Jyutping: Daai^{6}lin^{4} Waan^{1}
Southern Min
- Hokkien POJ: Tāi-liân Oân

Korean name
- Hangul: 다롄만
- Hanja: 大連灣
Transcriptions
- Revised Romanization: Daryen Man

Japanese name
- Kanji: 大連湾
Transcriptions
- Romanization: Dairen Wan

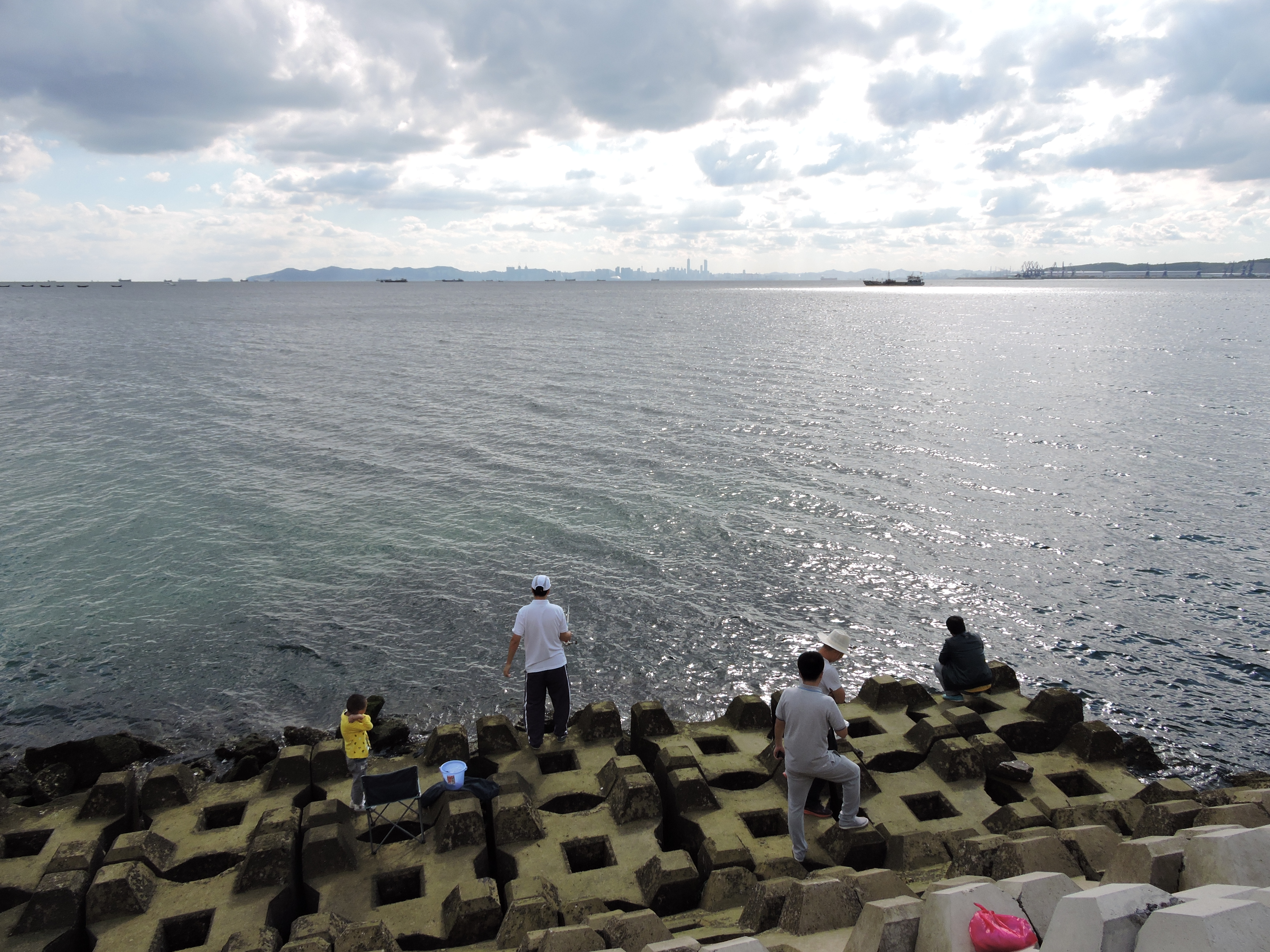
Dalian Bay

Dalian Bay (simplified Chinese: 大连湾; traditional Chinese: 大連灣; pinyin: Dàlián Wān), known historically as Talienwan, Talien-wan and Talien-hwan, is a bay on the southeast side of the Liaodong Peninsula of Northeast China, open to Korea Bay in the Yellow Sea in the east. The downtown area of Dalian City lies along the southern shore of the bay. The bay is ice-free year-round, while Jinzhou Bay on the other, northwest side of the peninsula is part of the Bohai Sea, and is shallow and closed by ice for four months of the winter.

== History ==
The bay was the rendezvous point for the British fleet for the 1860 assault on China during the Second Opium War. The consequent defeat of China led to the naval fortress at the extreme southern tip of the peninsula being named Port Arthur. The area is now the Lüshunkou District of Dailian City.

In 1879, about 20 small islands with their bays around Dalian were named Dalian Bay and barbettes (gun emplacements for military use) were subsequently built there. By the end of the First Sino-Japanese War of 1894–1895, most of the barbettes had been abandoned and a fishery industry was quickly established in their place. Now only six of the barbettes remain, and they are located on Monk Island (和尚岛; 和尚島). They were built between 1887 and 1893.

The Russian Empire coerced a lease of the bay from China in 1898 along with Port Arthur, which is 40 miles (64 km) away. The lease was transferred to the Empire of Japan in 1905 following the Russo-Japanese War.

Today, Dalian Bay has one of the biggest fishing ports in East Asia and it plays an essential role in the Chinese fishery industry. It has been a famous seafood distribution center since the 1930s, with thousands of people involved in commercial fishing coming to Dalian Bay for business.

== See also ==
- Port of Dalian
