= Showa/Nakajima L2D =

Japanese license-built version of Douglas DC-3

L2D
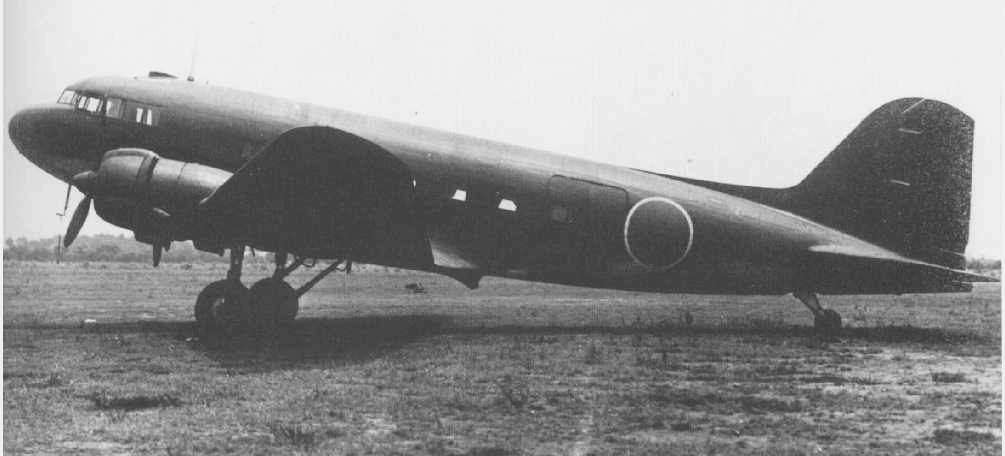
- Shōwa L2D3

General information
- Type: Airliner and transport aircraft
- Manufacturer: Nakajima and Showa Aircraft
- Number built: 487; 71× L2D2 by Nakajima all others by Shōwa

History
- Manufactured: 1940–1945
- Introduction date: 1939
- First flight: October 1939
- Developed from: Douglas DC-3

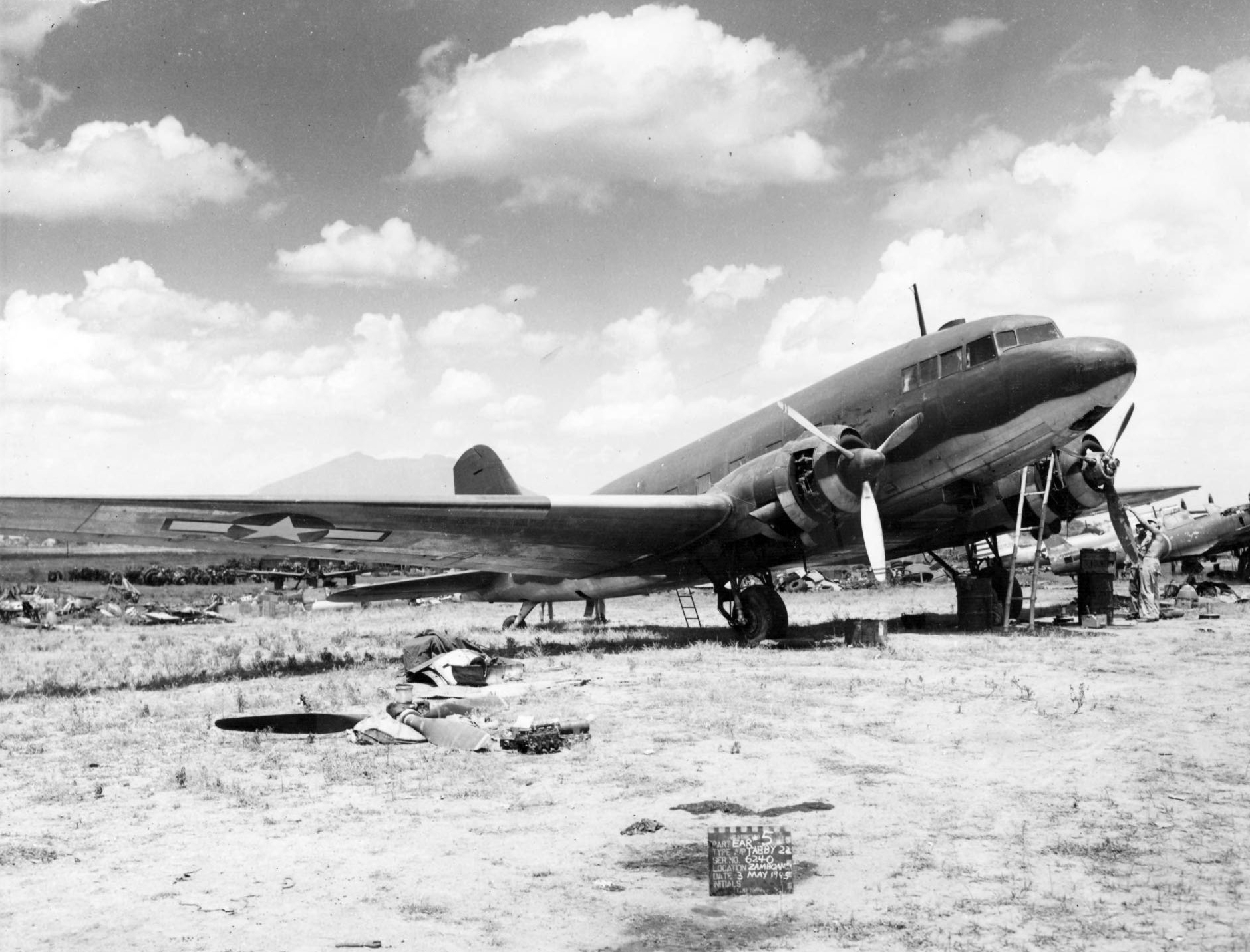
A captured Shōwa L2D3 or L2D3-L in US markings, Mindanao, Philippines, May 1945

The Shōwa L2D and Nakajima L2D, given the designations Shōwa Navy Type 0 Transport and Nakajima Navy Type 0 Transport(零式輸送機), were license-built versions of the Douglas DC-3. The L2D series, numerically, was the most important Japanese transport in World War II. The L2D was given the Allied code name Tabby.

== Design and development ==
After successful license production acquired in 1935 of the earlier Douglas DC-2, Nakajima Hikoki acquired the license rights for $90,000 in February 1938, to build the DC-3. Previously, the Great Northern Airways and the Far East Fur Trading Company had purchased 22 DC-3s from 1937 to 1939. This total consisted of 13 Cyclone powered DC-3s and nine Twin Wasp powered DC-3As, two of which were delivered unassembled and assigned to a relatively new concern, Shōwa Aircraft. Shōwa and Nakajima worked in concert to create a production series. Although the L2D was intended for both civil and military application, the production run was largely reserved for the Japanese military as the Navy Type 0 Transport.

The Nakajima prototype, powered by Pratt & Whitney SB3G radial engines, first flew in October 1939 and entered production in 1940 as the L2D1 with parts imported from the U.S. while the two Shōwa examples were being assembled to Japanese production standards to simplify manufacture. Differing in minor details, mainly due to the use of locally-produced Mitsubishi Kinsei 43 radial engines of similar power, the initial series from both companies were very similar to its Douglas antecedent.

Then Japanese engineered their own version, and by 1942, Nakajima had built, including the prototype, 71 L2D2 Navy Type 0 Transport Model 11s and then embarked on manufacturing combat aircraft of their own design. Shōwa, once their factory and production line was complete, built the next series, a total of 416 aircraft, including 75 cargo versions with the "barn doors" and reinforced floor, designated L2D2 1. The first Japanese military version was equipped with wide cargo doors, essentially mirroring the U.S. C-47, appearing about the same time. Other L2D variants, while normally unarmed, as L2D4 and L2D4-1 carried one flexible 13 mm Type 2 machine gun in a dorsal turret in the navigator's dome and two flexible 7.7 mm Type 92 machine guns that could be fired from fuselage hatches, but this armament configuration was not a production standard.

Although the Japanese civil versions were nearly identical to their Douglas equivalent, the military variants, while visually similar, were substantially different. The Kinsei 51/53 engines had 1,325 hp (975 kW) and featured enlarged nacelles and large propeller spinners, while the cockpit bulkhead was moved back 40 inches (100 cm) so all four crew members forward were in one compartment, with three extra windows added behind the cockpit. The most radical changes to the original design came about due to wartime exigencies in shortages of strategic materials, that led to metal components in less critical structural areas being replaced by wood. As many as 20 transports featured wooden rudders, stabilizers, ailerons, fins, elevators and entrance doors. An all-wood variant, the L2D5, was readied for production near the end of the war.

== Operational history ==
=== Imperial Japanese Navy ===
The original DC-3s operated by Dai Nippon Koku KK were pressed into Imperial service during the war, serving alongside the license-built L2Ds. The L2Ds served in the Southern Philippines' air groups (Kōkūtai) in squadrons (Buntai) attached to the 3rd, 4th, 6th, 11th, 12th, 13th, and 14th Air Fleets (Kōku Kantai) as well as the Combined Fleet (Rengō Kantai) and to the China Area and Southwest Area Fleets. With the large load capacity inherent in all L2D variants, the types were used in all Japanese theaters, as both a passenger and cargo transport, playing an important role in supply of the distant garrisons on the islands of Pacific Ocean and New Guinea. They were also adapted to serve as staff and communications aircraft, as well as in the maritime surveillance role. The future president of Indonesia, Sukarno, used an L2D2 during discussions regarding Indonesian independence with Japanese authorities in early 1945.

=== Captured ===
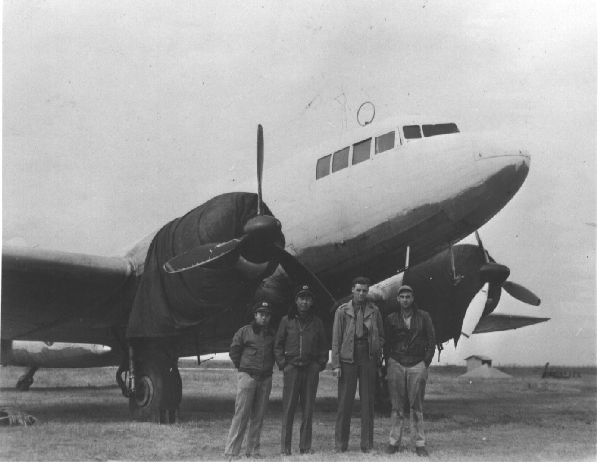
CNAC pilots with a captured Shōwa L2D3 or L2D3-L, c. 1945

At least one L2D was captured at Zamboanga airfield in May 1945 and later repaired and tested at Clark Field.

RAF Air Chief Marshal Sir Walter Cheshire was in charge of troop and supply airlift in South East Asia after Japan surrendered. Due to lack of resources available he was forced to make use of Japanese Air Force transport planes and aircrews, creating the RAF Gremlin Task Force (GTF). This included the use of L2D "Tabby" aircraft that supplemented RAF 118 Wing C-47 Dakota aircraft. Japanese aircraft retained their white surrender finish with large blue and white SEAC roundels painted over the green surrender crosses.

In 1945 in the Dutch East Indies (now Indonesia), after the capitulation of Japan, at least three L2D "Tabby" were captured on the Perak airfield (near Surabaya). They wore the marks of the Indonesian nationalists (a red and white stripe). As there was a great need for transportation, two Tabbies were (with the cooperation of the Indonesians) flown to Tjililitan near Batavia (now Jakarta). Since the condition of the planes was rather bad, the Dutch military decided not to use the planes any further. The third was flown to Medan on Sumatera, however there were oil-leaks and it had to make an emergency landing and was abandoned (see 'Japanese planes under Dutch command' by G.J. Tornij).

=== Post War ===
Relatively few of the Shōwa/Nakajima L2Ds survived the war, although at least one captured example was in service with the National Aviation Corporation (CNAC) during 1945, serving along with DC-3s acquired pre-war. In 1946, another captured L2D2 was used by the French VVS Group Transport 1/34 in military operations in Indochina. Postwar, other L2Ds were located in the Pacific as either crashed or abandoned aircraft, and none are known to exist today.

== Variants ==
L2D1 Navy D1 Transport (海軍D一号輸送機 Kaigun D1-Gō Yusōki)
Knock down production two DC-3s supplied for evaluation by the Imperial Japanese Navy Air Service.
L2D2 Type 0 Transport Model 11 (零式輸送機11型 Reishiki Yusōki 11-gata)
Personnel transports with Mitsubishi Kinsei 43 radials. Initial named Navy D2 Transport (海軍D二号輸送機 Kaigun D2-Gō Yusōki).
L2D2-L Type 0 Freighter Model 11 (零式荷物輸送機11型 Reishiki Nimotsu-Yusōki 11-gata)
Cargo version of the L2D2 with enlarged cargo door.
L2D3 Type 0 Transport Model 22 (零式輸送機22型 Reishiki Yusōki 22-gata)
L2D2 re-engined with Mitsubishi Kinsei 51, Kinsei 52 or Kinsei 53 engines, each at 1,300 hp (957 kW)–1,325 hp (975 kW). Increased side cockpit glass.
L2D3-L Type 0 Freighter Model 22 (零式荷物輸送機22型 Reishiki Nimotsu-Yusōki 22-gata)
Cargo version of the L2D3.
L2D3a Type 0 Transport Model 22A (零式輸送機22甲型 Reishiki Yusōki 22 Kō-gata)
Armed versions L2D3 with a 13 mm machine gun in a dorsal turret and two 7.7 mm machine guns in the left and right fuselage hatches.
L2D3a-L Type 0 Freighter Model 22A (零式荷物輸送機22甲型 Reishiki Nimotsu-Yusōki 22 Kō-gata)
Armed version of the L2D3-L, armaments were same as L2D3a.
L2D4 Type 0 Transport Model 23 (零式輸送機23型 Reishiki Yusōki 23-gata)
L2D3 re-engined with Mitsubishi Kinsei 62 engines, each at 1,590 hp (1,170 kW).
L2D4-L Provisional name Type 0 Freighter Model 23 (仮称零式荷物輸送機23型 Kashō Reishiki Nimotsu-Yusōki 23-gata)
Cargo version of the L2D4, prototype only.
L2D5 Provisional name Type 0 Transport Model 33 (仮称零式輸送機33型 Kashō Reishiki Yusōki 33-gata)
Wooden version, replacement of steel components with wood; used two Mitsubishi Kinsei 62 engines, incomplete.

== Operators ==
=== Civil ===
Republic of China

- CNAC

Empire of Japan

- Great Northern Airways
- Japan Air Transport
- Imperial Japanese Airways

=== Military ===
France

- French Air Force

Republic of China-Nanjing

- Nanjing air force

Empire of Japan

- Imperial Japanese Navy Air Service
- Fleet
  - Combined Fleet
  - 3rd Fleet
  - 4th Fleet
  - 1st Air Fleet
  - 3rd Air Fleet
  - 11th Air Fleet
  - 12th Air Fleet
  - 13th Air Fleet
  - 14th Air Fleet
  - 1st Mobile Fleet
  - Southwest Area Fleet
  - Southeast Area Fleet
  - Northeast Area Fleet
  - Central Pacific Area Fleet
  - 1st Southern Expeditionary Fleet
  - 2nd Southern Expeditionary Fleet
  - 3rd Southern Expeditionary Fleet
  - 4th Southern Expeditionary Fleet
  - China Area Fleet
  - General Escort Command
  - 1st Escort Fleet
- Air Flotilla and Naval Air Group
  - 12th Combined Air Group / 12th Air Flotilla
  - 21st Air Flotilla
  - 23rd Air Flotilla
  - 201st Naval Air Group
  - 203rd Naval Air Group
  - 256th Naval Air Group
  - 701st Naval Air Group
  - 901st Naval Air Group
  - 951st Naval Air Group
  - 1st Airlift Group / 1001st Naval Air Group
  - 1021st Naval Air Group
  - 1022nd Naval Air Group
  - 1023rd Naval Air Group
  - 1081st Naval Air Group
- Naval District and Guard District
  - Kure Naval District
  - Yokosuka Naval District
  - Sasebo Naval District
  - Ōminato Guard District
  - Takao Guard District
  - Chinkai Guard District
  - Kainantō Guard District

== Specifications (Shōwa L2D3-Ia) ==
Data from Japanese Aircraft of the Pacific War

General characteristics

- Crew: 3-5
- Capacity: 21 pax / 4,500 kg (9,921 lb) cargo
- Length: 19.507 m (64 ft 0 in)
- Wingspan: 18.956 m (62 ft 2 in)
- Height: 7.46 m (24 ft 6 in)
- Wing area: 91.6 m^{2} (986 sq ft)
- Airfoil: root: NACA 2215; tip: NACA 2206
- Empty weight: 7,218 kg (15,913 lb)
- Gross weight: 12,500 kg (27,558 lb)
- Powerplant: 2 × Mitsubishi MK8 Kinsei 43 14-cylinder air-cooled radial piston engine, 750 kW (1,000 hp) each for take-off

810 kW (1,080 hp) at 3,000 m (9,800 ft)

- Propellers: 3-bladed variable-pitch propellers

Performance

- Maximum speed: 393 km/h (244 mph, 212 kn) at 2,800 m (9,200 ft)
- Cruise speed: 241 km/h (150 mph, 130 kn) at 3,000 m (9,800 ft)
- Range: 3,000 km (1,900 mi, 1,600 nmi)
- Service ceiling: 10,500 m (34,400 ft) L2D2
- Time to altitude: 5,000 m (16,000 ft) in 16 minutes 2 seconds
- Wing loading: 136.5 kg/m^{2} (28.0 lb/sq ft)
- Power/mass: 0.1550 kW/kg (0.0943 hp/lb)

Armament

- Guns: 1x flexible 13 mm (0.512 in) Type 2 machine gun and 2x 7.7 mm (0.303 in) Type 92 machine guns (L2D4, L2D4-1 and L2D5)

== See also ==
Related development

- Douglas DC-3
- Douglas C-47 Skytrain
- Lisunov Li-2

Aircraft of comparable role, configuration, and era

- Curtiss C-46 Commando
- Fiat G.18
- Junkers Ju 52

Related lists

- List of civil aircraft
- List of aircraft of World War II
