= Ryūnosuke Kusaka =

Japanese admiral

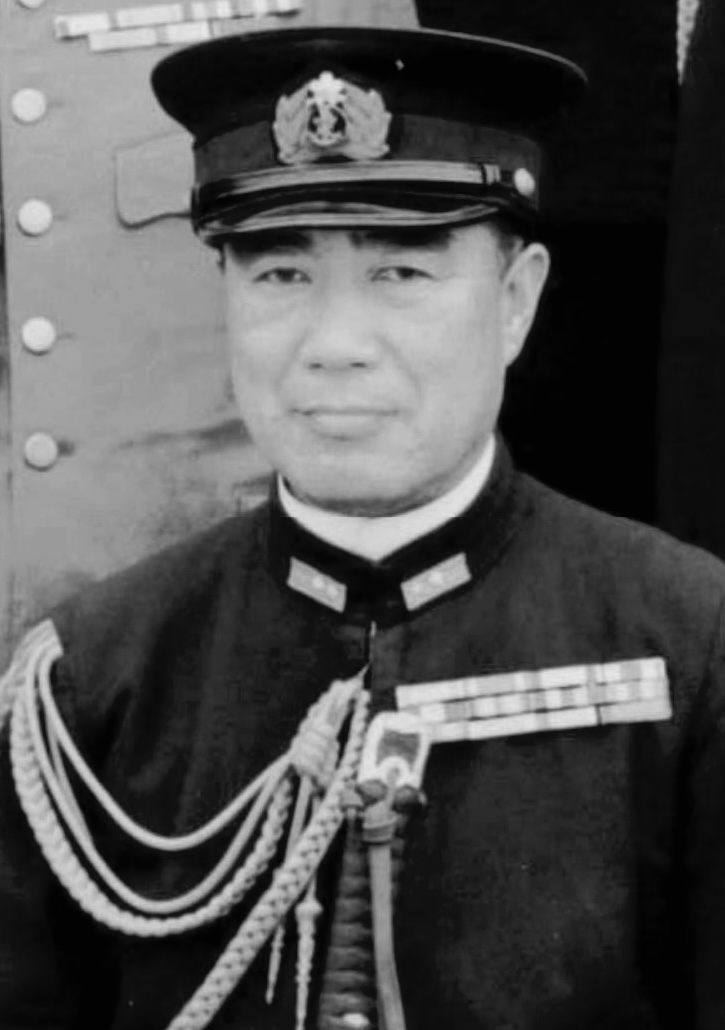
- Kusaka in 1944 as CoS of the Combined Fleet
- Native name: 草鹿 龍之介
- Born: 25 September 1893; Tokyo, Japan
- Died: 23 November 1971 (aged 78)
- Allegiance: Empire of Japan
- Branch: Imperial Japanese Navy
- Service years: 1913–1945
- Rank: Vice Admiral
- Commands: Hōshō; Akagi; 4th Combined Air Group; 24th Air Flotilla; Yokosuka Naval Air Group; 5th Air Fleet
- Conflicts: World War II; Pacific War; Attack on Pearl Harbor; Indian Ocean raid; Battle of Midway (WIA); Formosa Air Battle

Ryūnosuke Kusaka (草鹿 龍之介, Kusaka Ryūnosuke; 25 September 1893 – 23 November 1971) was an admiral in the Imperial Japanese Navy during World War II who served as Chief of Staff of the Combined Fleet. Fellow Admiral Jinichi Kusaka was his cousin. Kusaka was also the 4th Headmaster of Ittō Shōden Mutō-ryū Kenjutsu, a famous school of swordsmanship founded by Yamaoka Tesshū.

== Biography ==
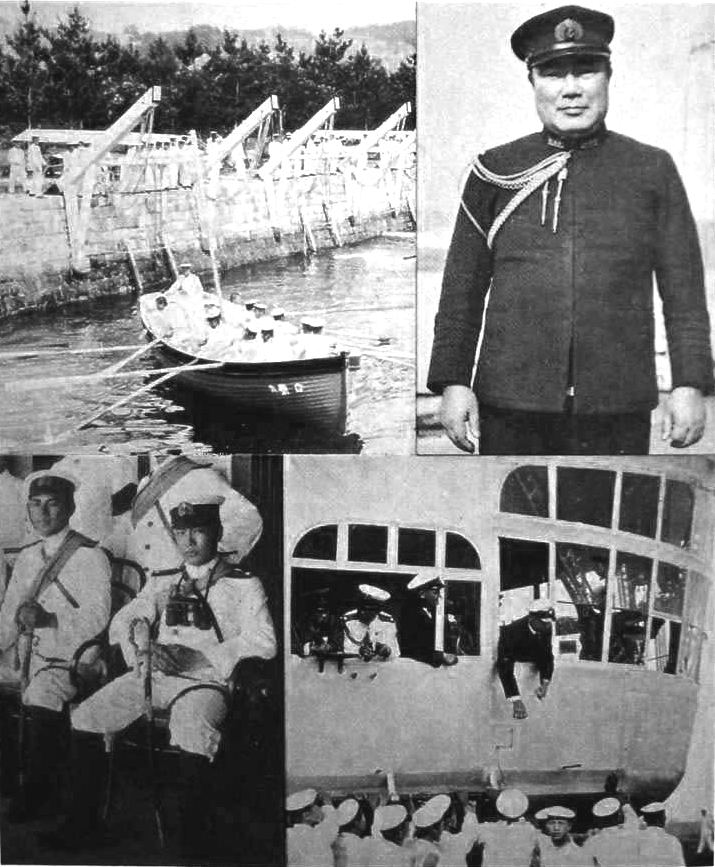
Photos with Ryūnosuke Kusaka

Born to a director of the Sumitomo zaibatsu in Tokyo in 1893, Kusaka's family registry officially listed him as a native of Ishikawa Prefecture, and he was schooled in Osaka.

He entered the 41st class of the Imperial Japanese Navy Academy graduating 14th out of a class of 118 in 1913 and graduating from the Naval Gunnery School in 1920. He did his midshipman service on the cruisers Azuma and Otowa. After he was commissioned as ensign, he was assigned to the battleship Kawachi and cruiser Yakumo. He later served on the battleship Kongō and destroyer Kuwa. After his promotion to lieutenant on 1 December 1919, he was assigned to the battleships Mutsu and Yamashiro, destroyer Susuki, and repair ship Kantō. He was promoted to lieutenant commander in 1925, and graduated from the Naval Staff College the same year, specializing in naval aviation. He subsequently captained a naval fighter group based at Kasumigaura and served in numerous staff positions.

On 1 September 1933, he was appointed executive officer of the cruiser Iwate, and on 16 November 1936—after his promotion to captain—he was given his first command: the aircraft carrier Hōshō. In 1939, he became captain of the aircraft carrier Akagi.

Promoted to rear admiral on 15 November 1940, he was commander of the 24th Air Flotilla before being appointed Chief of Staff of the 1st Air Fleet under Admiral Chūichi Nagumo in April 1941. He was involved in strategic and tactical planning and execution, including the attack on Pearl Harbor and Battle of Midway. Kusaka badly sprained both ankles and was burned during the evacuation from the critically damaged Akagi during the battle. During the aftermath of the battle, Kusaka was able to dissuade the fleet commander and senior officers from committing suicide after the Japanese defeat.

Kusaka remained with the fleet until November 1942, and accepted a number of staff positions thereafter. He was promoted to vice admiral on 1 May 1944 and transferred to the Combined Fleet as Chief of Staff under commander-in-chief Admiral Soemu Toyoda in November 1944. His final assignment was command of the 5th Air Fleet after the suicide of Matome Ugaki, exactly the day Japan surrendered to the Allies.

Kusaka was interviewed by Walter Lord and gave detailed accounts for the books Day of Infamy (1957) and Incredible Victory (1967).

== Portrayals ==
Kusaka was portrayed by Ichirō Ryūzaki in the 1970 film Tora! Tora! Tora!, by Pat Morita in the 1976 movie Midway, by Tatsuya Mihashi in the 1981 film Rengō Kantai (lit. "Combined Fleet", released in the United States as The Imperial Navy) and by Ryûzô Hayashi in Toei's 2005 film Otokotachi no Yamato.

Military offices
Preceded by Fukudome Shigeru	Combined Fleet; Chief-of-staff; 6 April 1944 - 24 June 1945	Succeeded by Yano Shikazō
