= L2D =

L2D may refer to:

- Showa/Nakajima L2D, a type of Japanese transportation aircraft derived from Douglas DC-3
- Live2D, a software, eponymous technology and company for 2D animation
