= Formosa Air Battle =

Part of the Pacific Theater of World War II

- Part of the Pacific Theater of World War II
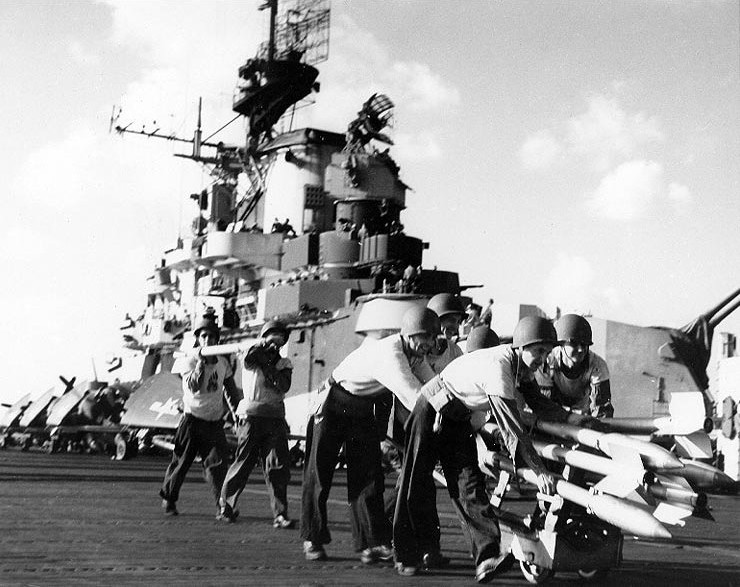
- Crewmen on USS Hancock (CV-19) move rockets to planes while preparing for strikes on Formosa, 12 October 1944.
Date	October 12–16, 1944
Location	Taiwan, Philippine Sea
Result	American victory

Belligerents
Japan	United States

Commanders and leaders
Ryūnosuke Kusaka; Shigeru Fukudome	William Halsey, Jr. Marc Mitscher

Units involved
(Empire of Japan) Navy Air Service: 1st Air Fleet; 2nd Air Fleet; 3rd Air Fleet; (Empire of Japan) Army Air Service: 4th Air Army	(United States) Third Fleet: Task Force 38; (United States) Twentieth Air Force: 58th Bombardment Wing

Strength
330 aircraft in Formosa, 350 in Kyushu, plus 690 flying in from bases in Japan and China over four days	9 fleet carriers 8 light carriers 6 battleships 4 heavy cruisers 11 light cruisers 57 destroyers ~1,000 carrier aircraft ~130 heavy bombers

Casualties and losses
321–525 aircraft Formosan military installations and infrastructure heavily damaged	89 aircraft 1 heavy cruiser seriously damaged 2 light cruisers damaged 1 destroyer damaged

The Formosa Air Battle (Japanese: 台湾沖航空戦, lit. 'Battle of the Taiwan Sea', Chinese: 臺灣空戰), 12–16 October 1944, was a series of large-scale aerial engagements between carrier air groups of the United States Navy Fast Carrier Task Force (TF 38) and Japanese land-based air forces of the Imperial Japanese Navy (IJN) and Imperial Japanese Army (IJA). The battle consisted of American air raids against Japanese military installations on Taiwan (then known to Westerners as Formosa) during the day and Japanese air attacks at night against American ships. Japanese losses exceeded 300 planes destroyed in the air, while American losses amounted to fewer than 100 aircraft destroyed and two cruisers damaged. This outcome effectively deprived the Japanese Navy's Combined Fleet of air cover for future operations, which proved decisive during the Battle of Leyte Gulf later in October.

== Background ==
Japanese strategic plans for a decisive battle with the U.S. fleet were already established by September 1944. Anticipating the various options open to American landing forces, the Japanese operational order, code named Sho ("victory"), envisioned four scenarios numbered from one to four. Sho-1 (Ichi), 2 (Ni), 3 (San), and 4 (Yon) were meant to defend respectively the Philippines, Formosa and Okinawa, the Japanese homeland, and Hokkaido plus the Kuril Islands.

Due to Japan's losses during the Battle of the Philippine Sea, the core of its air power for operation Sho was land-based. The plan also broke with IJN tradition by assigning overriding importance to sinking U.S. supply vessels rather than U.S. warships. To restore morale, the Commander-in-Chief of the Combined Fleet Admiral Soemu Toyoda flew out to the front in early October to rally the troops behind Sho.

The Japanese navy had formed a special air unit called the T Attack Force (T攻撃部隊, T Kōgeki Butai), the "T" short for "typhoon" (台風, taifū), to experiment with rough-weather training. This strategy, along with night operations and submarine warfare, was meant to compensate for Japan's smaller fleet compared to that of the United States by flying missions in weather conditions that the Americans were not trained for. However, like other Japanese units at the time, the T Attack Force suffered from a shortage of pilots, even after recruiting green fliers directly from the army. Their inexperience, compounded by carrying out missions at night, would later lead to poor performance and exaggerated kill counts during the actual battle.

By 10 October Toyoda's tour of the front was complete. He intended to depart from Formosa for Japan that same day but was forced to change his plans when Vice Admiral Marc Mitscher's Fast Carrier Task Force suddenly appeared to the north, launching strikes against the Ryukyu Islands. Toyoda could not risk a return trip home through a concentrated enemy carrier force that now embarked more than 1,000 aircraft, (Note: Per Wilmott p. 59, this is the first time that an American carrier force embarked such a large number of aircraft.) especially not after previous Combined Fleet commanders had been lost during aerial engagements. As a result, he was grounded far from Combined Fleet headquarters at a decisive moment. Out of position and with inadequate lines of communication, the response to such overwhelming enemy air power was left to Toyoda's Chief of Staff, Vice Admiral Ryūnosuke Kusaka.

Kusaka correctly saw these strikes as a precursor to U.S. troop landings, in part due to Imperial Navy intelligence collected over the previous week. Because he was still unsure exactly where enemy forces would land, he chose to execute the air component of Sho-1 or Sho-2 – the planned defense of the Philippines or Formosa, respectively – on the morning of 10 October. Sho was a complex plan involving multiple naval surface forces sortieing from bases as far away as Singapore and Japan. It would take these warships time to maneuver into position for a concerted attack. Rather than waiting for the arrival of the fleet for a combination of sea and air power, Kusaka ordered the air forces reserved for Sho to engage the enemy at once. He reinforced this order by implementing Sho-2 in full on the morning of 12 October.

Over 1,800 aircraft were allocated for Sho in total, but they were widely dispersed across the four operation regions. About one third of them were not battle-ready due to casualties and a lack of parts or trained pilots. When the fighting began, Vice Admiral Shigeru Fukudome had approximately 700 planes ready in Formosa and Kyushu. 100 or so aircraft in the Seto Inland Sea was later added to his command. Over the next four days, an additional 690 or so planes flew in from bases in Japan and China.

Although this represented a huge number of available aircraft, the Imperial Japanese Navy Air Service (IJNAS) was still recovering from losses suffered at the Battle of the Philippine Sea in June. While units were largely reconstituted in terms of quantity by this time, pilot quality was in clear decline. Moreover, though the overall number of planes committed to battle by 12 October dwarfed any force that Japan had previously fielded in the air, the U.S. Navy's Fast Carrier Force was capable of committing a much larger, significantly better-trained force. (Note: For size comparison of offensive forces, consider that, for example, Fukudome reported 761 sorties flown by the whole 2nd Air Fleet against TF 38 during the week of the battle, versus 808 target sorties flown by TG 38.2 alone between 11–14 October. See below Willmott p. 64 and Mitscher p. 30.)

== Order of battle ==
Imperial Japanese Navy

- Imperial Japanese Navy Air Service: over 1,200 fighters/bombers allocated for all four regions of operation Sho
  - 1st Air Fleet based in Manila, Philippines: 350 land-based planes
  - 2nd Air Fleet based in Kyushu and Takao, Taiwan: 510 land-based planes
  - 3rd Air Fleet: 300 land-based planes plus 100 diverted from carrier divisions
  - 12th Air Fleet based in Hokkaido and the Kuril Islands: fewer than 100 planes, for emergencies
  - 13th Air Fleet based in Malay and the Dutch East Indies: fewer than 100 planes, for emergencies

Imperial Japanese Army

- Imperial Japanese Army Air Service: approximately 600 planes allocated for all Sho regions
  - 4th Air Army based in Manila, Philippines: about 200 planes
  - Formosa Army based in Taihoku and Takao: about 200 planes
  - Homeland training forces: about 200 planes

Approximately one-third of the airframes allocated were unavailable due to casualties and a lack of parts or trained pilots. 720 planes were placed under Fukudome's unified command when the battle began, with 100 planes from the Seto Inland Sea added later on. The 330 based in Formosa were able to defend immediately. About 350 were still based in Kyushu and participated in attacks against the American fleet over water. Some 690 additional planes flew in from bases in Japan and China over the next four days.

United States Navy

- Third Fleet
  - Task Force 38 (TF 38): 17 aircraft carriers (including 8 light carriers and over 1,000 aircraft), 6 battleships, 4 heavy cruisers, 11 light cruisers, 57 destroyers
    - Task Group 38.1 (TG 38.1): USS Cowpens, USS Hornet, USS Monterey, USS Wasp
    - Task Group 38.2 (TG 38.2): USS Bunker Hill, USS Cabot (detached), USS Hancock, USS Independence, USS Intrepid
    - Task Group 38.3 (TG 38.3): USS Essex, USS Langley, USS Lexington, USS Princeton
    - Task Group 38.4 (TG 38.4): USS Belleau Wood, USS Enterprise, USS Franklin, USS San Jacinto

United States Army Air Forces

- Twentieth Air Force
  - 58th Bombardment Wing

== Battle ==
On 9 October, a Japanese patrol plane was lost to the east of Okinawa. On 10 October, American forces conducted an air raid over the islands. Throughout the day and night of 11 October, radar-equipped Japanese reconnaissance aircraft sighted various task groups of the Third Fleet, giving area commanders on Formosa and in the Philippines early warning. Knowing that dawn strikes on 12 October were imminent, ground forces were placed on alert and aircraft were readied for early morning intercept. The Japanese forces on Formosa positioned their fighter planes in two groups, one covering Taihoku and the other covering Takao. In Kyushu, the T Attack Force prepared for night missions while other air units planned a large formation attack against the American carriers.

Combat experience of U.S. carrier air groups during the battle depended to a considerable degree upon disposition of their task group and assigned strike targets. On the morning of 12 October, the four task groups of the Fast Carrier Task Force were strung out roughly from northwest to southeast. Task Group 38.2, as the northernmost group, was assigned the northern third of Formosa. Task Group 38.3 was next in line and assigned the central portion of the island. Finally, Task Groups 38.1 and 38.4 were jointly assigned southern Formosa.

=== 12 October ===
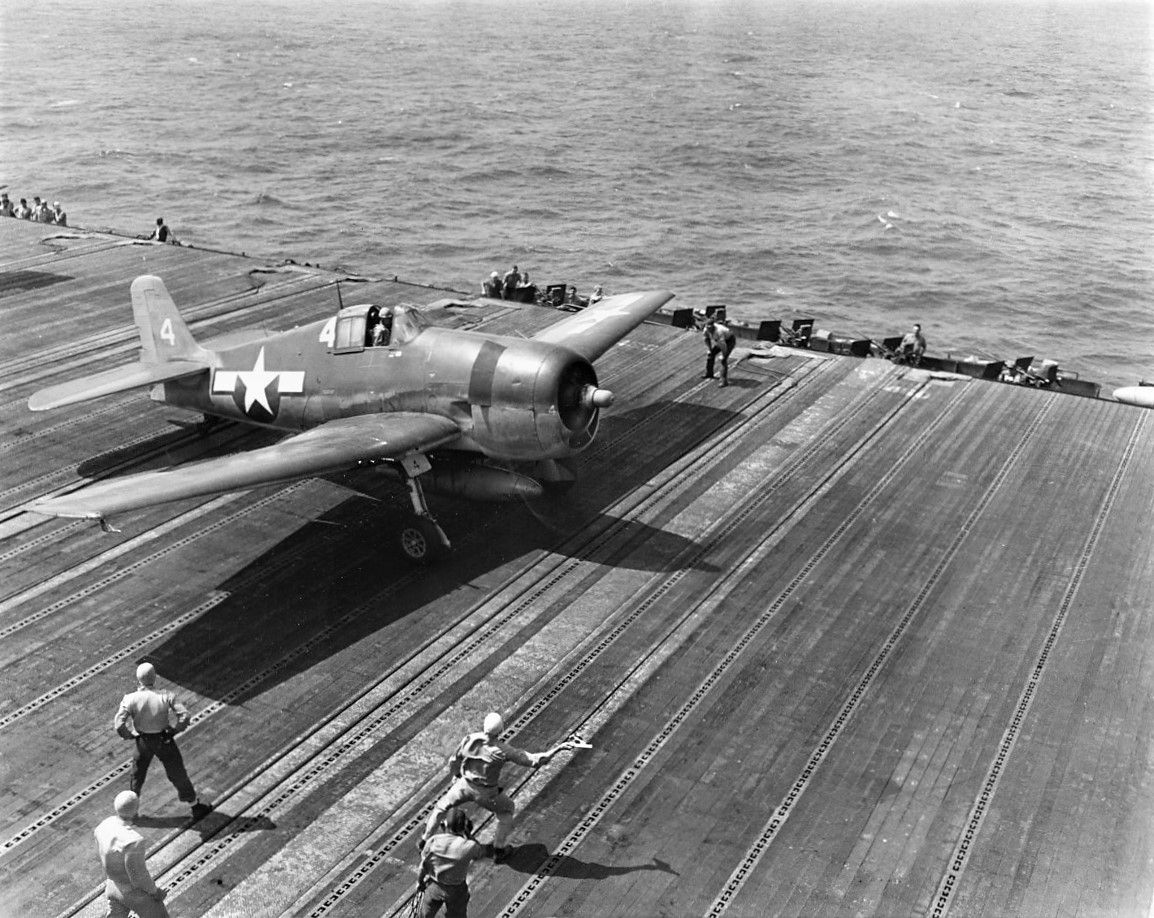
USS Lexington (CV-16) launching an F6F Hellcat during the Formosa Air Battle, 12 October 1944

All four task groups completed launch of predawn fighter sweeps by around 06:00 hours. Because the Japanese were on alert, Grumman F6F Hellcat fighters from all four groups were intercepted by enemy aircraft and moderate to intense anti-aircraft fire was universally reported. Air-to-air engagements were fiercest over northern and central Formosa, where aircraft from Rear Admiral Gerald F. Bogan's TG 38.2 and Rear Admiral Frederick C. Sherman's TG 38.3 operated. Sherman's USS Lexington and USS Essex claimed almost 50 enemy aircraft shot down between them. Bogan's task group contained three Essex-class carriers – USS Intrepid, USS Bunker Hill and USS Hancock. Intrepid and Bunker Hill claimed over 50 Japanese aircraft destroyed, making the combined claims for the two groups around 100. The Japanese lost 17 of their 50 operational Formosa-based fighters, according to survivor Kazuo Odachi. Many of Japan's more experienced pilots were killed during the first wave of American air raid.

American carrier air groups had suffered minimal personnel losses with nine U.S. aircraft shot down with three pilots subsequently recovered by nearby ships or submarines. These lopsided results were in part due to a lack of experience among Japanese pilots. IJAAS fighters stationed to the north of the Philippines were still in training. The bulk of enemy fighter aircraft reported by U.S. aviators were Japanese Army types, primarily the Nakajima Ki-44 (Allied reporting name "Tojo"), Kawasaki Ki-61 ("Tony") and Nakajima Ki-43 ("Oscar") models. Even though there were some experienced Japanese naval aviators operating at this time, IJNAS Mitsubishi A6M Zero fighter units reconstituted after the Battle of the Philippine Sea were still learning to work together and did not execute the kind of section or division flying that yielded tactical advantage. In addition, Japanese commander Shigeru Fukudome observed that while planes in his units caught fire almost immediately upon receiving damage, American fighters were less likely to ignite.

Though the day's remaining carrier strikes by Hellcat fighters, Curtiss SB2C Helldiver dive bombers, and Grumman TBF Avenger torpedo bombers did significant damage to military installations on Formosa, they failed to completely neutralize Japanese air power based on the island. Many surviving structures would be destroyed by B-29 raids during the later days of the battle, however.

The only effective Japanese counterattack to develop against TF 38 came from the home islands of Japan. A hundred or so aircraft from Kyushu attacked the task force during day time on the 12th, reportedly damaging two carriers. Hundreds more would sortie out on the 14th and 15th but fail to sight the American fleet again. Meanwhile, the T Attack Force trained for all-weather and night operations flew south to execute Japan's first large-scale radar assisted nighttime aerial torpedo attack. The results were lackluster. U.S. Navy ships made smoke for cover and engaged in radical maneuvering to keep enemies astern as Japanese aircraft dropped flares to illuminate their targets. Eight Japanese aircraft were shot down by ships' guns during the night, and three Mitsubishi G4M "Betty" bombers were claimed by night fighters from the USS Independence. USS Pritchett suffered damage from friendly fire, but no damage from enemy aircraft was incurred.

=== 13 October ===
On 13 October the weather was more uncooperative than on the previous day. Even though a wider array of targets was assigned to the task groups, from the Pescadores to northern Luzon and Formosa, far fewer enemies were encountered in the air. Results of the day's strike operations were hard to ascertain due to the overcast. Pilots' reports from these two days of strikes helped uncover a larger network of air bases on Formosa than previously anticipated. This knowledge, combined with radio intercepts and the dusk strikes fended off the previous evening, led Commander Task Force 38 Mitscher to cancel any strikes scheduled to take off after 14:00 hours. Instead, the task groups prepared to defend against another night assault.

Elements of the T Attack Force returned as expected to carry out twilight strikes against U.S. warships. This time, TGs 38.1 and 38.4 found themselves under attack. Japanese formations were spotted via radar at 16:40 and intercepted by Combat Air Patrol (CAP) planes from TG 38.4's USS Belleau Wood an hour later. The Belleau Wood fighters put the enemy formation to rout more than 70 miles (110 km) from the carrier force, destroying 10 fighters and bombers before returning to their ship.

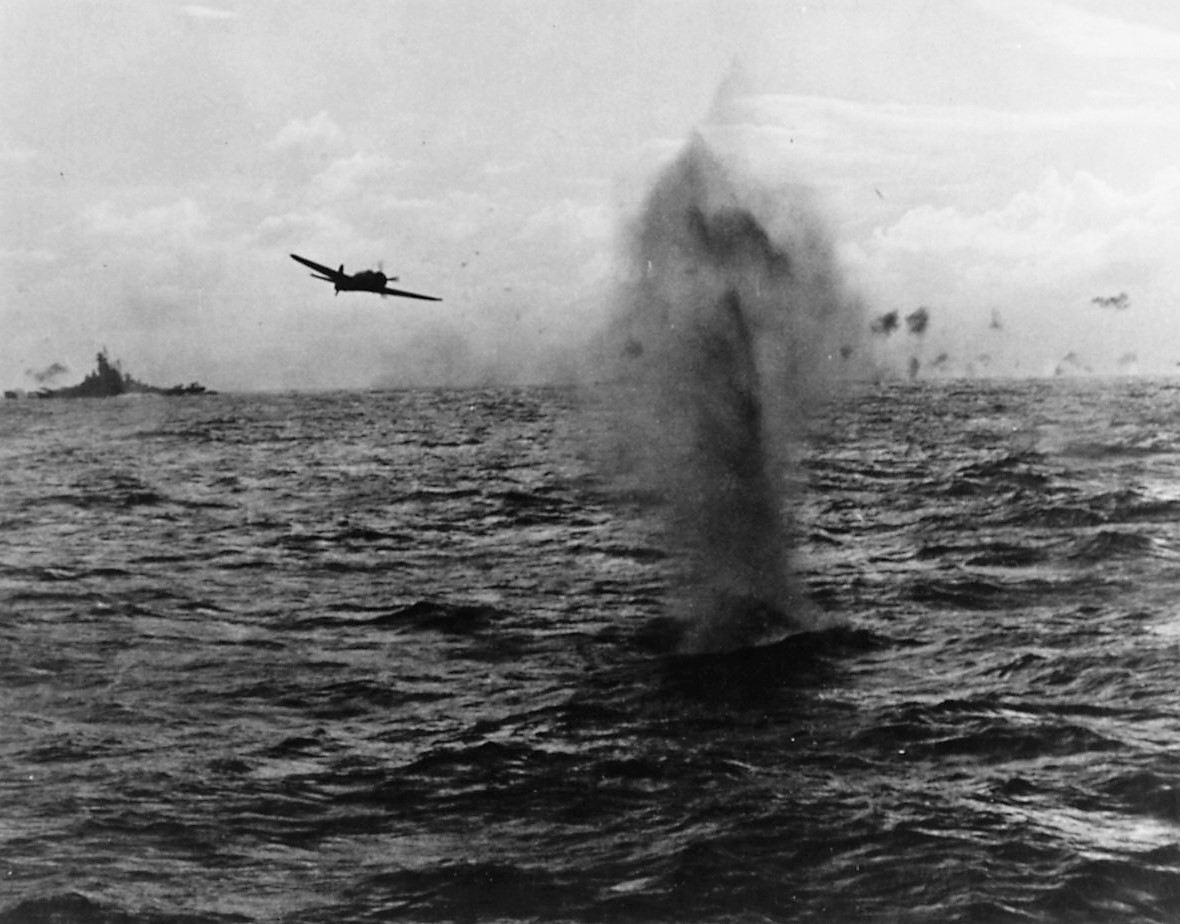
B6N torpedo bomber attacking TG 38.3 during the Formosa Air Battle, October 1944

By 18:12, just before sunset, another formation of T Attack Force pilots was closing to within striking range of the task groups. Six more planes were shot down in the vicinity of TG 38.4 in the span of twenty minutes. A subsequent group of six Mitsubishi G4M "Betty" bombers which had penetrated the picket and evaded the CAP made determined attacks on the carriers of TG 38.4, putting four torpedoes in the water before all six were shot down by shipboard anti-aircraft guns. One torpedo ran just ahead of the USS Franklin, and another ran too deep and passed beneath the carrier. One of the Bettys attempted to crash into Franklin on its way down but glanced off the flight deck and slid over the starboard edge of the ship into the water.

TG 38.1 was not as lucky. Ten Yokosuka P1Y "Frances" bombers made contact with the group at 18:23 after eluding early radar detection by flying low over the water. Though visual contact was made and shipboard anti-aircraft fire destroyed six planes, one Frances pressed home a determined torpedo attack on the carriers. The pilot was forced off course, missing his chance to torpedo a fleet carrier; however, his torpedo struck the USS Canberra, killing 23 of her crew and inflicting serious damage upon the cruiser. Both engine rooms flooded and damage was done to the rudder. As a result, Canberra had to be taken in tow as part of a new task group, TG 30.3, composed of ships detached from the carrier groups. Around 22:00 USS Wichita began towing the crippled cruiser to the southeast.

=== 14 October ===
The task groups were forced to stay within enemy air range longer than anticipated due to Canberra's situation. Early morning fighter sweeps were launched to suppress air power on Luzon and Formosa while the newly formed task group attempted to escort Canberra to safety. Some air groups encountered Japanese planes in the strike zones, but no major air-to-air combat developed. Throughout the afternoon, enemy aircraft flew to the perimeter of the task groups to relay sighting reports.

Another long night at general quarters was anticipated by CTF 38. This intelligence was proved correct in short order. TGs 38.1, 38.2, and 38.3 all suffered mass enemy air attacks between roughly 15:00–18:30 hours.

TG 38.2 was the first group attacked. A formation of 25 Yokosuka D4Y "Judy" dive bombers, using cloud cover to evade detection, was intercepted by the group's combat air patrol. Only a few Japanese planes made it past the American fighters. The surviving bombers were able to put two bombs in the vicinity of the Hancock, and one hit the forward port side gun tub without detonating on impact. No serious damage was inflicted by this attack.

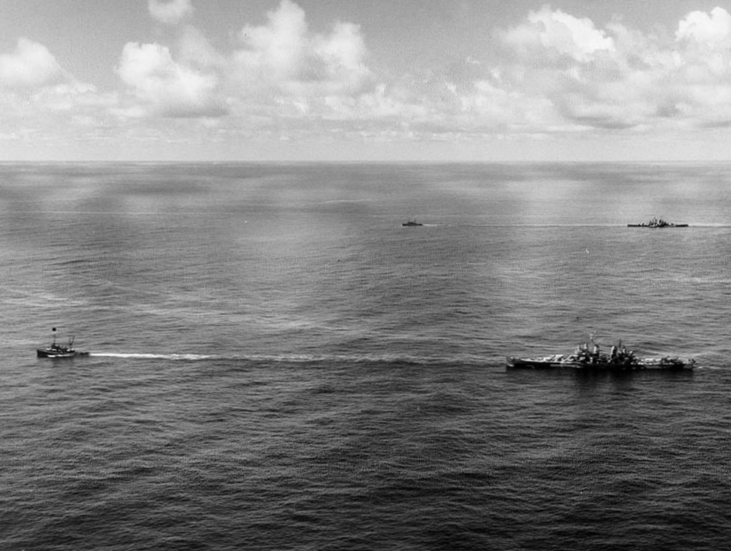
USS Canberra and USS Houston under tow after receiving torpedo hits during the Formosa Air Battle, 12–16 October 1944

At around 17:00 a large formation of enemies showed up on radar headed towards TG 38.3. As before, a great many of these were shot down by combat air patrol. The surviving enemy planes flew down to the water level to evade further radar detection. These planes – torpedo bombers and fighters – successfully ambushed the formation just minutes later. Evasive maneuvers, squall weather, and poor fighter cover on the part of the Japanese helped TG 38.3 escape without suffering any significant damage.

Task Group 38.1 had been designated as cover for the retiring Canberra group. At 16:15 USS Houston joined TG 38.1 to replace Wichita, which had been positioned to port off Wasp's bow before its assignment as tow boat. A large bogey appeared after sunset at 1831. Anti-aircraft batteries of the group's picket ships downed ten planes as they attempted to close on the carriers, but there were many more that made it to the center of the group. At least two enemy aircraft put torpedoes into the water in the vicinity of the Houston. The ship turned hard to starboard in an attempt to avoid the first torpedo wake that was seen. Though a second torpedo missed the ship to port, the first struck the cruiser amidships between the keel and armor belt. Flooding in the engine rooms and other interior spaces caused the ship to take on a 16° list. Many of the ship's crew had gone over the side of the wallowing vessel into the water. An order to abandon ship was almost given, but it was decided that USS Boston would tow the damaged cruiser back east.

Though attacks against TG 38.1 continued for hours after the Houston was hit, no further successes were scored by Japanese raiders.

=== 15 October ===
Initially, operations orders called for the task groups to refuel on this date. Given the torpedoing of Houston and Canberra, however, only TGs 38.2 and 38.3 departed for refueling. TG 38.4 was reassigned strikes on Luzon to keep attacking planes at bay while TG 38.1 continued to function as escort for the group of damaged ships now nicknamed "Crippled Division 1". Faced with the decision to either scuttle or protect the damaged cruisers, advisers to Admiral William Halsey Jr., the commander of the U.S. 3rd Fleet, convinced him to turn a bad situation into an opportunity. Unofficially dubbed "Bait Division", the slow-moving ships and their escorts were used as a lure to draw out the Japanese fleet. Urgent radio transmissions were broadcast on open channels in the hopes of enemy interception. It appeared based on sighting reports that the plan might work: in the morning and evening, cruiser and battleship forces were reported heading south from Japan and southeast from Formosa. (Note: The sighting report of "battleships" was actually Adm. Shima's heavy cruisers. Cf. Prados p. 145.)

Meanwhile, enemy air attacks did not slack off despite severe losses suffered by the Japanese over the preceding days. Rather than waiting for nighttime raids, Japanese attack formations, escorted by A6M Zero fighters, conducted strikes on TGs 38.1 and 38.4 from dawn to dusk. Combat air patrol over TG 38.4 had to be augmented with additional fighters to intercept incoming Japanese aircraft. Approximately two dozen Japanese attack and fighter planes were shot down between 10:45–10:56 hours by a combination of CAP fighters and ships' guns. Fighters from USS San Jacinto accounted for many more planes destroyed throughout the afternoon hours. Though Franklin took a glancing bomb hit during these battles, the damage proved superficial. TG 38.4 planes did battle with the enemy over land as well. Air Group 13 (CAG-13) aboard Franklin encountered a large group of enemies at Nielson Field during the morning strikes against Luzon. They claimed at least 20 enemy planes for a loss of just one Hellcat fighter.

Once again, TG 38.1 was subject to the most concerted Japanese attacks. No offensive strikes were launched by the group's aircraft. Instead, CAP strength was bolstered as much as possible. Fighting Squadron 14 (VF-14) aboard USS Wasp claimed 30 enemy planes shot down by day's end, and other carrier fighter groups in the task group downed over a dozen more. Some close bomb hits were recorded by the carriers, but no real damage was done to any U.S. warship during these attacks.

=== 16 October ===
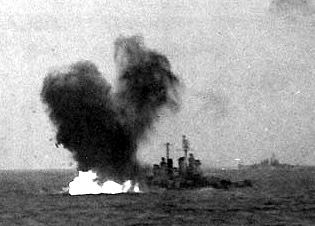
Japanese aerial torpedo explodes against USS Houston's starboard quarter during the afternoon of 16 October 1944 while the ship was under tow by USS Pawnee.

Long-range searches were conducted in the morning and afternoon by task force aircraft. It was hoped that a Japanese surface fleet would be heading towards the broadcast location of Bait Division. Unfortunately, by the evening it was clear that enemy reconnaissance aircraft had taken stock of remaining U.S. fleet strength. No surface engagement developed from Halsey's "Lure of the Streamlined Bait".

Though enemy ships did not materialize, Japanese air attacks continued in force throughout the morning and into the afternoon. Dedicated air cover for TG 30.3 was provided by light carriers USS Cowpens and USS Cabot, whose air groups intercepted numerous bandits. (Note: In Navy parlance, a bogey is a visual or radar sighting of an aircraft whose allegiance is unknown. A bandit on the other hand is an aircraft definitively identified as an enemy.) The largest strike, consisting of 75 Japanese attack and fighter planes, arrived around 13:30 hours. One twin engine plane fought through the CAP and ships' anti-aircraft batteries, surviving just long enough to put a torpedo in the water before the plane itself crashed into the sea.

The torpedo struck the after portion of the starboard side of the Houston, blowing 20 men overboard and spreading gasoline fires in the waters around the cruiser. Initially unsure whether the ship would hold together, the captain ordered the evacuation of 300 crew members while the ship's condition was ascertained. In the end it was determined she would stay afloat. Towing continued as before, slowly moving the task group towards the Naval Base Ulithi.

== Aftermath ==
Surviving Japanese pilots returned with tales of a stunning victory. It was reported that practically the whole U.S. Third Fleet had been sunk and that the American carrier force was left in shambles. Though some members of the IJN command were initially skeptical of such reports, this narrative was carried forward by members of the cabinet until it reached Emperor Hirohito. He congratulated the Navy and Army for their success. Newspapers in particular trumpeted these claims, repeating that the U.S. task force was broken and in retreat. Even those unconvinced members of the IJN, up to and including Admiral Soemu Toyoda of the Combined Fleet, believed some kind of victory had been achieved off Formosa.

Actually, the Formosa Air Battle represented a rout of Japanese air forces and a turning point for future naval operations. About 150 planes were lost over Formosa, with an additional 179 from carrying out attacks over water on the American surface fleet. Daylight bombing runs by the Japanese had been largely ineffective. Many reports from night attacks were embellished by Japanese aviators who had insufficient training and experience due to Japan's pilot shortage. The false sense of victory led Toyoda to order an all-out pursuit of the Americans, which shortly ended in another fiasco. Upon realizing the scale of the Japanese defeat suffered on 12 October alone, Vice Admiral Fukudome lamented, "Our fighters were nothing but so many eggs thrown at the stone wall of the indomitable enemy formation."

In response to the American strikes on Formosa beginning 12 October, newly formed carrier units like the Japanese 634th Naval Air Group (NAG) were detached from their ships in the IJN's Fourth Carrier Division. Posted to the land-based 2nd Air Fleet, the 634th NAG experienced rapid attrition throughout the remainder of the month. By January 1945 this group had no personnel capable of maintaining flight operations. At the same time, older carrier units like the 653rd Naval Air Group, which had just finished rebuilding after losses suffered during the First Battle of the Philippine Sea, were detached and similarly integrated into the 2nd Air Fleet. Over the course of the Formosa Air Battle alone the 653rd NAG lost almost half of its available aircraft.

Between the aforementioned carrier air group losses, which deprived Vice Admiral Jisaburō Ozawa's ships of their pilots, and losses of experienced land-based attack units like the T Attack Force, there remained no real prospect of providing air cover over the Japanese fleet for the coming Battle of Leyte Gulf. Both historians of the battle and IJN commanders have acknowledged this factor as the primary reason for the Sho plan's failure. H. P. Willmott writes: "In large measure, the Japanese defeat in the Philippines had assumed substance...prior to the landing operations of 17 and 20 October. This was the case because of the nature and extent of the victory won by American carrier air groups in the course of their operations after 10 October." Toyoda, when posed the question "What would you say was the primary cause for the lack of success in that operation?" responded, "Our weakness in air, and...the fact that our pilots under Admiral Ozawa were not sufficiently trained."

The Formosa Air Battle also proved a turning point for Japanese military tactics. Organized kamikaze attacks had been proposed after the First Battle of the Philippine Sea but were rejected by Imperial Japanese Navy leaders through September 1944. Only in the immediate wake of the Formosa Air Battle, when Vice Admiral Takijirō Ōnishi replaced Vice Admiral Kimpei Teraoka as leader of the IJN's 1st Air Fleet, were units specifically deployed with the intent to crash-dive enemy vessels.

== See also ==
- Penghu air raids
