= Ibō Takahashi =

Japanese admiral

- 高橋 伊望
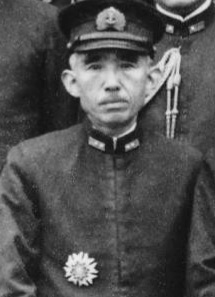
- Vice Admiral Takahashi Ibō as commander of the 3rd Fleet (November 1941)
- Born: April 20, 1888; Fukushima Prefecture, Japan
- Died: March 18, 1947 (aged 58)
- Military career
- Allegiance: Empire of Japan
- Branch: Imperial Japanese Navy
- Service years: 1908–1944
- Rank: Vice Admiral
- Commands: Tenryū, Atago, Kirishima, Weapons and Mobilization Bureau, Mako Guard District, 3rd Fleet, 2nd Southern Expeditionary Fleet, Southwest Area Fleet, Kure Naval District
- Conflicts: World War II; Pacific War

Ibō Takahashi (高橋 伊望, Takahashi Ibō; April 20, 1888 – March 18, 1947) was an admiral in the Imperial Japanese Navy during World War II.

== Biography ==
Takahashi was a native of Fukushima prefecture, born in a family of Eastern Orthodox faithful. His name "Ibō" was Chinese transliteration of "John". His father was a samurai of the Aizu domain, and doctor. He graduated from the 36th class of the Imperial Japanese Naval Academy in 1908 and was ranked 10th out of 191 cadets. He served his midshipman duty aboard the cruisers Soya and Suma and was assigned to the Asama after being commissioned as an ensign in 1910. He subsequently served on the destroyer Nenohi and battleship Shikishima. As a lieutenant from 1914, he served on the Tone and Fusō.

After graduation from the Japanese Naval War College in 1919, he was promoted to lieutenant commander and assigned as Chief Gunnery Officer on the Iwami. Around this time, Takahashi became involved in the militant movement within the Japanese military, and helped influence the implementation of the proposal to devolve overall naval command from the Minister of the Navy to the Chief of Naval General Staff (the implementation of which was ratified by Emperor Hirohito on September 25, 1933).

From August 1923 to August 1925, Takahashi was assigned as naval attaché to the United Kingdom, during which time he was promoted to commander. After his return, he served for a year as executive officer on the Tama and became captain of the Tenryū in 1929. He was also part of the Japanese delegation to the London Naval Treaty negotiations in late 1929.

Takahashi was promoted to captain November 30, 1929 and was given command of the Atago in 1932, and the battleship Kirishima in 1933.

He was promoted to rear admiral on November 15, 1935, and became chief of the Second Section of the Imperial Japanese Navy General Staff. While on the General Staff, he was a strong proponent of the Nanshin-ron, urging that New Guinea, Borneo and the Celebes in the Netherlands East Indies be considered as part of Japan's strategic sphere-of-interest. On November 15, 1939, Takahashi became vice admiral, and was given command of the Mako Guard District.

Shortly before the attack on Pearl Harbor, Takahashi served as commander-in-chief of the IJN 3rd Fleet, which included the 5th and 7th Cruiser Squadrons and the 2nd and 4th Destroyer Flotillas and formed part of the Southern Force under the command of Vice Admiral Nobutake Kondō based in Taiwan in 1941.

In January and February 1942, this force was split into the Eastern and Central Forces; the first for the invasions of Menado, Kendari and Makassar in Celebes and amphibious operations in the Banda Sea, and the second for the invasion of Dutch Borneo. Takahashi was Commander of Eastern and Central Forces during the invasions of Bali and Java. His forces included the "Direct Support Force" under Rear Admiral Shōji Nishimura, commander of the 4th Destroyer Squadron, the "Second Escort Force" under Rear Admiral Raizo Tanaka, commander of the 2nd Destroyer Squadron, the "Third Escort Force", under Rear-Admiral Chuichi Hara, and the "First Air Group" made up of the light carrier Ryūjō and 56 transports.

On March 10, 1942, he was transferred to the newly created 2nd Southern Expeditionary Fleet, and to the newly created Southwest Area Fleet a month later. In November 1942, he was transferred back to Japan to become Commander in Chief of the Kure Naval District. He held this post until retiring from active duty in 1944.

=== Personal life ===
Takahashi had two sons named Taro and Yoshiro, both of whom followed their father into the Imperial Japanese Navy. Taro graduated from the Imperial Japanese Naval Academy as part of the 69th Class on 25 March 1941, and was killed in action at the Battle of Leyte Gulf on 26 October 1944 while serving as Gunnery Officer of the destroyer Nowaki. Yoshiro graduated as part of the 71st Class on 14 November 1942, and survived the war.

== Notes ==
Military offices
| Preceded by Ozawa Jisaburō | Combined Fleet & 1st Fleet; Chief-of-staff; 15 November 1937 - 5 November 1939 | Succeeded by Fukudome Shigeru |
| Fleet recreated, post last held by Oikawa Koshirō | 3rd Fleet; Commander-in-chief; 10 April 1941 - 10 March 1942 | Succeeded by 2nd Southern Expeditionary Fleet; Himself; 3rd Fleet; Nagumo Chūichi |
| Fleet created | Southwest Area Fleet & 2nd Southern Expeditionary Fleet; Commander-in-chief; 10 April 1942 - 15 September 1942 | Succeeded by Takasu Shirō |
| Preceded by Toyoda Soemu | Kure Naval District; Commander-in-chief; 10 November 1942 - 21 June 1943 | Succeeded by Nagumo Chūichi |
