= Shigeru Fukudome =

Japanese admiral (1891–1971)

- 福留 繁
- Born: 1 February 1891; Yonago, Tottori, Empire of Japan
- Died: 6 February 1971 (aged 80); Japan
- Military career
- Allegiance: Empire of Japan
- Branch: Imperial Japanese Navy
- Service years: 1912–1945
- Rank: Vice Admiral
- Commands: Nagato, Naval Operations Bureau, 2nd Air Fleet, 13th Air Fleet, 1st Southern Expeditionary Fleet, 10th Area Fleet
- Conflicts: World War II; Pacific War; Philippines campaign

Shigeru Fukudome (福留 繁, Fukudome Shigeru; 1 February 1891 – 6 February 1971) was an admiral and Chief of Staff of the Imperial Japanese Navy's Combined Fleet during World War II.

== Biography ==
=== Early life and career ===
Born in Yonago, Tottori prefecture, Fukudome graduated from the 40th class of the Imperial Japanese Naval Academy in 1912, ranked 8 out of 144 cadets. As a midshipman, he served on the cruisers Soya and Izumo and battleship Satsuma. After his promotion to ensign, he was assigned to the battleship Hizen and cruiser Kashima.

After attending torpedo school and naval artillery school, he served on the patrol boat Manshu, followed by the cruiser Chitose and was promoted to lieutenant in 1918. After attending navigational training, he was assigned as chief navigator to the destroyer Sakura, and cruiser Niitaka. He was then appointed executive officer on the oiler Kamoi, on its voyage to the United States from 1921–1922. After his return to Japan, he was assigned a number of staff positions. He then graduated from the Naval War College with honors in 1924, and was promoted to lieutenant commander. After a tour as chief navigator on the cruiser Iwate, he joined the Imperial Japanese Navy General Staff and was promoted to commander in 1929. He continued to hold a number of staff positions through the 1930s. He was promoted to captain in 1933, and was captain of the battleship Nagato from 1938–1939. He was promoted to rear admiral on 15 November 1939.

=== Pacific War ===
Fukudome was first assigned to the Combined Fleet in 1940 to April 1941 (where he conducted aerial torpedo exercises with Admiral Isoroku Yamamoto in early 1940 in contemplation of the proposed attack on Pearl Harbor), which was then under discussion. After his promotion to vice admiral in 1942, he again served as Chief of Staff under Admiral Yamamoto's successor Admiral Mineichi Koga from May 1943 to March 1944,

On 31 March 1944, while traveling by air from Palau to deliver plans for the Japanese counterattack in defense of the Marianas Islands (code named "Z plan") to Japanese headquarters at Davao in Mindanao, Fukudome became the first flag officer in Japanese history to be captured by the enemy (Filipino guerrillas commanded by Lieutenant Colonel James M. Cushing) after his plane crash landed in a typhoon near Cebu. (Admiral Mineichi Koga, who had been traveling in a separate plane, was killed the same night). He was released to stop civilian reprisals that were killing Filipinos and burning dozens of villages as the Japanese searched for the Admiral and the documents, but the battle plans fell into the American hands.

After Koga's death in March 1944, Fukudome became commander-in-chief of the 1st Combined Base Air Force and 2nd Air Fleet, based in the Kyūshū-Okinawa-Formosa district. He later noted that this appointment was out of convenience, arguing that since he had no experience with naval aviation, his assignment to a newly formed air unit must be because of the immediate need for an officer of flag rank. On 10 October 1944, the headquarters of the 2nd Air Fleet moved from Katori in Chiba Prefecture to Taiwan; at the same time as the headquarters move, the 200 Imperial Japanese Army aircraft present in Taiwan were assigned to him to bolster his 100-aircraft fleet, with additional reinforcements coming in later in smaller quantities over time.

In late October 1944, because of the heavy losses of Japanese air units in the Philippines, Fukudome's responsibility was expanded to cover the Philippines as well. He moved his headquarters to Manila on 22 October. Another 450 aircraft reached Clark Field over the next two days to join the approximately 100 aircraft that were already there under Vice Admiral Takijirō Ōnishi, who became his chief of staff.

In January 1945, the 2nd Air Fleet was dissolved and merged with the 1st Air Fleet. With the merger of the two air fleets in the Philippines, Fukudome was transferred to Singapore to command the IJN 10th Area Fleet, which at the time consisted mainly of the 13th Air Fleet with 450 aircraft (mostly trainers) and the IJN 1st Southern Expeditionary Fleet (2 operational cruisers and other smaller ships). He arrived in Singapore and took over command on 16 January 1945, and remained in this role until the end of the war. Because of the American control of air and sea after the Philippines campaign, he was effectively stranded in Singapore without the ability to affect the outcome of the war in a significant way.

After the war, Fukudome was interrogated in Tokyo between 9–12 December 1945 by Rear Admiral Ralph A. Ofstie of the United States Navy. In addition to the cooperative interrogation with the Americans, Fukudome was also entrusted by the British to take charge of repatriating Japanese nationals from the Singapore area. Once the task of repatriation was accomplished, Fukudome was arrested at the instigation of American prosecutors and accused of war crimes; he was tried by a military tribunal in Singapore in connection with the execution of two downed American airmen during his tenure in Singapore, and found guilty of negligence in the performance of his duties.

Following his release in 1950, Fukudome became a member of a 12-man commission to advise the Japanese government on the organization of the Japanese Self-Defense Force before his death in 1971. His grave is at the Tama Cemetery in Fuchu, outside of Tokyo.

== Notable positions held ==
- Equipping Officer, CVS Kamoi – 1 December 1921 – 12 September 1922
- Chief Navigator, CVS Kamoi – 12 September 1922 – 10 December 1922
- Staff Officer, 1st Fleet – 8 January 1924 – 15 October 1924
- Staff Officer, Combined Fleet – 8 January 1924 – 15 October 1924
- Staff Officer, Combined Fleet – 16 November 1933 – 15 November 1934
- Staff Officer, 1st Fleet – 16 November 1933 – 15 November 1934
- Vice-Chief-of-Staff, China Area Fleet – 25 April 1938 – 15 December 1938
- Staff Officer, 3rd Fleet – 25 April 1938 – 15 December 1938
- Commanding Officer, Nagato – 15 December 1938 – 5 November 1939
- Chief-of-Staff, 1st Fleet – 15 November 1939 – 10 April 1941
- Chief-of-Staff, Combined Fleet – 1942 – 31 March 1944
- Commander-in-Chief, 2nd Air Fleet – 15 June 1944 – 8 January 1945
- Commander-in-Chief, 13th Air Fleet – 13 January 1945 – 15 August 1945

Military offices
Preceded by Takahashi Ibō	Combined Fleet & 1st Fleet; Chief-of-staff; 5 November 1939 – 10 April 1941	Succeeded by Itō Seiichi
Preceded by Ugaki Matome	Combined Fleet; Chief-of-staff; 22 May 1943 – 6 April 1944	Succeeded by Kusaka Ryūnosuke
Fleet created	10th Area Fleet & 1st Southern Expeditionary Fleet; Commander-in-Chief; 5 February 1945 – 15 August 1945	Fleet dissolved

== Dates of Promotions ==
- Midshipman – 17 July 1912
- Ensign – 1 December 1913
- Sublieutenant – 13 December 1915
- Lieutenant – 1 December 1918
- Lieutenant Commander – 1 December 1924
- Commander – 30 November 1929
- Captain – 15 November 1933
- Rear Admiral – 15 November 1939
- Vice Admiral – 1 November 1942

== Portrayal in films ==
Fukudome was one of the characters that appeared in the 1970 American/Japanese war film Tora! Tora! Tora!, where he was portrayed by the Japanese actor Koji Kawamura.
