= 10th Area Fleet (Imperial Japanese Navy) =

- Active: 1 February 1945 – Sep 1945
- Country: (Empire of Japan)
- Branch: Imperial Japanese Navy
- Battle honours: Pacific Theatre of World War II

Commanders
- Notable commanders: Shigeru Fukudome

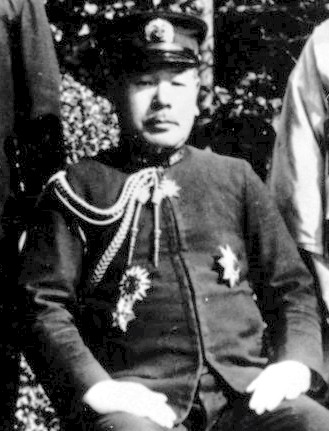
Admiral Shigeru Fukudome, CIC of the IJN 10th Area Fleet

The 10th Area Fleet (第十方面艦隊, Dai-jyū Hōmen Kantai) was a fleet of the Imperial Japanese Navy (IJN) established during World War II as a result of IJN commands being isolated in the Philippines.

== History ==
The commander in chief of the 1st Southern Expeditionary Fleet based in Singapore was named commander in chief of the newly created Tenth Area Fleet on 1 February 1944. As the Southwest Area Fleet command staff was isolated in the Philippines, a new command structure was necessary to direct the 1st and 2nd Southern Expeditionary Fleet, and the surviving elements of the 5th Fleet. It was supported by the 13th Air Fleet. The 10th Area Fleet had responsibility for the defenses of Indonesia and Indochina. It lost most of its combat capability at the Battle of the Malacca Strait and when Ashigara was sunk by HMS Trenchant and was disbanded at the end of the Pacific War.

The 10th Area Fleet was a theatre command and its name was taken sequentially from the numbered fleets rather than from the area in which it was located.

== Structure of the 10th Area Fleet ==
Date	Higher unit	Lower units
5 February 1945 (original)	Combined Fleet	IJN 1st Southern Expeditionary Fleet, 2nd Southern Expeditionary Fleet, 13th Air Fleet, 5th Cruiser Division, Auxiliary survey ship Hakusa, Auxiliary gunboat Nankai
1 June 1945	Combined Fleet	IJN 1st Southern Expeditionary Fleet, 2nd Southern Expeditionary Fleet, 13th Air Fleet, 5th Cruiser Division, Auxiliary gunboat Nankai, No.27 Special Base Force, No.25 Base Force, No.28 Base Force
12 September 1945	Surrendered to United Kingdom in Singapore.	

== Commanders of the 10th Area Fleet ==
Commander in chief

	Rank	Name	Date	Additional post
1	Vice-Admiral	Shigeru Fukudome	5 Feb 1945 - Sep 1945	Commander of the IJN 1st Southern Expeditionary Fleet and the 13th Air Fleet

Chief of staff

	Rank	Name	Date	Additional post
1	Rear-Admiral	Bunji Asakura	5 Feb 1945 - Sep 1945	Chief of staff of the IJN 1st Southern Expeditionary Fleet and the 13th Air Fleet
