= Gunichi Mikawa =

Japanese admiral (1888–1981)

- 三川 軍一
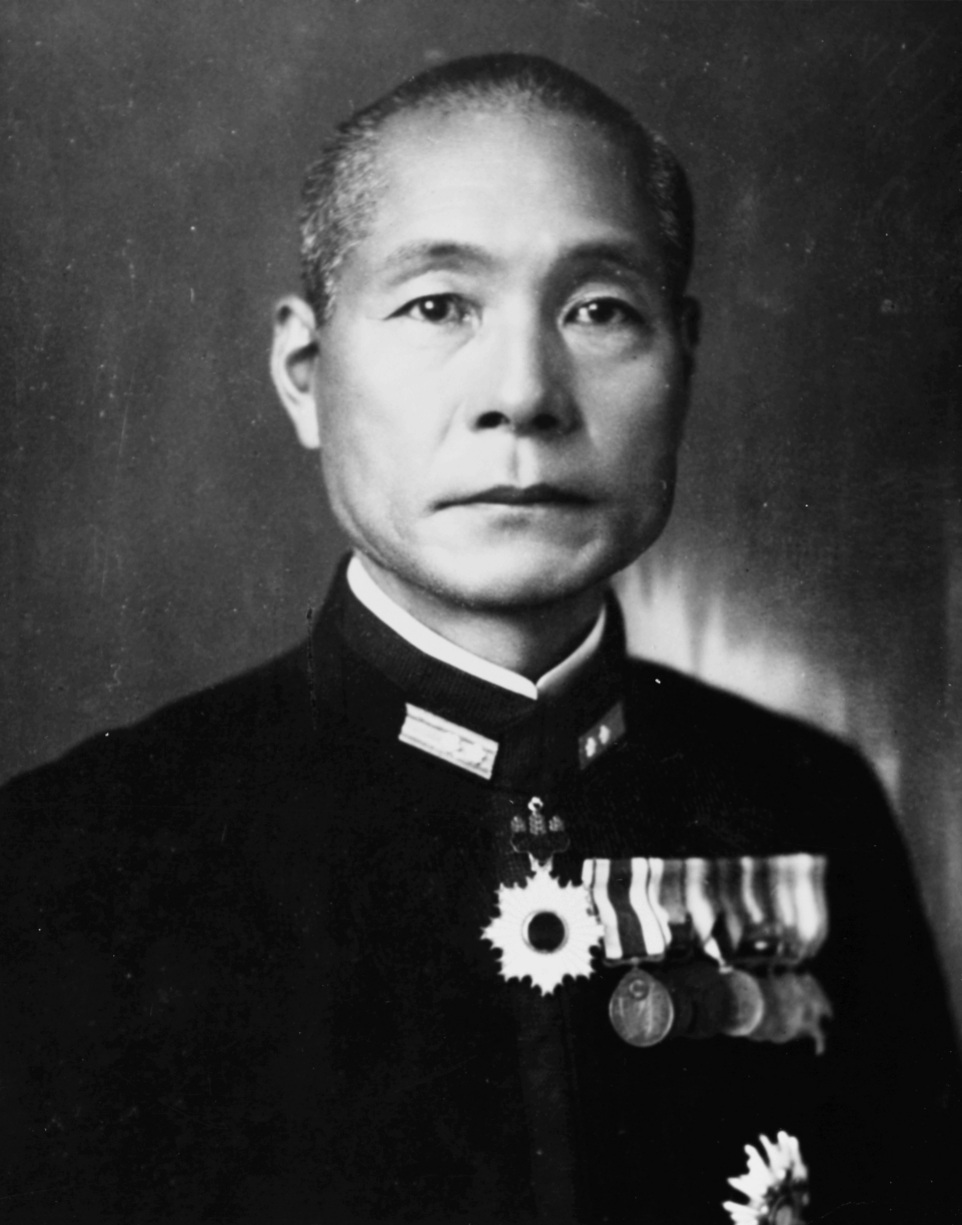
- Born: 29 August 1888; Takada-mura, Hiroshima, Japan
- Died: 25 February 1981 (aged 92); Ikoma, Nara, Japan
- Military career
- Allegiance: Empire of Japan
- Branch: Imperial Japanese Navy
- Service years: 1910–1945
- Rank: Vice Admiral
- Commands: Hayatomo, Aoba, Chōkai, Kirishima, Weapons and Mobilization Bureau, 7th Squadron, 5th Squadron, 3rd Squadron, 8th Fleet, Naval Navigation School, 2nd Southern Expeditionary Fleet, Southwest Area Fleet, 13th Air Fleet, 3rd Southern Expeditionary Fleet
- Conflicts: World War II; Pacific War; Attack on Pearl Harbor; Indian Ocean Raid; Battle of Midway; Battle of Savo Island; Naval Battle of Guadalcanal; Battle of the Bismarck Sea
- Awards: Order of the Rising Sun (3rd class); Order of the Rising Sun (4th class); Order of the Sacred Treasure (2nd class)

Gunichi Mikawa (三川 軍一, Mikawa Gun'ichi; 29 August 1888 – 25 February 1981) was a vice admiral in the Imperial Japanese Navy (IJN) during World War II. Mikawa was the commander of a heavy cruiser force that defeated the United States Navy (USN) and the Royal Australian Navy (RAN) at the Battle of Savo Island in Ironbottom Sound on the night of 8–9 August 1942.

In this battle, his squadron of cruisers, plus one destroyer, sank three USN cruisers, plus the RAN heavy cruiser HMAS Canberra; Mikawa's force suffered no losses in the actual battle, although heavy cruiser Kako was sunk by the undetected American submarine S-44 on the return to their base near Rabaul in the Bismarck Archipelago. However, his later career was of mixed success, and he was reassigned to lesser posts after the loss of a troop convoy destined for New Guinea. After the war Mikawa retired back to Japan, where he died in 1981 at the age of 92.

== Early career ==
Mikawa was a native of Hiroshima prefecture. He graduated from the 38th class of the Imperial Japanese Naval Academy in 1910, ranked third of his class of 149 cadets. After midshipman service in the cruisers Asama and Soya, and battleships Satsuma and Kongō, he attended Naval Torpedo and Gunnery Schools from 1913–1914. In late 1914, he joined the cruiser Aso for World War I duty, including a cruise to China. This was followed by tours in the destroyer Sugi and transport Seito and studies at the Japanese Naval War College.

From 1919 to 1920, Lieutenant Mikawa was attached to the Japanese delegation to the post-war Versailles Peace Treaty Conference in France. During the 1920s, Mikawa served as chief navigator on a number of ships, including the battleship Haruna and cruisers Tatsuta, Ikoma, and Aso. He was subsequently an instructor at the Naval Torpedo School and held several other highly visible posts. At the end of the decade, Commander Mikawa was part of the delegation to the London Naval Treaty and shortly thereafter became naval attaché in Paris. Promoted to the rank of captain in late 1930, he returned to Japan to take up administrative and training duties.

He was commanding officer of the heavy cruisers Aoba and Chōkai and the battleship Kirishima in the mid-1930s. Mikawa was promoted to rear admiral on 1 December 1936.

From 1 December 1936 to 15 November 1937, he was chief of staff of the IJN 2nd Fleet. Mikawa had duty with the Imperial Japanese Navy General Staff and Imperial General Headquarters from 1937 to 1939, then went to sea again to command a succession of fleet squadrons, first in cruisers and then in battleships. He was promoted to vice admiral on 15 November 1940.

== World War II ==
At the time of the Attack on Pearl Harbor, Mikawa was in command of Battleship Division 3 (BatDiv 3). He personally led the first section of his division as part of the screening force for the Pearl Harbor attack force, while the remaining battleships were sent south to cover the landings of Japanese troops in Malaya. Mikawa likewise led from the front during the Indian Ocean Raid and the Battle of Midway.

=== Battle of Savo Island ===
From 14 July 1942 to 1 April 1943, Mikawa commanded the newly formed IJN 8th Fleet in the South Pacific Ocean, based primarily at the major bases at Rabaul on the island of New Britain and Kavieng on New Ireland. During that time, he led Japanese naval forces involved in the Guadalcanal campaign and the Solomon Islands Campaign. On the night of 8 to 9 August 1942, Mikawa commanded a force of 7 heavy cruisers, plus one destroyer. Mikawa's fleet was able to steam undetected through Iron Bottom Sound by American and Australian forces. At 2345, the USS Ralph Talbot (DD-390) detected Japanese cruiser float planes, but was unable to determine if the planes were friendly or enemy. They tried to radio in what they saw but were unable to reach anyone. The Japanese Navy then detected the USS Blue (DD-387) and pointed their guns on her. However Blue did not detect the Japanese fleet so Mikawa pressed on without opening fire. At 0145, Mikawa ordered torpedoes to be launched and opened fire on the unsuspecting American and Austrian Navy's. In under an hour, the US Navy had lost 4 cruisers with a 5th badly damaged, and 2 destroyers. It was one of the worst defeats in US naval history.

However, Mikawa was somewhat criticized by his superiors for his failure to aggressively follow up on his victory. He could have pursued to the south and attacked the fleet of unarmed American cargo transports that were at anchor, waiting until daybreak when they could continue delivering ammunition and supplies to the American 1st Marine Division, which had landed on Guadalcanal on 8 August 1942. Instead, Mikawa decided to turn northward and retire back to the safety of his base at Rabaul. Mikawa's only ship that was sunk or badly damaged was the cruiser Kako, which was torpedoed and sunk by the U.S. Navy submarine S-44 on their voyage back to Rabaul. However, after the war Mikawa maintained that based on the available intelligence there was an American carrier task force just south of the island of Guadalcanal, one that would surely launch an airstrike in the morning and inflict heavy loses to his fleet, not to mention that just before he set out he was specifically instructed by chief of IJN general staff Osami Nagano that he should avoid losing ships if possible and there simply was not enough time left to both attack the transports and withdraw safely under the cover of darkness. Unbeknownst to him at the time however the American aircraft carriers had withdrawn south the evening prior and he was already out of their striking range. Therefore he did not believe he had made an incorrect decision in withdrawing from Savo Island based on the information available to him at that time.

=== Guadalcanal campaign ===
On the night of 13 to 14 November 1942, Mikawa led a cruiser force that bombarded the critical American air base of Henderson Field on Guadalcanal during the Naval Battle of Guadalcanal, but the next day lost one retreating heavy cruiser to air attacks originating there. Throughout the campaign for Guadalcanal, Rear Admiral Raizō Tanaka often commanded the nighttime runs of the "Tokyo Express", fast warships that delivered soldiers and supplies to Japanese Army force on Guadalcanal. However, Mikawa's attempt to land Japanese reinforcements to the base of Lae on New Guinea turned into the disastrous (for the Japanese) Battle of the Bismarck Sea, one that involved only Japanese surface ships versus American and Royal Australian Air Force land-based aircraft.

=== Later naval career ===
Mikawa was soon forced to take responsibility for the loss of most of the Solomon Islands, and he was reassigned to rear areas, such as the Philippines. Admiral Mikawa also stated to the High Command of the IJN that fighting the Americans for the Solomon Islands was simply pouring Japanese soldiers, sailors, airmen, and ships into a "black hole". Mikawa was correct about this, but his superiors in the IJN and the generals of the Imperial Japanese Army refused to listen to him.

Mikawa had Naval General Staff and other shore posts in Japan from April to September 1943. From 3 September 1943 to 18 June 1944, Mikawa commanded the 2nd Southern Expeditionary Fleet in the Philippines. Afterwards, he commanded the very small "Southwest Area Fleet" and the very depleted "13th Air Fleet" from 18 June to 1 November 1944, also in the Philippines. By this time, the writing was on the wall that Japan faced only defeat after defeat until it would be forced to surrender. Reassigned to shore duty in Japan following the Battle of Leyte Gulf in October 1944, Mikawa retired from active duty with the IJN in May 1945.

=== Massacre on board Akikaze ===
In March 1943, the destroyer Akikaze evacuated civilians from the Roman Catholic mission headquarters on Kairiru Island and also a group of missionaries from Wewak. The roughly 60 civilians, mostly German missionaries, their servants and dependents (including three infants), were then massacred on board the destroyer under orders that came from 8th Fleet HQ. As commander of the 8th Fleet at the time, Mikawa and his chief of staff Vice Admiral Shinzō Ōnishi were implicated in the war crime. At 8th Fleet HQ a Lieutenant Shigetoku Kami debriefed the captain of Akikaze after the massacre, he was the only staff officer whose name appeared in the testimony of Japanese witnesses. Mikawa and Ōnishi were interrogated after the war as the Australian War Crimes Section realized that the order to murder over 60 civilians could not have been given by a single low-ranking officer.

Both admirals said that it was Kami, perhaps aided by another staff officer who was in charge of civilian affairs, who ordered the massacre independently. They also claimed that they were not aware of the massacre until after the fact. However, historian Yuki Tanaka writes that their claims are dubious when contrasted with wartime navy procedures in force when issuing orders. It was unlikely that communication officers of the 8th Fleet would agree to encrypt and deliver Kami's order to the commander of Akikaze, if it did not bear the countersignatures of Mikawa and Ōnishi. In addition, the more junior officers involved in the massacre died during the war and could not corroborate their claims. In the opinion of Captain Albert Klestadt, a member of the investigation, even if the admirals did not issue the orders themselves, they had to accept command responsibility for being unable to prevent war crimes committed by subordinates.

== Postwar and final days ==
After the war, Admiral Mikawa lived a long and rather quiet life in Japan, dying in 1981 at the age of 92.

Mikawa and the Long Lance torpedo were commemorated in 1992 by a commemorative postage stamp issued by the Republic of the Marshall Islands. Mikawa's character also appeared in the 1970 American/Japanese war film Tora! Tora! Tora!, where he was portrayed by the Japanese actor Fujio Suga.

== Sources ==
- D'Albas, Andrieu (1965). Death of a Navy: Japanese Naval Action in World War II. Devin-Adair Pub. ISBN 0-8159-5302-X.
- Dull, Paul S. (1978). A Battle History of the Imperial Japanese Navy, 1941–1945. Naval Institute Press. ISBN 0-87021-097-1.
- Frank, Richard B. (1990). Guadalcanal: The Definitive Account of the Landmark Battle. New York: Penguin Group. ISBN 0-14-016561-4.
- Lacroix, Eric; Linton Wells (1997). Japanese Cruisers of the Pacific War. Naval Institute Press. ISBN 0-87021-311-3.
- Loxton, Bruce; Chris Coulthard-Clark (1997). The Shame of Savo: Anatomy of a Naval Disaster. Australia: Allen & Unwin Pty Ltd. ISBN 1-86448-286-9.
- Morison, Samuel Eliot (1958). The Struggle for Guadalcanal, August 1942 – February 1943, vol. 5 of History of United States Naval Operations in World War II. Boston: Little, Brown and Company. ISBN 0-316-58305-7.

Military offices
Preceded by Niimi Masaichi	2nd Fleet; Chief-of-staff; 1 December 1936 – 15 November 1937	Succeeded by Itō Seiichi
Fleet Created	8th Fleet; Commander-in-chief; 14 July 1942 – 1 April 1943	Succeeded by Samejima Tomoshige
Preceded by Koga Mineichi	Yokosuka Naval District; Acting Commander-in-chief; 21 April 1943 – 21 May 1943	Succeeded by Toyoda Soemu
Preceded by Takasu Shirō	Southwest Area Fleet; Commander-in-chief; 18 June 1944 – 1 November 1944	Succeeded by Okawauchi Denshichi
