= Central Pacific Area Fleet =

- Active: 4 March 1944 – 18 July 1944
- Country: (Empire of Japan)
- Branch: Imperial Japanese Navy
- Battle honours: Pacific Theatre of World War II

Commanders
- Notable commanders: Chūichi Nagumo

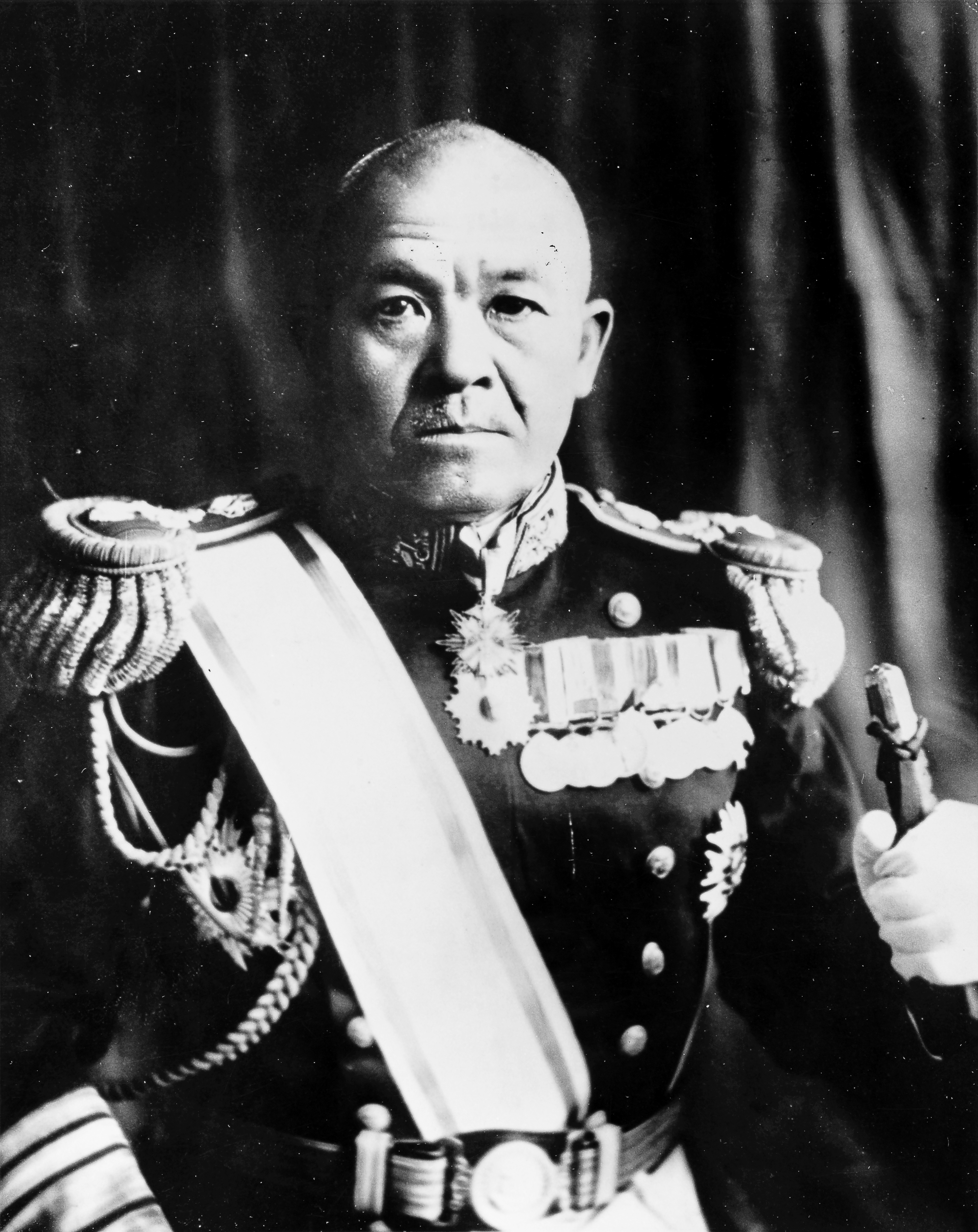
Admiral Chuichi Nagumo, CIC Central Pacific Fleet

The Central Pacific Area Fleet (中部太平洋方面艦隊, Chūbu Taiheiyō Hōmen Kantai) was a fleet of the Imperial Japanese Navy established during World War II.

== History ==
The Central Pacific Area Fleet was a short-lived operational headquarters of the Imperial Japanese Navy, established on March 4, 1944. With United States Navy forces having driven the Japanese out of the Marshall Islands and Caroline Islands in late 1943 to early 1944, the remnants of Japanese naval forces from those areas regrouped under the direction of Admiral Chuichi Nagumo. The new Central Pacific Area Fleet was a combined operational command containing air (IJN 14th Air Fleet) and ground (IJA 31st Army) elements, and was tasked with the defense of the Mariana Islands and Palau, from its command center in Saipan.

With the fall of Saipan to American forces on July 8, 1944 and subsequent death of Admiral Nagumo and his staff, the Central Area Fleet ceased to exist.

== Transition ==
Date	Higher unit	Lower unit and vessels
4 March 1944 (original)	Combined Fleet	4th Fleet, 14th Air Fleet, Isuzu, No.5 Special Base Force, No.30 Base Force, No.4 Weather Observation Unit
8 July 1944	HQ was annihilated.	
18 July 1944	disbanded	

== Commanders of the IJN Central Pacific Area Fleet ==
Commander in chief

	Rank	Name	Date	Note, additional post
1	Vice-Admiral/Admiral	Chūichi Nagumo	4 March 1944	Commander of the 14th Air Fleet. KIA on 8 July 1944. Posthumously promoted to Admiral on same day.
x	vacant post		9 July 1944	

Chief of staff

	Rank	Name	Date	Note, additional post
1	Rear-Admiral/Vice-Admiral	Hideo Yano	4 March 1944	Chief of staff of the 14th Air Fleet. KIA on 8 July 1944. Posthumously promoted to Vice-Admiral on same day.
x	vacant post		9 July 1944	
