= Southwest Area Fleet =

- Active: April 10, 1942 – 15 Sep 1945
- Country: (Empire of Japan)
- Branch: Imperial Japanese Navy
- Battle honours: Pacific Theatre of World War II

Commanders
- Notable commanders: Shirō Takasu

The Southwest Area Fleet (南西方面艦隊, Nansei Hōmen Kantai) was a fleet of the Imperial Japanese Navy established during World War II.

== History ==
The Southwest Area Fleet was an operational command of the Imperial Japanese Navy established on April 10, 1942, to coordinate naval, air, and ground forces for the invasion, occupation and defense of the Philippines, French Indochina, Malaya, and the Netherlands East Indies.

The 1st, 2nd, 3rd and 4th Southern Expeditionary Fleets and the IJN 13th Air Fleet were under operational control of the Southwest Area Fleet.

After February 1945, the headquarters of the Southwest Area Fleet was isolated in the Philippines, and the IJN 10th Area Fleet was created in Singapore to take over operational command of its surviving forces, with the exception of the 3rd Southern Expeditionary Fleet, which was also trapped in the Philippines. Through fierce fighting during the American re-occupation of the Philippines, especially in Manila, Cebu and Mindanao, the surviving elements of the Southwest Area Fleet and the 3rd Southern Expeditionary Fleet were largely annihilated by the end of May 1945.

== Organization ==
- Southwest Area Fleet (HQ Manila)
  - First Expeditionary Fleet (Singapore)
  - Second Expeditionary Fleet (Surabaya)
  - Third Expeditionary Fleet (Manila)
  - Fourth Expeditionary Fleet (Ambon)
  - IJN 13th Air Fleet

== Commanders of the IJN Southwest Fleet ==
	Commander in chief	Dates		Previous Post	Next Post	Notes
1	Vice-Admiral; Takahashi Ibō 高橋伊望	10 April 1942	15 September 1942	Commander-in-chief; 3rd Fleet		Also Commander-in-chief; 2nd Southern Exepeditionary Fleet
2	Vice-Admiral; Takasu Shirō 高須四郎	15 September 1942	18 June 1944	Attendant; Navy General Staff	Naval Councilor	Also Commander-in-chief; 2nd Southern Exepeditionary Fleet until 15 April 1943
3	Vice-Admiral; Mikawa Gunichi 三川軍一	18 June 1944	1 November 1944			
4	Vice-Admiral; Ōkawachi Denshichi	1 November 1944	15 September 1945			

Chief of staff

	Rank	Name	Date
1	Vice-Admiral	Toshihisa Nakamura	10 Apr 1942 – 10 Oct 1942
2	Vice-Admiral	Takeo Tada	10 Oct 1942 – 15 Mar 1944
3	Rear-Admiral	Hidehiko Nishio	15 Mar 1944 – 1 Nov 1944
4	Vice-Admiral	Kaoru Arima	1 Nov 1944 – 6 Sep 1945
