= Southern Expeditionary Fleet (Imperial Japanese Navy) =

Japanese Navy fleet during WWII

The Southern Expeditionary Fleet (南遣艦隊, Nanken Kantai) was a fleet of the Imperial Japanese Navy, their roles were invasion and maintenance of the public order in southwestern area the French Indochina, Philippines, British Malaya and Dutch East Indies.

== Organization ==
=== Southern Expeditionary Fleet/1st Southern Expeditionary Fleet ===
The Southern Expeditionary Fleet was organized for Invasion of French Indochina on 31 July 1941. Describe the 1st Southern Expeditionary Fleet (第一南遣艦隊, Dai-Ichi Nanken Kantai) also. Their jurisdiction area was French Indochina, Singapore and westward.

- Structure (extract)

Date	Highest unit	Higher unit	Fleet name	Lower units, vessels and elements
31 July 1941 (original)	Imperial General Headquarters		Southern Expeditionary Fleet	Cruiser Kashii, Coast defence ship Shimushu
10 December 1941	Combined Fleet		Southern Expeditionary Fleet	Cruiser Kashii, Coast defence ship Shimushu, 9th Base Force, 11th Special Base Force
3 January 1942	Combined Fleet		1st Southern Expeditionary Fleet (renamed)	Cruiser Kashii, Coast defence ship Shimushu, 9th Base Force, 11th Special Base Force
10 April 1942	Combined Fleet	Southwest Area Fleet	1st Southern Expeditionary Fleet	Cruiser Kashii, Coast defence ship Shimushu, Minelayer Katsuriki, C.M. Seaplane tender Sagara Maru, 5th Destroyer Division, 9th Base Force, 10th Special Base Force, 11th Special Base Force, 12th Special Base Force, 40th Naval Air Group, 3rd Surveying Unit
1 November 1942	Combined Fleet	Southwest Area Fleet	1st Southern Expeditionary Fleet	Cruiser Kashii, Escort ship Shimushu, Survey ship Katsuriki, C.M. Seaplane tender Sagara Maru, 5th Destroyer Division, 9th Special Base Force, 10th Special Base Force, 11th Special Base Force, 12th Special Base Force, 936th Naval Air Group, 3rd Surveying Unit
15 August 1944	Combined Fleet	Southwest Area Fleet	1st Southern Expeditionary Fleet	Minelayer Yaeyama, Destroyer Amatsukaze; 9th Special Base Force, 10th Special Base Force, 11th Special Base Force, 12th Special Base Force, 13th Special Base Force, 15th Base Force, 11th Naval Air Group, 12th Naval Air Group, 13th Naval Air Group, 936th Naval Air Group
5 February 1945	Combined Fleet	10th Area Fleet	1st Southern Expeditionary Fleet	Cruiser Myōkō, Takao, Destroyer Amatsukaze, Auxiliary submarine chaser No. 59, 9th Special Base Force, 10th Special Base Force, 11th Special Base Force, 12th Special Base Force, 13th Special Base Force, 15th Base Force
12 September 1945	Surrendered.			

- Commander in chief

	Rank	Name	Date	Note, additional post
1	Vice-Admiral	Noboru Hirata	31 July 1941	
2	Vice-Admiral	Jisaburō Ozawa	18 October 1941	
3	Vice-Admiral	Denshichi Ōkawachi	14 July 1942	
4	Vice-Admiral	Minoru Tayui	20 September 1943; 8 January 1945	Commander in chief of the 13th Air Fleet
5	Vice-Admiral	Shigeru Fukudome	13 January 1945; 5 February 1945	Commander in chief of the 13th Air Fleet; Commander of the 10th Area Fleet and 13th Air Fleet

- Chief of staff

	Rank	Name	Date	Note, additional post
1	Captain; Rear-Admiral	Torao Sawada	31 July 1941; 15 October 1941	
2	Captain; Rear-Admiral	Kiyoshi Hamada	20 June 1942; 1 November 1942	
3	Rear-Admiral	Shin'ichi Torigoe	27 August 1943	
4	Rear-Admiral	Bunji Asakura	16 August 1944; 8 January 1945; 5 February 1945	Chief of staff of the 13th Air Fleet; Chief of staff of the 10th Area Fleet and 13th Air Fleet

=== 2nd Southern Expeditionary Fleet ===
The 2nd Southern Expeditionary Fleet (第二南遣艦隊, Dai-Ni Nanken Kantai) was reorganized from 3rd Fleet on 10 March 1942. Describe 3rd Fleet about predecessor of the 2nd Southern Expeditionary Fleet. Their jurisdiction area was Dutch East Indies.

- Structure (extract)

Date	Highest unit	Higher unit	Fleet name	Lower units, vessels and elements
10 April 1941 (original)	Combined Fleet		3rd Fleet	16th Division, 17th Division, 5th Torpedo Division, 12th Air Flotilla, 1st Base Force, 2nd Base Force
10 December 1941	Combined Fleet		3rd Fleet	16th Division, 17th Division, 5th Torpedo Division, 6th Submarine Squadron, 12th Air Flotilla, 1st Base Force, 2nd Base Force, 32nd Special Base Force, C.M. Repair ship Yamabiko Maru, C.M. Water supply ship Kōan Maru, C.M. Freighter Senkō Maru
10 March 1942	Combined Fleet	Southwest Area Fleet	2nd Southern Expeditionary Fleet (renamed and reorganized)	Cruiser Ashigara, Minelayer Itsukushima, Survey ship Tsukushi, 16th Division, 2nd Gunboat Division, 21st Special Base Force, 22nd Special Base Force, 23rd Special Base Force, 24th Special Base Force, C.M. Seaplane tender San'yō Maru, 9th Surveying Unit
1 September 1943	Combined Fleet	Southwest Area Fleet	2nd Southern Expeditionary Fleet	Minelayer Itsukushima, Patrol boat No. 102, No. 104, 16th Division, 21st Special Base Force, 22nd Special Base Force, 23rd Special Base Force, 24th Special Base Force, 25th Special Base Force, C.M. Gunboat Ban'yō Maru, Okuyō Maru, Taikō Maru, 934th Naval Air Group
5 February 1945	Combined Fleet	10th Area Fleet	2nd Southern Expeditionary Fleet	Patrol boat No. 102, No. 106, No. 109, 21st Special Base Force, 22nd Special Base Force, 23rd Special Base Force, C.M. Gunboat Ban'yō Maru, 31st Naval Air Group
3 September 1945	Surrendered.			

- Commander in chief

	Rank	Name	Date	Note, additional post
1	Vice-Admiral	Ibō Takahashi	10 April 1941; 10 March 1942	Commander in chief of the Southwest Area Fleet
2	Vice-Admiral	Shirō Takasu	15 September 1942	Commander in chief of the Southwest Area Fleet
3	Vice-Admiral	Seiichi Iwamura	15 April 1943	
4	Vice-Admiral	Gun'ichi Mikawa	3 September 1943	
5	Vice-Admiral	Shiro Kawase	18 June 1944	
6	Vice-Admiral	Yaichirō Shibata	29 January 1945	

- Chief of staff

	Rank	Name	Date	Note, additional post
1	Rear-Admiral	Toshihisa Nakamura	10 April 1941; 10 March 1942	Chief of staff of the Southwest Area Fleet
2	Rear-Admiral	Takeo Tada	10 April 1942	Chief of staff of the Southwest Area Fleet
3	Captain; Rear-Admiral	Akira Matsuzaki	15 April 1943; 1 May 1943	
4	Rear-Admiral	Shinzaburō Hase	19 January 1945	

=== 3rd Southern Expeditionary Fleet ===
The 3rd Southern Expeditionary Fleet (第三南遣艦隊, Dai-San Nanken Kantai) was organized on 3 January 1942 for invasion of the Philippines.

- Structure (extract)

Date	Highest unit	Higher unit	Lower units, vessels and elements
3 January 1942 (original)	Combined Fleet		Cruiser Kuma, Minelayer Yaeyama, 1st Escort Division, 31st Special Base Force, 32nd Special Base Force, C.M. Seaplane tender Sanuki Maru, C.M. Minelayer Nichiyū Maru, C.M. Survey ship Kyōodō Maru No. 36
14 July 1942	Combined Fleet	Southwest Area Fleet	Cruiser Kuma, 31st Special Base Force, 32nd Special Base Force, C.M. Seaplane tender Sanuki Maru, C.M. Minelayer Nichiyū Maru, C.M. Survey ship Kyōodō Maru No. 36, 31st Naval Air Group, 2nd Surveying Unit
1 September 1943	Combined Fleet	Southwest Area Fleet	Minelayer Yaeyama, Gunboat Karatsu, 32nd Special Base Force, 954th Naval Air Group, 31st Guard Unit, 31st Communication Unit
15 August 1944	Combined Fleet	Southwest Area Fleet	Minelayer Tsugaru, Gunboat Karatsu, Torpedo boat Hayabusa, Patrol boat No. 103, No. 105, Submarine chaser No. 36, No. 45, No. 46, C.M. Gunboat Kiso Maru, 30th Special Base Force, 32nd Special Base Force, 33rd Special Base Force, 31st Naval Air Group, 32nd Naval Air Group, 31st Guard Unit, 31st Communication Unit
1 June 1945	Supreme Headquarter of the Navy	Southwest Area Fleet	30th Special Base Force, 31st Special Base Force, 32nd Special Base Force, 33rd Special Base Force, 21st Submarine chaser Division, 955th Naval Air Group
3 September 1945	Surrendered.		

- Commander in chief

	Rank	Name	Date	Note, additional post
1	Vice-Admiral	Rokuzō Sugiyama	3 January 1942	
2	Vice-Admiral	Taiji Ōta	1 December 1942	
3	Vice-Admiral	Arata Oka	20 September 1943	
4	Vice-Admiral	Gun'ichi Mikawa	15 August 1944	Commander in chief of the Southweat Area Fleet and 13th Air Fleet
5	Vice-Admiral	Denshichi Ōkawachi	1 November 1944; 8 January 1945	Commander in chief of the Southweat Area Fleet and 13th Air Fleet; Commander in chief of the Southweat Area Fleet

- Chief of staff

	Rank	Name	Date	Note, additional post
1	Rear-Admiral	Yasuichirō Kondō	3 January 1942	
2	Captain; Rear-Admiral	Shōzō Hashimoto	11 August 1943; 1 May 1943	
3	Rear-Admiral	Hisagorō Shimamoto	27 July 1944	
4	Rear-Admiral	Kaoru Arima	1 November 1944; 17 November 1944; 5 February 1945	Chief of staff of the Southwest Area Fleet, 13th Air Fleet and commander of the 32nd Special Base Force; Chief of staff of the Southwest Area Fleet and 13th Air Fleet; Chief of staff of the Southwest Area Fleet

=== 4th Southern Expeditionary Fleet ===
The 4th Southern Expeditionary Fleet (第四南遣艦隊, Dai-Yon Nanken Kantai) was independent from 2nd Southern Expeditionary Fleet for maintenance of the public order in western New Guinea on 30 November 1943. Dissolved on 10 March 1945, their remaining units were unified to 10th Area Fleet.

- Structure (extract)

Date	Highest unit	Higher unit	Lower units, vessels and elements
30 November 1943 (original)	Combined Fleet	Southwest Area Fleet	Minelayer Itsukushima, 24th Special Base Force, 25th Special Base Force, 26th Special Base Force, 934th Naval Air Group
1 March 1945	Combined Fleet	Southwest Area Fleet	25th Special Base Force, 26th Special Base Force, 28th Special Base Force
10 March 1945	Dissolved.		

- Commander in chief

	Rank	Name	Date	Note, additional post
1	Vice-Admiral	Seigō Yamagata	30 November 1943	

- Chief of staff

	Rank	Name	Date	Note, additional post
1	Rear-Admiral	Tametsugu Okada	30 November 1943	

== Bibliography ==
- Senshi Sōsho, Asagumo Simbun (Japan)
  - Vol. 91, Combined Fleet #1, "Until outbreak of war", 1975
  - Vol. 80, Combined Fleet #2, "Until June 1942", 1975
  - Vol. 77, Combined Fleet #3, "Until February 1943", 1974
  - Vol. 39, Combined Fleet #4, "First part of the Third step Operations", 1970
  - Vol. 71, Combined Fleet #5, "Middle part of the Third step Operations", 1974
  - Vol. 45, Combined Fleet #6, "Latter part of the Third step Operations", 1971
  - Vol. 93, Combined Fleet #7, "Last part of the War", 1976
- Rekishi Dokuhon, Special issue No. 33 Overview of admirals of the Imperial Japanese Navy, Shin-Jinbutsuōraisha, 1999
- The Japanese Modern Historical Manuscripts Association, Organizations, structures and personnel affairs of the Imperial Japanese Army & Navy, University of Tokyo Press, 1971 ISBN 978-4-13-036009-8
