= List of Air Fleets of the Imperial Japanese Navy =

During the Pacific War of 1941–1945, the Imperial Japanese Navy Air Service placed into service an increasing number of "air fleets" — airborne combat units attached to the Navy. The 1st Air Fleet was the primary carrier unit, while other Air Fleets were for defence, training or supporting naval operations in particular theatres.

== 1st Air Fleet ==
The 1st Air Fleet (第一航空艦隊, Dai-Ichi Kōkū Kantai) formed the primary carrier fleet of the Imperial Japanese Navy (IJN), a grouping of naval aircraft and aircraft carriers that at the time of the attack on Pearl Harbor, was the world's largest aircraft carrier fleet. As losses mounted, the carriers were removed and the 1st Air Fleet was transformed into a land based Naval aviation force forward based on islands and land masses along the perimeter of the Japanese controlled sphere.

== 2nd Air Fleet ==
The 2nd Air Fleet (第二航空艦隊, Dai-Ni Kōkū Kantai) was organized late in the War to defend the National Defence Zone along with 1st Air Fleet. Their area of responsibility was based in the Kyūshū-Okinawa-Formosa district. In October 1944 Vice admiral Shigeru Fukudome moved his HQ from Taiwan to Manila. There he was reinforced and charged with a share of the air defense of the Philippines. However, most of the airplanes and pilots disappeared in November 1944 as a result of fighting against the Halsey Fleet from the front during the Philippines campaign. Soon thereafter, in Jan 1945, the 2nd Air Fleet was dissolved and merged into the 1st Air Fleet.

Structure (extract)
Date	Higher unit	Lower units
15 June 1944 (original)	Imperial General Headquarters	141st NAG, 345th NAG, 762nd NAG
10 July 1944	Combined Fleet	21st Air Flotilla, 25th Air Flotilla, 141st NAG, 221st NAG, 341st NAG, 762nd NAG, 763rd NAG, Kyūshū NAG
8 January 1945	disbanded	

Commander in chief
	Rank	Name	Date	Note, additional post
1	Vice-Admiral	Shigeru Fukudome	15 June 1944	

Chief of staff
	Rank	Name	Date	Note, additional post
1	Rear-Admiral	Ushie Sugimoto	15 June 1944	
2	Rear-Admiral	Tomozō Kikuchi	27 October 1944	

== 3rd Air Fleet ==
The 3rd Air Fleet (第三航空艦隊, Dai-San Kōkū Kantai) was in charge of air defense of Eastern Japan.

Structure (extract)
Date	Higher unit	Lower units
10 July 1944 (original)	Combined Fleet	27th Air Flotilla
15 December 1944	Combined Fleet	25th Air Flotilla, 27th Air Flotilla, 131st NAG, 210th NAG, 252 NAG, 343rd NAG, 601st NAG, 706th NAG, 722nd NAG, 752nd NAG, 801st NAG 1023rd NAG
25 May 1945	Combined Fleet	13th Air Flotilla, 25th Air Flotilla, 27th Air Flotilla
15 October 1945	disbanded	

Commander in chief
	Rank	Name	Date	Note, additional post
1	Vice-Admiral	Shun'ichi Kira	10 July 1944	
2	Vice-Admiral	Kinpei Teraoka	17 November 1944	
3	Vice-Admiral	Sadayoshi Yamada	26 August 1945	
x	vacant post		1 October 1945	

Chief of staff
	Rank	Name	Date	Note, additional post
1	Rear-Admiral	Kanzō Miura	10 July 1944	WIA on 30 July 1944
x	vacant post		31 July 1944	
2	Captain	Tarō Taguchi	1 August 1944	
x	vacant post		26 December 1944	
3	Captain	Chūzaburō Yamazumi	1 January 1945	
4	Captain	Chihaya Takahashi	26 August 1945	
x	vacant post		1 October 1945	

== 5th Air Fleet ==
The 5th Air Fleet (第五航空艦隊, Dai-Go Kōkū Kantai) was in charge of the air defense of Western Japan.

Structure (extract)
Date	Higher unit	Lower units
10 February 1945 (original)	Combined Fleet	203rd NAG, 701st NAG, 721st NAG, 762nd NAG, 801st NAG, 1022nd NAG, Kyūshū NAG, Nansei-Shotō NAG
25 May 1945	Combined Fleet	12th Air Flotilla, 72nd Air Flotilla, Takuma NAG, 171st NAG, 634th NAG, 701st NAG, 721st NAG, 762nd NAG, 801st NAG, 931st NAG; Kyūshū NAG, San'in NAG, Nansei-Shotō NAG, Naikai NAG, Saikai NAG
10 October 1945	disbanded	

Commander in chief
	Rank	Name	Date	Note, additional post
1	Vice-Admiral	Matome Ugaki	10 February 1945	KIA on 15 August 1945
x	vacant post		16 August 1945	
2	Vice-Admiral	Ryūnosuke Kusaka	17 August 1945	

Chief of staff
	Rank	Name	Date	Note, additional post
1	Captain; Rear-Admiral	Toshiyuki Yokoi	10 February 1945; 1 May 1945	

== 10th Air Fleet ==
The 10th Air Fleet (第十航空艦隊, Dai-Jū Kōkū Kantai) was a training unit.

Structure (extract)
Date	Higher unit	Lower units
1 March 1945 (original)	Combined Fleet	11th CAG, 12th CAG, 13th CAG
1 June 1945	Combined Fleet	Kasumigaura NAG, Yatabe NAG, Hyakurihara NAG, Jinmachi NAG, 2nd Kōriyama NAG, Matsushima NAG, Tōkyō NAG, Genzan NAG
10 October 1945	disbanded	

Commander in chief
	Rank	Name	Date	Note, additional post
1	Vice-Admiral	Minoru Maeda	1 March 1945	
x	vacant post		1 October 1945	

Chief of staff
	Rank	Name	Date	Note, additional post
1	Rear-Admiral	Chikao Yamamoto	1 March 1945	
2	Captain; Rear-Admiral	Shigenori Kami	20 June 1945; 15 September 1945	LODD on 15 September 1945
x	vacant post		16 September 1945	

== 11th Air Fleet ==
The 11th Air Fleet (第十一航空艦隊, Dai-Jūichi Kōkū Kantai) was a grouping of naval aviation and surface units based in Formosa that moved through the Philippines and New Guinea then supported the Solomon Islands campaign during the Japanese advance at the start of the war. Heavily engaged in the Guadalcanal Campaign. From the end of 1942 they provided air cover to the Southeast Area Fleet.

== 12th Air Fleet ==
The 12th Air Fleet (第十二航空艦隊, Dai-Jūni Kōkū Kantai) was in charge of air cover for the Northeast Area Fleet.

Structure (extract)
Date	Higher unit	Lower units
18 May 1943 (original)	Combined Fleet	No units, they were existence only in the documents.
5 August 1943	Northeast Area Fleet	24th Air Flotilla, 27th Air Flotilla, 51st Air Flotilla, Horomushiro Communication Unit, 5th Weather Observation Unit
1 April 1944	Northeast Area Fleet	27th Air Flotilla, 51st Air Flotilla, Horomushiro Communication Unit, 5th Weather Observation Unit, 41st Air Base Unit
5 December 1944	Combined Fleet	452nd NAG, Hokutō NAG, Chishima Base Force
1 March 1945	Combined Fleet	Hokutō NAG, Chishima Base Force
30 November 1945	disbanded	

Commander in chief
	Rank	Name	Date	Note, additional post
1	Vice-Admiral	Michitarō Tozuka	18 May 1943	
1	Vice-Admiral	Michitarō Tozuka	5 August 1943	Commander in chief of the Northeast Area Fleet
2	Vice-Admiral	Eiji Gotō	15 September 1944	Commander in chief of the Northeast Area Fleet
2	Vice-Admiral	Eiji Gotō	5 December 1944	
2	Vice-Admiral	Eiji Gotō	15 February 1945	Commander in chief of the Ōminato Guard District
3	Vice-Admiral	Kanji Ugaki	15 March 1945	Commander in chief of the Ōminato Guard District
x	vacant post		1 October 1945	

Chief of staff
	Rank	Name	Date	Note, additional post
1	Rear-Admiral	Yoshiyuki Ichimiya	18 May 1943	
1	Rear-Admiral	Yoshiyuki Ichimiya	5 August 1943	Chief of staff of the Northeast Area Fleet
1	Rear-Admiral	Yoshiyuki Ichimiya	5 December 1944	
2	Rear-Admiral	Tsuyoshi Matsumoto	6 February 1945	
3	Rear-Admiral	Zensuke Kanome	15 February 1945	Chief of staff of the Ōminato Guard District; Commander of the Ōminato Transportation Department
x	vacant post		1 October 1945	

== 13th Air Fleet ==
The 13th Air Fleet (第十三航空艦隊, Dai-Jūsan Kōkū Kantai) was in charge of air cover for the Southwest Area Fleet.

Structure (extract)
Date	Higher unit	Lower units
20 September 1943 (original)	Combined Fleet	No units, they were existence only in the documents.
1 January 1944	Southwest Area Fleet	23rd Air Flotilla, 28th Air Flotilla, 732nd NAG
15 August 1944	Southwest Area Fleet	28th Air Flotilla, 381st NAG, 102nd Air Base Unit, 104th Air Base Unit
15 December 1944	Southwest Area Fleet	28th Air Flotilla, Malay NAG, Tōin NAG
5 February 1945	10th Area Fleet	23rd Air Flotilla, 28th Air Flotilla, 11th AG, 12th AG, 13th AG, 31st AG, 936th NAG, Malay NAG, Tōin NAG
1 June 1945	10th Area Fleet	28th Air Flotilla, 31st AG, 381st NAG
12 September 1945	Surrendered to United Kingdom in Singapore.	

Commander in chief
	Rank	Name	Date	Note, additional post
1	Vice-Admiral; Admiral	Shirō Takasu	20 September 1943; 1 March 1944	Commander in chief of the Southwest Area Fleet and the 2nd Southern Expeditionary Fleet
2	Vice-Admiral	Gun'ichi Mikawa	18 July 1944	Commander in chief of the Southwest Area Fleet
2	Vice-Admiral	Gun'ichi Mikawa	15 August 1944	Commander in chief of the Southwest Area Fleet and the 3rd Southern Expeditionary Fleet
3	Vice-Admiral	Denshichi Ōkawachi	1 November 1944	Commander in chief of the Southwest Area Fleet and the 3rd Southern Expeditionary Fleet
4	Vice-Admiral	Minoru Tayui	8 January 1945	Commander in chief of the IJN 1st Southern Expeditionary Fleet
5	Vice-Admiral	Shigeru Fukudome	13 January 1945	IJN 1st Southern Expeditionary Fleet
5	Vice-Admiral	Shigeru Fukudome	5 February 1945	Commander in chief of the 10th Area Fleet and the IJN 1st Southern Expeditionary Fleet

Chief of staff
	Rank	Name	Date	Note, additional post
1	Rear-Admiral; Vice-Admiral	Takeo Tada	20 September 1943; 1 November 1943	Chief of staff of the Southwest Area Fleet and the 2nd Southern Expeditionary Fleet
2	Rear-Admiral; Vice-Admiral	Hidehiko Nishio	1 March 1944; 15 October 1944	Chief of staff of the Southwest Area Fleet
3	Rear-Admiral	Kaoru Arima	1 November 1944	Chief of staff of the Southwest Area Fleet and the 3rd Southern Expeditionary Fleet; Commander of the 31st Special Base Force
3	Rear-Admiral	Kaoru Arima	17 November 1944	Chief of staff of the Southwest Area Fleet and 3rd Southern Expeditionary Fleet
4	Rear-Admiral	Bunji Asakura	8 January 1945	Chief of staff of the IJN 1st Southern Expeditionary Fleet
4	Rear-Admiral	Bunji Asakura	5 February 1945	Chief of staff of the 10th Area Fleet and the IJN 1st Southern Expeditionary Fleet

== 14th Air Fleet ==
The 14th Air Fleet (第十四航空艦隊, Dai-Jūyon Kōkū Kantai) was in charge of air cover for the Central Pacific Area.

Structure (extract)
Date	Higher unit	Lower units
4 March 1944 (original)	Central Pacific Area Fleet	22nd Air Flotilla, 26th Air Flotilla, Seaplane tender Akitsushima
5 May 1944	Central Pacific Area Fleet	Seaplane tender Akitsushima
8 July 1944	HQ was annihilated	
18 July 1944	disbanded	

Commander in chief
	Rank	Name	Date	Note, additional post
1	Vice-Admiral; Admiral	Chūichi Nagumo	4 March 1944; 8 July 1944	Commander in chief of the Central Pacific Area Fleet; KIA on 8 July 1944
x	vacant post		9 July 1944	

Chief of staff
	Rank	Name	Date	Additional post
1	Rear-Admiral; Vice-Admiral	Hideo Yano	4 March 1944; 8 July 1944	Chief of staff of the Central Pacific Area Fleet; KIA on 8 July 1944
x	vacant post		9 July 1944	
