= Matome Ugaki =

Imperial Japanese Navy admiral (1890–1945)

- 宇垣 纏
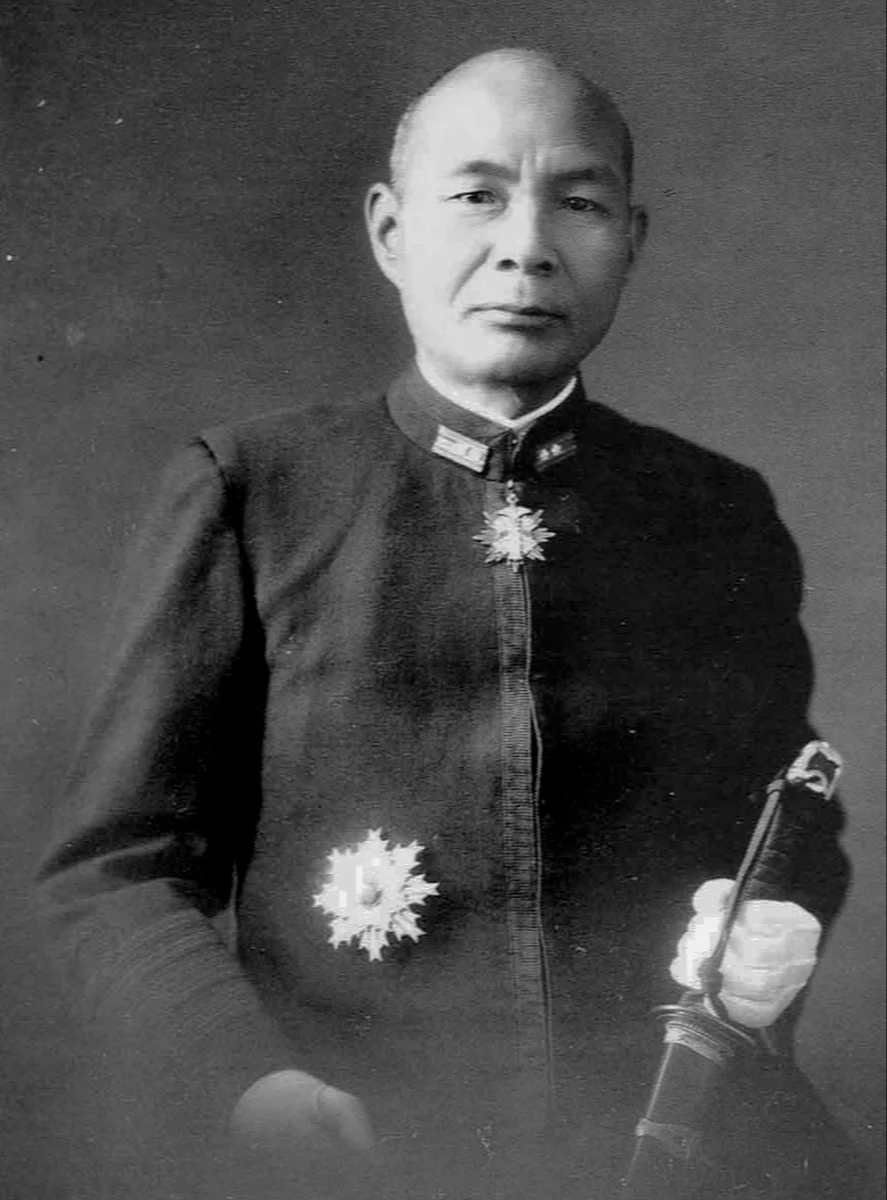
- Vice Admiral Ugaki Matome (1942–45)
- Born: 15 February 1890; Okayama, Okayama, Japan
- Died: 15 August 1945 (aged 55) off Okinawa, Japan
- Military career
- Allegiance: Empire of Japan
- Branch: Imperial Japanese Navy
- Service years: 1912–1945
- Rank: Vice Admiral
- Commands: Yakumo, Hyūga, Naval Operations Bureau, 8th Squadron, 1st Squadron, 5th Air Fleet
- Conflicts: World War I; Second Sino-Japanese War; World War II; Battle of the Philippine Sea; Battle of Leyte Gulf; Battle of the Sibuyan Sea; Battle off Samar; Japan campaign; Volcano and Ryukyu Islands campaign; Battle of Okinawa

Matome Ugaki (宇垣 纏, Ugaki Matome; 15 February 1890 – 15 August 1945) was an admiral in the Imperial Japanese Navy during World War II, remembered for his extensive and revealing war diary, role at the Battle of Leyte Gulf, and participation in one of the final kamikaze attacks hours after the surrender of Japan was announced.

== Biography ==
=== Early career ===
Born to a farming family in rural Akaiwa District, Okayama (now part of Okayama city, Okayama prefecture), Ugaki entered the Imperial Japanese Naval Academy on 11 September 1909 and graduated in its 40th class on 17 July 1912. He placed ninth out of 144 cadets in his class, and was good friends with his Naval Academy classmates Tamon Yamaguchi and Yoshio Suzuki, both of whom were killed in action during World War II. He served as a midshipman on the armored cruiser Azuma and made a training cruise to Australia aboard her.

On 1 May 1913, he was transferred to the protected cruiser Hirado and was commissioned as ensign on 1 December 1913. He was assigned to the battlecruiser Ibuki on 27 May 1914.

=== World War I ===
Japan entered World War I on the side of the Allies on 23 August 1914. During the early weeks of the war, Ibuki, with Ugaki aboard, participated in the Allied search for the Imperial German Navy light cruiser SMS Emden in the Indian Ocean, joined the Royal Navy armoured cruiser HMS Minotaur and protected cruiser HMS Pyramus in escorting a convoy carrying the main body of the New Zealand Expeditionary Force from New Zealand across the Tasman Sea and to Albany, Western Australia, and along with the Royal Australian Navy light cruiser HMAS Sydney escorted a convoy carrying the Australian and New Zealand Army Corps across the Indian Ocean from Australia to the Middle East. Ugaki was promoted to sub-lieutenant on 1 December 1915 while aboard Ibuki.

Ugaki subsequently transferred to the battlecruiser Kongō on 1 December 1916. Kongō experimented with handling airplanes and operated off China during his tour. On 10 September 1917, he reported aboard the armored cruiser Iwate, and aboard her made a training cruise in company with the armored cruiser Asama to the west coast of North America with the Japanese Naval Academy's 45th class aboard between 2 March and 6 July 1918. He was reassigned to the destroyer Nara on 1 August 1918, and was aboard her when the war ended on 11 November 1918.

=== Interwar ===
After his promotion to lieutenant on 1 December 1918, Ugaki attended the Naval Gunnery School, and subsequently was assigned as chief gunnery officer to the destroyer Minekaze on 1 December 1919 before returning to Kongō on 1 December 1921 as secondary gunnery officer. During his tour aboard her, Kongō operated off Dairen and Qingdao, China, and St. Vladimir Bay, Russia, and visited Chinhae, Korea.

On 1 December 1922, Ugaki entered the Japanese Naval War College (海軍大学校, Kaigun Daigakkō; short form: Kaidai (海大)). In 1924, he graduated in its 22nd class, and on 1 December 1924 he was promoted to lieutenant commander and began a stint as gunnery officer aboard the light cruiser Ōi. On 1 December 1925, he became a staff officer on the Imperial Japanese Navy General Staff and served for nearly three years as a staff member of the Naval Gunnery School. On 15 November 1928 he was appointed as a resident officer in Germany, and he was promoted to commander on 10 December 1928.

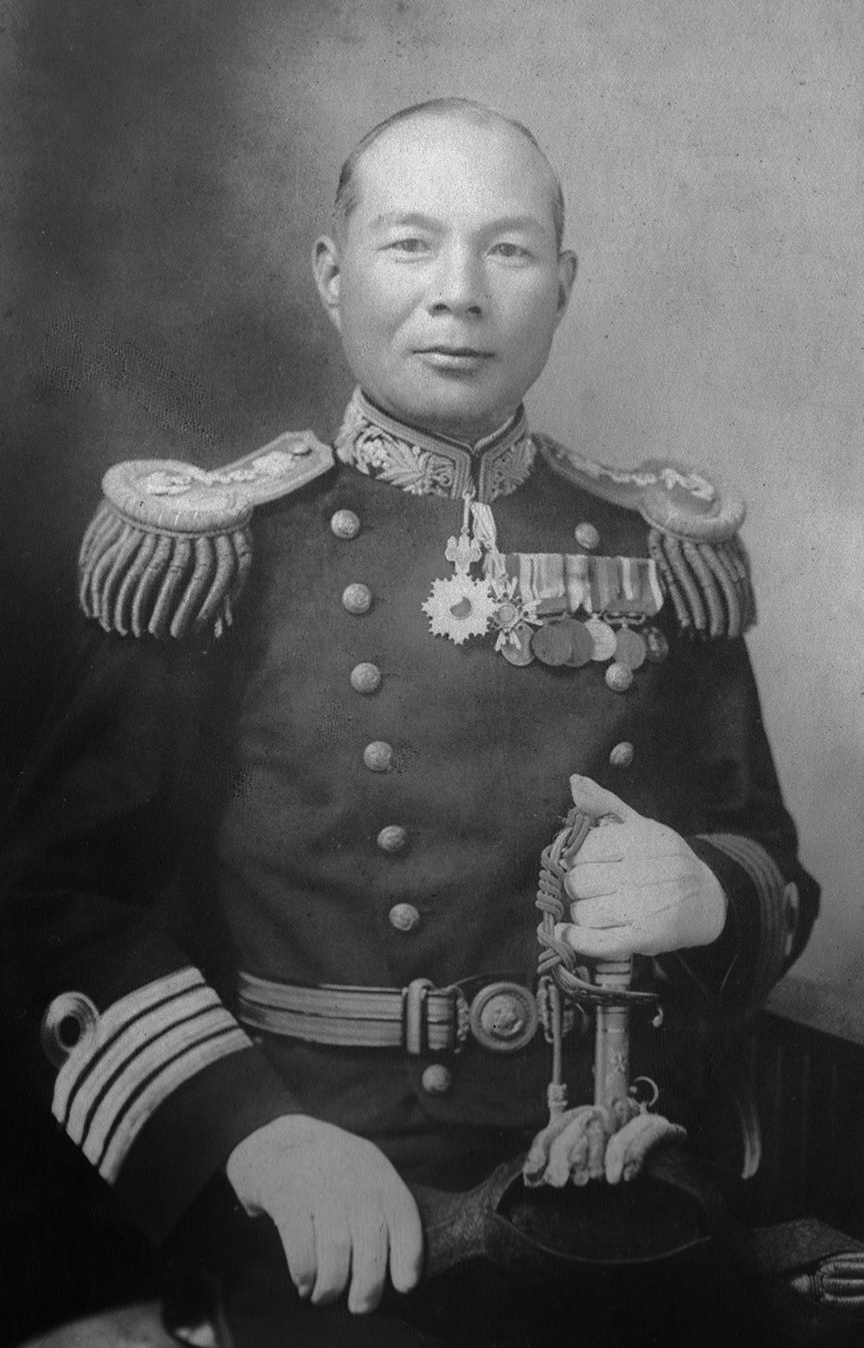
Ugaki as captain 1932–38.

Ordered back to Japan on 1 November 1930, Ugaki returned to sea in an assignment as a staff officer in the 3rd Cruiser Division on 1 December 1930, and then became a staff officer in the 2nd Fleet on 1 December 1931. Ugaki became an instructor at the Naval War College on 15 November 1932 and received a promotion to captain on 1 December 1932. On 30 October 1935, Ugaki was assigned to duty as a staff officer to the Combined Fleet, then received his first command on 1 December 1936 as commanding officer of the training ship Yakumo, From 7 June to 19 October 1937, Yakumo made a training cruise to Suez and the Mediterranean under his command with the 64th class of the Japanese Naval Academy embarked. On 1 December 1937, he took command of the battleship Hyūga, which operated as part of the Japanese blockade of the southern coast of China during the Second Sino-Japanese War.

Ugaki was promoted to rear admiral on 15 November 1938 and became Director, 1st Bureau (Operations) on the Naval General Staff on 15 December 1938. He took command of the 8th Cruiser Division, consisting of the heavy cruisers Tone and Chikuma, on 10 April 1941. In August 1941, Ugaki was appointed Chief-of-Staff of the Combined Fleet under Admiral Isoroku Yamamoto, a position he held until Yamamoto's death.

=== World War II ===
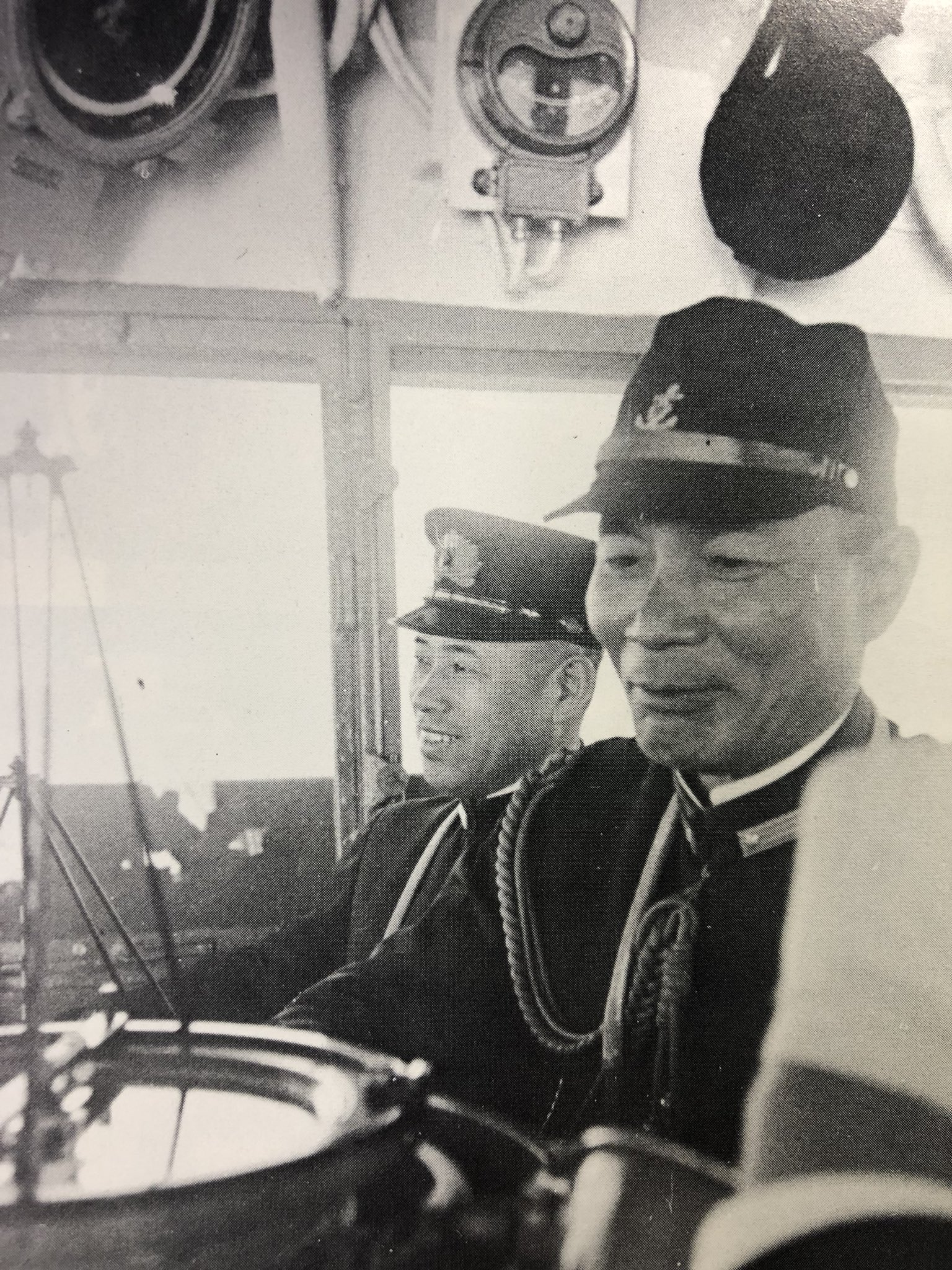
Yamamoto and Ugaki on the bridge of Combined Fleet flagship Nagato, August 1941 – February 1942

The Pacific campaign of World War II began with the Japanese attack on Pearl Harbor, Hawaii, on 7 December 1941 (8 December 1941 on the other side of the International Date Line in Japan), and Ugaki was promoted to vice admiral on 1 November 1942. Ugaki and Yamamoto were traveling in separate Mitsubishi G4M (Allied reporting name "Betty") bombers when United States Army Air Forces fighters shot down both aircraft over Bougainville in the Solomon Islands on 18 April 1943 in what the United States named "Operation Vengeance". Yamamoto was killed, his aircraft crashing in the jungle, while Ugaki's plane fell into the sea at high speed. Ugaki was one of three survivors, the others being the bomber's pilot, Flight Petty Officer 2nd Class Hiroshi Hayashi, and the Combined Fleet's Paymaster, Captain Motoharu Kitamura. On 22 May 1943, the injured Ugaki was attached to the Naval General Staff for hospitalization.

After recovering from his injuries, Ugaki took command of the 1st Battleship Division (consisting of Nagato, Yamato, and Musashi) on 25 February 1944, initially with Nagato as his flagship, then transferring his flag to Yamato in early May 1944. After U.S. forces landed on Biak on 27 May 1944, he argued forcefully that Japan had a strategic imperative to hold Biak, and at least partially as a result of his advocacy the Imperial Japanese Navy planned Operation Kon for the relief of the island and on 30 May 1944 created the Kon Force to carry out the operation. It gave Ugaki additional duty as overall commander of the Kon Force on 10 June 1944, and the Kon Force got underway from Tawi-Tawi in the Philippine Islands that day. but the operation was postponed on 12 June 1944 when the Marianas campaign began with the first U.S. bombardments of Saipan. Battleship Division 1 joined the Van Force of the Mobile Force as it deployed for the defense of the Mariana Islands. In the resulting Battle of the Philippine Sea Ugaki's battleships exchanged fire with U.S. Navy carrier aircraft while defending Japanese aircraft carriers on 20 June 1944 and emerged unscathed except for a strafing attack on Nagato. Operation Kon was canceled.

Ugaki subsequently commanded Battleship Division 1 during the disastrous Battle of Leyte Gulf of 23–26 October 1944. His battleships saw action in two major engagements of the battle, the Battle of the Sibuyan Sea on 24 October 1944, in which U.S. aircraft sank Musashi, and the Battle off Samar on 25 October 1944. In the latter action, Yamato and Nagato, the largest battleships in the Imperial Japanese Navy, inflicted only modest damage on U.S. Navy forces despite their own tremendous firepower advantage.

On 15 November 1944, Ugaki was recalled to Japan and ordered to duty with the Naval General Staff. On 10 February 1945, he was appointed commander of the 5th Air Fleet, based in Kyūshū and overseeing all naval aircraft in the region from his headquarters in a cave bunker to protect him from the growing threat of U.S. Army Air Forces B-29 Superfortress attacks. In March 1945, he launched a long-range strike by kamikaze aircraft against the U.S. fleet anchored at Ulithi Atoll. After the Battle of Okinawa began on 1 April 1945, he ordered the first waves of Operation Kikusui ("Chrysanthemum Water"), which involved hundreds of kamikaze attacks against U.S. Navy ships in the vicinity of Okinawa during April 1945. Though such air attacks continued throughout the Okinawa campaign and caused superficial damage and crew casualties to a great number of Allied vessels, no Allied warship larger than a destroyer were sunk directly by kamikazes during the spring of 1945.

Meanwhile, Ugaki gathered more aircraft and hid them from Allied attack in Kyushu, planning to use them in kamikaze attacks during the expected Allied invasion of Japan. Ugaki planned to hit the invasion forces with hundreds of aircraft and Shin'yō suicide attack motorboats over the course of a few hours in Operation Ketsu-Go (Decisive Operation).

=== Suicide ===
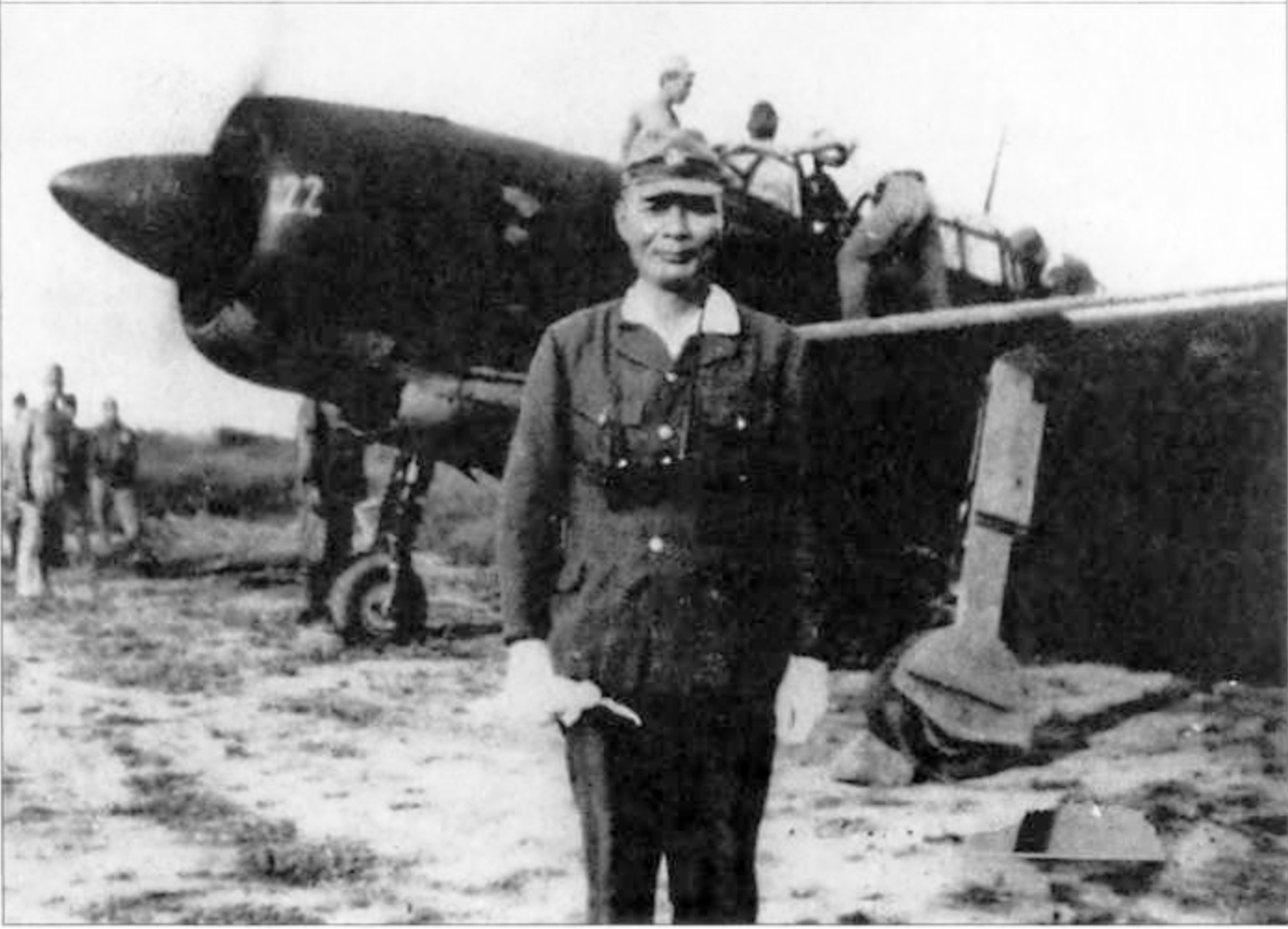
Ugaki on 15 August 1945 before his kamikaze mission.

On 15 August 1945, Emperor Hirohito made a radio announcement conceding defeat and calling for the military to lay down their arms. After listening to the announcement of Japan's defeat, Ugaki made the final entry in his diary noting that he had not yet received an official cease-fire order, and that as he alone was to blame for the failure of Japanese aviators to stop the American advance, he would fly one last mission himself to show the true spirit of bushido. His subordinates protested, and even after Ugaki had climbed into the back seat of a Yokosuka D4Y4 of the 701st Kokutai (Allied reporting name "Judy") dive bomber piloted by Lieutenant Tatsuo Nakatsuru, Warrant Officer Akiyoshi Endo—whose place in the kamikaze roster Ugaki had usurped—climbed into the same space that the admiral had already occupied. Thus, the aircraft containing Ugaki took off with three men (piloted by Lieutenant Nakatsuru, reconnaissance by Warrant Officer Endo, and Ugaki), as opposed to two each in the remaining ten aircraft. Prior to boarding his aircraft, Ugaki posed for pictures and removed his rank insignia from his dark green uniform, taking only a ceremonial short sword given to him by Admiral Yamamoto.

Elements of this last flight most likely followed the Ryukyu flyway southwest to the many small islands north of Okinawa, where U.S. forces were still on alert at the potential end of hostilities. Endo served as radioman during the mission, sending Ugaki's final messages, the last of which at 19:24 reported that the plane had begun its dive onto an American vessel. However, U.S. Navy records do not indicate any successful kamikaze attack on that day, and it is likely that all aircraft on the mission (with the exception of three that returned due to engine problems) crashed into the ocean, struck down by American anti-aircraft fire. Although there are no precise accounts of an intercept made by Navy or Marine fighters or Pacific Fleet surface units against enemy aircraft in this vicinity at the time of surrender, it is possible further research may reveal more detail as to which ships (if any) were attacked.

The next morning, the crew of LST-926 claimed to have found the still smoldering remains of a "cockpit" (implying a shootdown or violent ditching of some sort, but not the exact cause) with three bodies on the beach of Iheyajima Island. The third man, his head crushed and right arm missing, wore a dark green uniform and a short sword was found nearby. The sailors buried the bodies in the sand.

== Honors and awards ==
Military offices
Preceded by Toshihisa Nakamura	Yakumo; Commanding Officer; 1 December 1936 – 1 December 1937	Succeeded by Tadashige Daigo
Preceded by Minoru Tayui	Hyūga; Commanding Officer; 1 December 1937 – 15 November 1938	Succeeded by Shōji Nishimura
Preceded by Nobutake Kondō	Naval Operations Bureau; Director; 15 December 1938 – 10 April 1941	Succeeded by Shigeru Fukudome
Preceded by Seiichi Itō	8th Squadron; Commander-in-chief; 10 April – 1 August 1941	Succeeded by Hiroaki Abe
Preceded by Seiichi Itō	1st Fleet; Chief-of-staff; 1–11 August 1941	Succeeded by Kengo Kobayashi
Preceded by Seiichi Itō	Combined Fleet; Chief-of-staff; 1 August 1941 – 22 May 1943	Succeeded by Shigeru Fukudome
Preceded by Chūichi Nagumo	1st Squadron; Commander-in-chief; 25 February – 15 November 1944	Succeeded by Vacant; post last held by Seiichi Itō
Preceded by Fleet created	5th Air Fleet; Commander-in-chief; 10 February – 15 August 1945	Succeeded by Ryūnosuke Kusaka
