= World War II political cartoons =

Low's cartoon Rendezvous

Political cartoons produced during World War II by both Allied and Axis powers commented on the events, personalities, and politics of the war. Governments used them for propaganda and public information. while Individuals used them to expressed their own political views and preferences.

== History ==
During World War II, every major military power had propaganda offices that employed political cartoons to influence public opinion.

== Examples ==
Before the outbreak of war in Europe, Germany and the Soviet Union formed a pact to divide the intervening buffer zones between them, and started with the invasion of Poland. The New Zealand cartoonist, David Low, produced a famous cartoon about this for the Evening Standard which appeared on 20 September 1939. It ridiculed the way in which the relationship of Adolf Hitler and Joseph Stalin had changed from bitter enmity to courteous cooperation.

Arthur Szyk received recognition for his political cartoons during World War II. First lady Eleanor Roosevelt called him a "one-man army." Adolf Hitler even put a price on his head.

George G. Butterworth, "GeeBee", likewise was on Hitler's "death list" for his continued lambasting of the Reich. His cartoons were dropped by the RAF over Poland and Czechoslovakia as propaganda during the war.

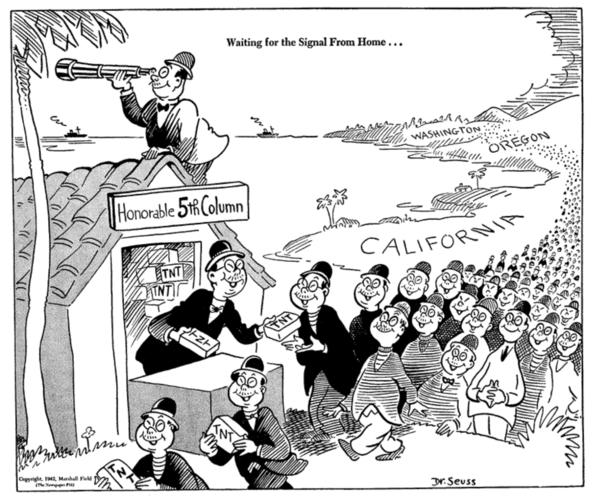
Dr. Seuss' "Waiting for the Signal from Home"

Dr. Seuss worked in an animation department of the U.S. Army, where he drew more than 400 political cartoons He published many political cartoons against Hitler and Mussolini, as well as Americans who were against American involvement. His cartoon, titled Waiting for the Signal From Home, published shortly before Franklin D. Roosevelt ordered Japanese American internment, and depicting West Coast Asians preparing dynamite attacks, was described by Donald Dewey as "particularly tasteless", and historian Richard Minear, in Dr. Seuss Goes to War (1999), criticized Dr Seuss's wartime cartoons and suggested that "racism was an ingredient in much if not all American wartime thinking about Japan."

The Punch cartoonist Fougasse produced a series of cartoons which the British Ministry of Information used on posters. These included a series to illustrate the slogan, Careless talk costs lives.

In the Soviet Union the style of cartooning was savage and unsubtle. Cartoons appeared in the satirical magazine, Krokodil. The byline "Kukryniksy" labeled the especially famous work of three artists, Mikhail Kupriyanov, Porfiri Krylov and Nikolai Sokolov, who worked together.

Vincent Krassousky, a Kiev-born émigré, produced pro-Nazi comics in occupied Paris. The French-language comic-strip series Marc le Téméraire [Marc the Bold] (1943) conveyed anti-communist and anti-English messages through the deeds of a collaborationist member of the Vichy Milice.

In contrast to official government-sponsored propaganda, German-occupied Europe also produced resistance cartoons mocking the new order.

== Italian cultural imperialism ==
During World War II Italy projected its culture into areas which it occupied in the Balkans - including the use of children's comics in Croatian and in Italian.

== See also ==
- American propaganda during World War II § Comic books and cartoons
- Walt Disney's World War II propaganda production
- British propaganda during World War II
- Japanese propaganda during World War II
- Nazi propaganda
- Propaganda of Fascist Italy
- List of Allied propaganda films of World War II

== Bibliography ==
- Barry D. Rowland (1990), Herbie and friends: cartoons in wartime, Dundurn, ISBN 978-0-920474-52-5
- Mark Bryant (2009), Illingworth's War in Cartoons: One Hundred of His Greatest Drawings 1939-1945, Grub Street, ISBN 978-1-906502-54-6
- Mark Bryant (2005), World War II in cartoons, Grub Street, ISBN 978-1-904943-06-8
- David Low, Quincy Howe (1946), Years of wrath: a cartoon history: 1931-1945, Simon and Schuster
