= Mitsuru Yoshida =

Japanese author and naval officer (1923–1979)

- 吉田 満
- Yoshida in 1944
- Born: January 6, 1923; Tokyo, Japan
- Died: September 17, 1979 (aged 56)
- Military career
- Allegiance: Empire of Japan
- Branch: Imperial Japanese Army
- Service years: 1944–1945
- Rank: Naval officer
- Unit: Yamato
- Conflicts: World War II; Operation Ten-Go
- Other work: Author

Mitsuru Yoshida (吉田 満, Yoshida Mitsuru; January 6, 1923 – September 17, 1979) was an Imperial Japanese Navy officer and author. Born in Tokyo, Yoshida was a survivor of the battleship Yamato when it was sunk on April 7, 1945, during Operation Ten-Go, an attempt to support the defenders of Okinawa.

His best-known work is Senkan Yamato-no Saigo (Requiem for Battleship Yamato), based on his personal experiences as a junior officer on Yamato's final voyage. It was made into a movie Senkan Yamato ("Battleship Yamato" Shin-Toho. Dir.: Yutaka Abe) in 1953. Another movie, Yamato, was released in 2005.

== Selected bibliography ==
- Requiem for Battleship Yamato (Senkan Yamato-no Saigo translated by Richard H. Minear) ISBN 0-295-96216-X ISBN 1-55750-544-6
