= Requiem for Battleship Yamato =

1952 war memoir by Mitsuru Yoshida

- Title page for Requiem for Battleship Yamato (1985 edition)
- Author: Mitsuru Yoshida
- Original title: 戦艦大和ノ最期
- Translator: Richard H. Minear (1985)
- Language: Japanese
- Published: 1949
- Publication place: Japan

Requiem for Battleship Yamato (戦艦大和ノ最期, lit. The Last Days of the Battleship Yamato (Senkan Yamato no Saigo)) is a book by Mitsuru Yoshida. It tells the story of the Japanese battleship Yamato's last battle, Operation Ten-Go in 1945, when the ship was sunk, which the author experienced himself.

== Publishing history ==
The book was first published in 1949. The book was partially censored by Americans during the occupation of Japan. It was later rewritten several times and published in various forms. The book became influential, and became a basis of 1953 film Battleship Yamato and 1990 TV series Battleship Yamato.

An English version, translated by Richard H. Minear, was published in 1985 under the title Requiem for Battleship Yamato.
