= Japanese cruiser Kumano =

One of the four Mogami class cruisers

Coordinates: 15°44′58″N 119°47′57″E

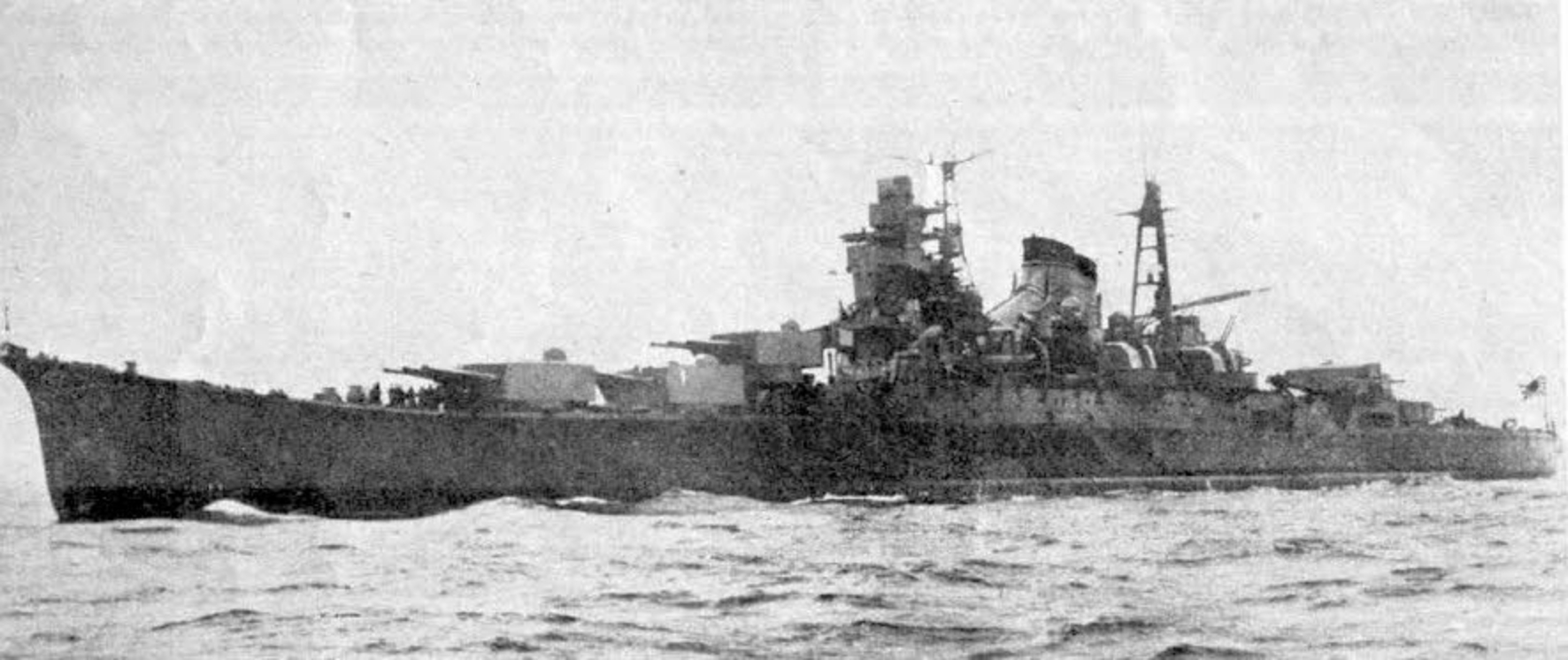
- Kumano in October 1938

History

Empire of Japan
- Name: Kumano
- Namesake: Kumano River in Wakayama Prefecture
- Builder: Kawasaki Shipyards, Kobe, Japan
- Laid down: 4 April 1934
- Launched: 15 October 1936
- Completed: 31 October 1937
- Nickname(s): (9 lives Ship)
- Fate: Sunk by aircraft, 25 November 1944

General characteristics
- Class & type: Mogami-class cruiser
- Displacement: 13,440 long tons (13,660 t) (full load)
- Length: 201.6 m (661 ft 5 in)
- Beam: 22 m (72 ft 2 in)
- Draft: 5.5 m (18 ft 1 in)
- Installed power: 152,000 shp (113,000 kW)
- Propulsion: 4 × impulse single-geared steam turbines; 10 × Kampon boilers; 4 × shafts
- Speed: 35 kn (40 mph; 65 km/h)
- Complement: 850
- Armament: As Built: 15 × 15.5 cm/60 3rd Year Type naval gun (5×3); 8× 12.7 cm/40 Type 89 naval guns (4x2); 4 × 40 mm (1.6 in) anti-aircraft guns; 12 × 610 mm (24 in) Type 93 torpedoes (4 × 3 tube rotating launchers + 12 reloads); Final: 10 × 20 cm/50 3rd Year Type naval guns (5x2); 8 × 12.7 cm/40 Type 89 naval gun (4×2); 50× Type 96 25 mm AT/AA Gun s; 12 × Type 93 torpedoes (4 × 3 tube rotating launchers + 12 reloads)
- Armor: Belt: 10 cm (3.9 in); Deck: 3.5 cm (1.4 in); Turrets: 2.5 cm (1.0 in); Magazines: 12.7 cm (5.0 in)
- Aircraft carried: 3 × Aichi E13A (Type 1) reconnaissance floatplanes
- Aviation facilities: 2 × catapults

Kumano (Japanese: 熊野; named after Kumano River) was one of four Mogami class of heavy cruisers in the Imperial Japanese Navy, serving in World War II. The Mogami-class ships were constructed as "light cruisers" (per the Washington Naval Treaty) with five triple 6.1-inch dual-purpose guns. They were exceptionally large for light cruisers, and the barbettes for the main battery were designed for quick refitting with twin 8-inch guns. In 1937, all four ships were "converted" to heavy cruisers in this fashion. Kumano served in numerous combat engagements in the Pacific War, until she was eventually sunk by carrier aircraft from Task Force 38 while she was undergoing repairs at Santa Cruz, Zambales, Philippines, in November 1944.

== Background and design ==
Built under the Maru-1 Naval Armaments Supplement Programme, the Mogami-class cruisers were designed to the maximum limits allowed by the Washington Naval Treaty, using the latest technology. This resulted in the choice of the dual purpose (DP) 15.5 cm/60 3rd Year Type naval guns as the main battery in five triple turrets capable of 55° elevation. These were the first Japanese cruisers with triple turrets. Secondary armament included eight 12.7 cm/40 Type 89 naval guns in four twin turrets, and 24 Type 93 Long Lance torpedoes in four rotating quadruple mounts.

To save weight, electric welding was used, as was aluminum in the superstructure, and a single funnel stack. New impulse geared turbine engines, driving four shafts with three-bladed propellers gave a top speed of 35 knots (65 km/h; 40 mph), which was better than most contemporary cruiser designs. The Mogami class had twin balanced rudders, rather than the single rudder of previous Japanese cruiser designs.

The class was designed from the start to be upgraded into heavy cruisers with the replacement of their main battery with 20 cm/50 3rd Year Type naval guns in twin turrets.

However, in initial trials in 1935, Mogami and Mikuma were plagued with technical problems due to their untested equipment and welding defects, and also proved to be top-heavy with stability problems in heavy weather. Both vessels, and their yet-to-be-completed sisters, Kumano and Suzuya underwent a complete and very costly rebuilding program. Once rebuilt, the design, with its very high speed, armor protection, and heavy armament was among the best in the world during World War II.

== Service career ==
=== Early career ===
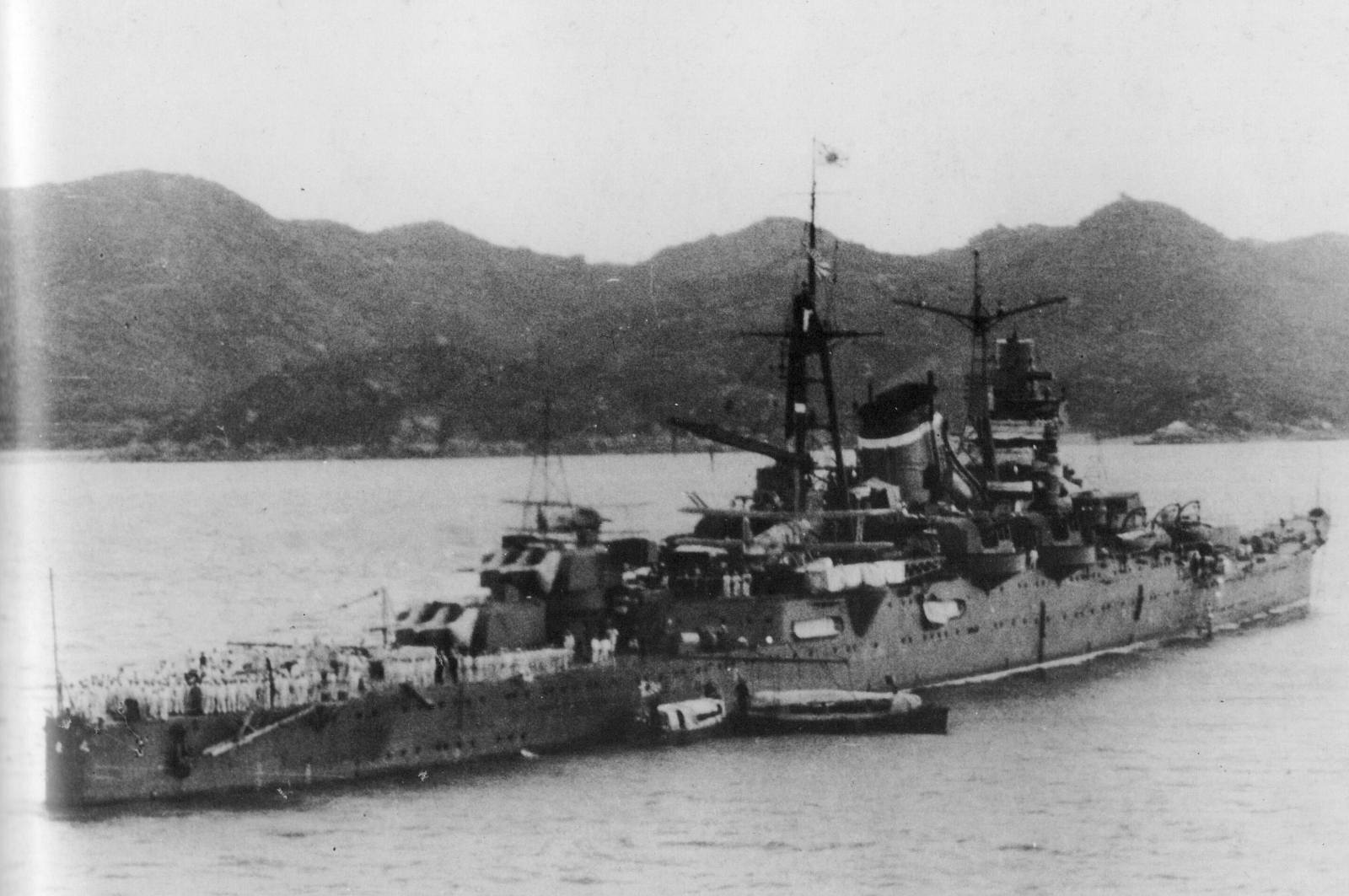
Kumano before the refit

Kumano was laid down at Kawasaki Shipyards in Kobe on 4 April 1934, launched on 15 October 1936 and completed on 31 October 1937. Following the Japanese ship-naming conventions, the ship was named after the Kumano River Kii Peninsula on the island of Honshu in central Japan. Her first captain was Captain Shōji Nishimura, who oversaw her completion and remained captain until May 1939, although she almost immediately underwent modification work at Kure Naval Arsenal which was not completed until October 1939. Her first operational commander was Captain Kaoru Arima, from 15 November 1939 until 15 October 1940. From 16 July 1941, Kumano was part of Sentai-7, together with her sisters Mogami, Mikuma and Suzuya, and was based out of Hainan in support of the Japanese invasion of French Indochina.

=== World War II ===
At the time of the attack on Pearl Harbor, Kumano was the flagship for Vice Admiral Shigeyoshi Inoue’s IJN 4th Fleet and deployed to cover the Japanese invasion of Malaya as part of Vice Admiral Jisaburō Ozawa's First Southern Expeditionary Fleet, providing close support for landings of Japanese troops at Singora, Pattani and Kota Bharu.

On 9 December 1941, the Japanese submarine I-65 reported sighting Royal Navy Force Z (the Royal Navy battleship HMS Prince of Wales, battlecruiser HMS Repulse and supporting destroyers). The light cruiser Sendai relayed the message to Admiral Ozawa aboard Chōkai but reception was poor and the message took 90 minutes to decode. I-65's report was incorrect about Force Z's heading and two Aichi E13A1 "Jake" floatplanes from Suzuya and Kumano attempting to shadow Force Z were forced to ditch due to lack of fuel. Only Suzuya's crew was recovered. The following day, Force Z was overwhelmed by torpedo bombers of the 22nd Air Flotilla from Indochina.

In December 1941, Kumano was tasked with the invasion of Sarawak, together with Suzuya, covering landings of Japanese troops at Miri. She sortied from Cam Ranh Bay with Suzuya to cover landings of troops at Anambas, Endau, Palembang and Banka Island, Sabang on Sumatra and Java in the Netherlands East Indies from the end of December 1941 to the middle of March. Kumano also participated in the seizure of the Andaman Islands in the Indian Ocean on 20 March 1942.

On 6 April 1942 during the Indian Ocean Raid, Kumano and Suzuya together with destroyer Shirakumo sank the British steamships Silksworth (4921 tons), Autolycus (7621 tons), Malda (9066 tons) and Shinkuang (2441 tons) and the American Export Line steamship Exmoor (4986 tons). However, one of the E8N floatplanes from Kumano was damaged by a Curtiss P-36 Hawk from RAF No.5 squadron based at Cuttack, India. Kumano was withdrawn back to Japan, arriving at Kure Naval Arsenal on 27 April. On 26 May, she arrived at Guam to join the escort for the Midway Invasion Transport Group under Sentai -7 (Rear Admiral Raizō Tanaka).

During the Battle of Midway, on 5 June, lookouts aboard Kumano spotted the surfaced USN submarine Tambor, and Kumano signaled a 45-degree simultaneous turn to avoid possible torpedoes. Kumano and Suzuya correctly made the turn, but the third vessel in line, Mikuma, made a 90-degree turn by mistake. and was rammed by Mogami. Kumano returned to Kure on 23 June. On 17 July, Kumano and Suzuya were assigned to provide support for the Japanese invasion of Burma, and evaded six torpedoes fired by the Royal Dutch Navy submarine O 23 west of Perak, Malaya on 29 July. In August, Kumano and Suzuya were reassigned to support the reinforcement of Guadalcanal. During the Battle of the Eastern Solomons on 24 August, Kumano escaped without seeing combat and returned safely to Truk. However, she was attacked on 14 September north of the Solomon Islands by a flight of ten USAAF B-17 Flying Fortresses and suffered light damage. During the Battle of Santa Cruz on 26 October, she supported Admiral Nagumo's Carrier Strike Force, but did not see any combat. She returned to Kure on 7 November and after minor repairs, returned to Rabaul on 4 December with a cargo of troops and supplies. The cruiser conducted patrols and fast transport missions in the area through the middle of February 1943.

Returning to Kure Naval Arsenal on 6 June, Kumano was fitted with a Type 21 radar and her dual 13-mm machine guns were replaced by two triple-mount Type 96 anti-aircraft guns. She returned to Rabaul on 25 June with another cargo of troops and supplies. On 18 July, Kumano was escorting a Tokyo Express high speed transport mission with Chōkai and Sendai, but was attacked off of Kolombangara by USMC Grumman TBF Avenger torpedo bombers from Guadalcanal. The attack damaged Kumano’s aft hull, and she underwent emergency repairs at Rabaul by the repair ship Yamabiko Maru and at Truk by the repair ship Akashi, but finally had to be withdrawn back to Kure from 2 September to 3 November for proper repairs. She was based out of Truk through the end of the year, at Palau in January and February 1944, and in Singapore from March through mid-May. At Singapore, an additional eight single-mount Type 96 guns were added. From late May through June, Kumano was based at Tawi-Tawi. During the Battle of the Philippine Sea, on 20 June 1944 she was attacked by aircraft from the aircraft carriers USS Bunker Hill, Monterey, and Cabot. During this action, the carrier Hiyō was sunk and the battleship Haruna was badly damaged. Kumano returned to Kure on 25 June, and additional Type 13 and Type 22 radars were installed, as were more Type 96 AA guns. She departed on 8 July with reinforcements and supplies for Singapore, arriving 16 July.

On 25 October 1944, as was part of the Japanese Central Force in the Battle off Samar, Kumano was hit by a Mark 15 torpedo fired by USS Johnston, which blew off her bow. As Kumano was retiring toward the San Bernardino Strait, she came under aerial attack and suffered minor damage. The next day Kumano was attacked from aircraft launched by the carrier USS Hancock while in the Sibuyan Sea, and was struck by three 500 lb (227 kg) bombs. She sailed to Manila Bay for repairs on her bow and all four boilers. While still under repairs, she was attacked on 29 October by carrier aircraft from Task Force 38.

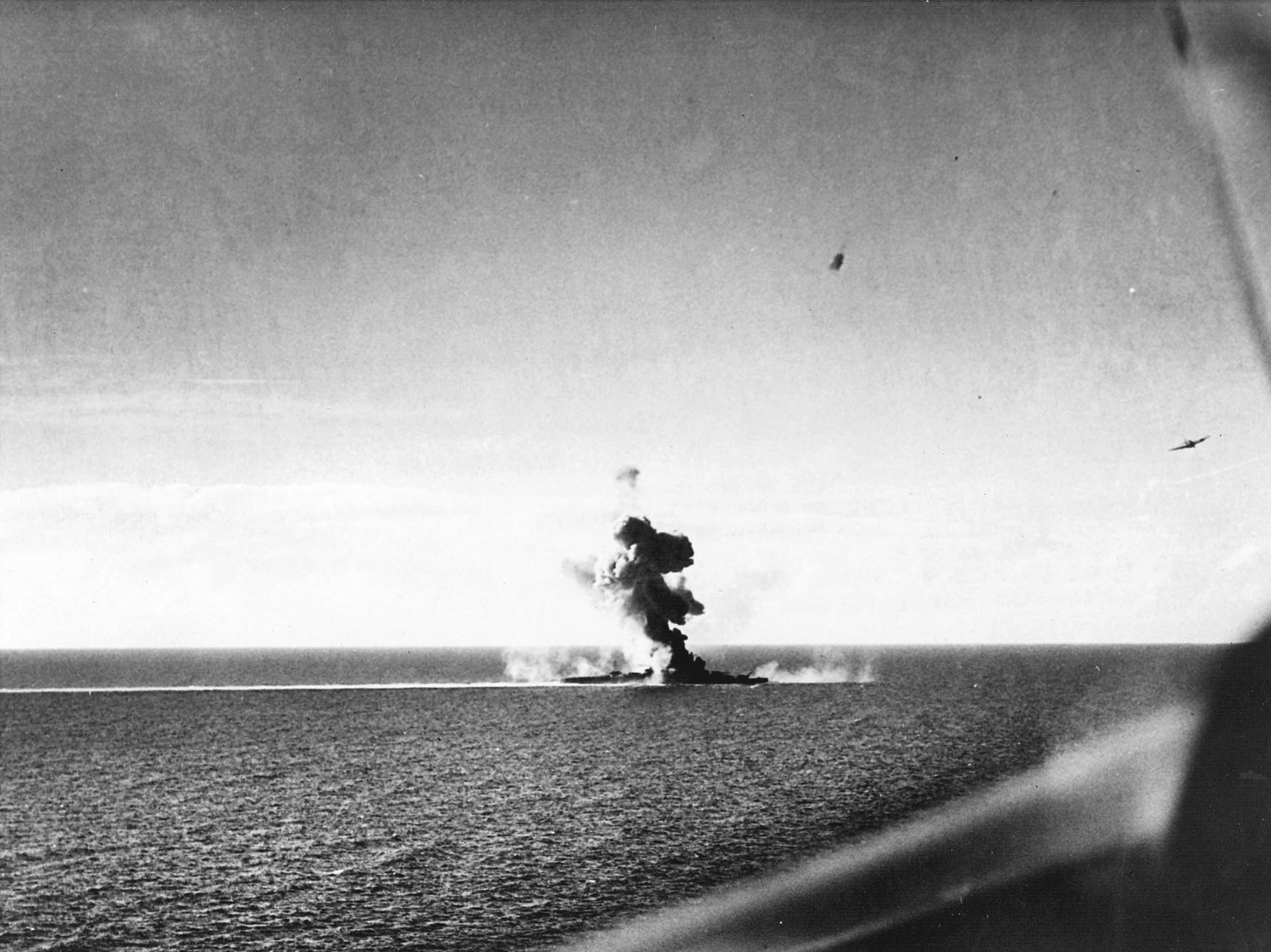
Kumano under attack, 26 October 1944

She returned to service on 4 November, departing Manila for Taiwan as part of the escort for Convoy Ma-Ta 31. On 6 November 1944 off Cape Bolinao, Luzon, the convoy came under attack by a U.S. submarine wolfpack consisting of Batfish, Guitarro, Bream, Raton and Ray. They launched 23 torpedoes toward the convoy, two of which struck Kumano. Ray inflicted the most severe damage on Kumano. The first hit destroyed her recently replaced bow, and the second damaged her starboard engine room, flooding all four engine compartments. She took on an 11° list and lost steerage. At 19:30, she was towed to Dasol Bay by the cargo ship Doryo Maru, then moved to Santa Cruz, Zambales on Luzon.

While undergoing repairs in Santa Cruz on 25 November, Kumano came under attack by aircraft launched by the carrier USS Ticonderoga. She was hit by five torpedoes and four 500 lb (230 kg) bombs, and at 15:15 she rolled over and sank in about 31 m (102 ft) of water. Of her crew at the time, 497 - including Captain Soichiro Hitomi and Executive Officer Captain Yuji Sanada - were lost with the ship and 636 were rescued. She was removed from the navy list on 20 January 1945.

Admiral William "Bull" Halsey reportedly once remarked that "if there was a Japanese ship I could feel sorry for at all, it would be the Kumano".
