= Dr. Seuss Goes to War =

1999 book by Richard H. Minear

Dr. Seuss Goes to War: The World War II Editorial Cartoons of Theodor Seuss Geisel
- Author: Richard H. Minear
- Language: English
- Genre: Non-fiction
- Publisher: The New Press
- Publication date: 1999
- Publication place: United States
- ISBN: 1-56584-565-X

Dr. Seuss Goes to War: The World War II Editorial Cartoons of Theodor Seuss Geisel is a 1999 book written by Richard H. Minear, containing Dr. Seuss's political cartoons created during World War II.

Creating his cartoons for the liberal New York magazine PM, Seuss denounced Adolf Hitler and Benito Mussolini and was highly critical of non-interventionists ("isolationists"), most notably Charles Lindbergh, who opposed US entry into the war. One cartoon depicted all Japanese Americans as latent traitors or fifth-columnists while at the same time other cartoons deplored the racism at home against Jews and blacks that harmed the war effort. His cartoons were strongly supportive of President Franklin D. Roosevelt's handling of the war, combining the usual exhortations to ration and contribute to the war effort with frequent attacks on Congress (especially the Republican Party), parts of the press (such as the New York Daily News, Chicago Tribune and Washington Times-Herald), isolationists (notably Charles Lindbergh), and others for criticism of Roosevelt, criticism of aid to the Soviet Union, investigation of suspected communists, and other offenses that he depicted as leading to disunity and helping the Nazis, intentionally or inadvertently.

== Reception ==
The book was well received. Entertainment Weekly gave it an "A" grade: "This is scathing, fascinating stuff, and with Minear's commentary, it provides a provocative history of wartime politics." People described the book as "How the Führer (Almost) Stole Christmas" and called it "a revelation", although (like many other reviewers) it noted with distaste Seuss's "incongruously, appallingly caricatured Japanese-Americans". Gaby Wood of The Guardian commented on the connection between Seuss's war cartoons and the messages in his later work for children, observing, "It is as if, having fought for common sense during the war, Dr Seuss performed a canny shift and turned non-sense to his advantage, making it the plain universal language we needed to hear."

== Exhibitions and sequel ==
The book led to a number of museum exhibitions about Seuss's political work. In 2009, a follow-up volume was published entitled Dr. Seuss & Co. Go to War, presenting Seuss's cartoons for PM together with those by other PM artists, including Saul Steinberg.
