= Mogami-class cruiser =

Class of Japanese heavy cruisers

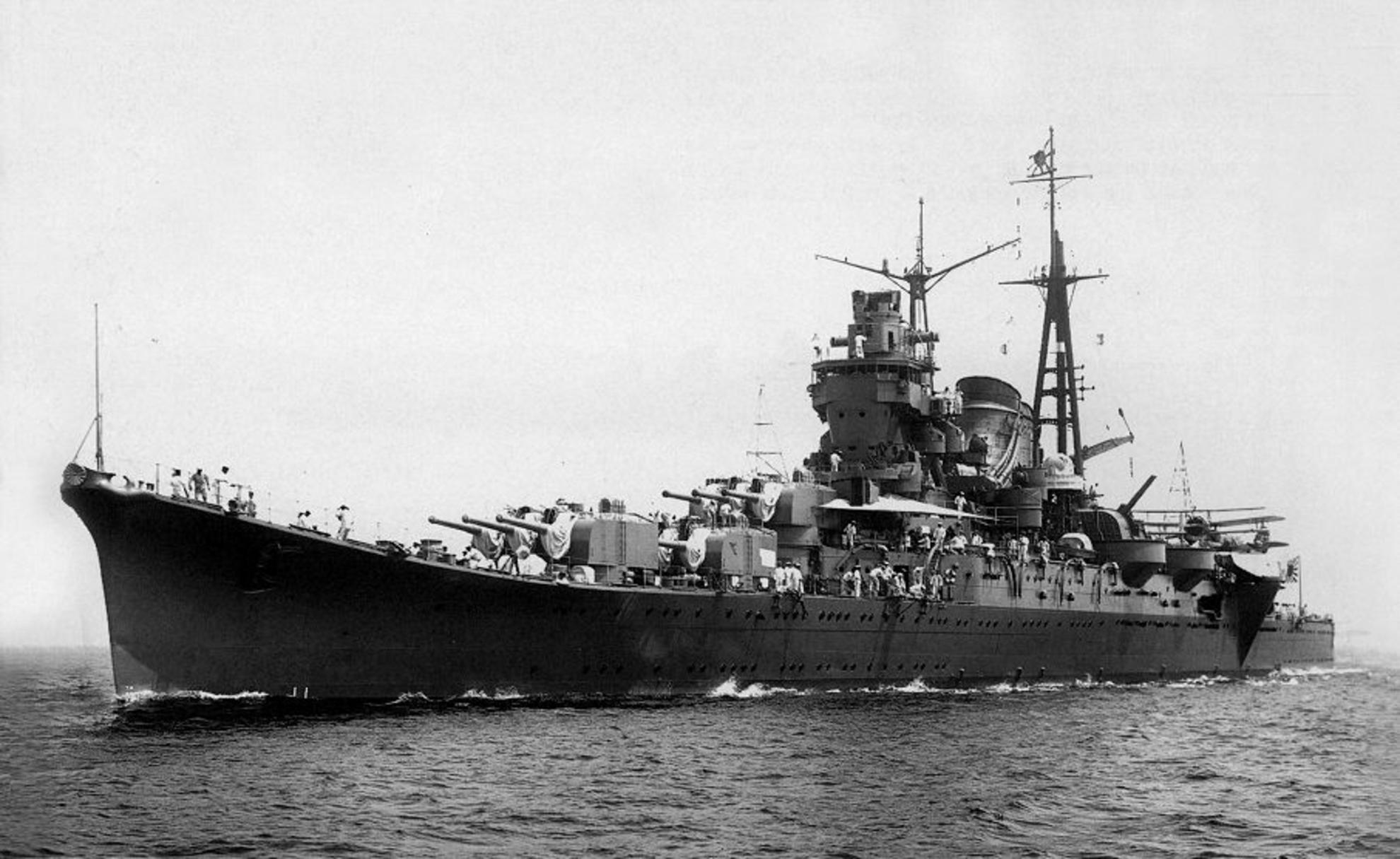
- Mogami

Class overview
- Name: Mogami class
- Builders: Kure Naval Arsenal; Mitsubishi Heavy Industries, Nagasaki; Yokosuka Naval Arsenal; Kawasaki Dockyard, Kobe
- Operators: Imperial Japanese Navy
- Preceded by: Takao class
- Succeeded by: Tone class
- Built: 1931–1937
- In commission: 1935–1944
- Completed: 4
- Lost: 4

General characteristics
- Type: Heavy cruiser
- Displacement: 8,500 tons (standard load, as reported) 10,980 tons (full load), approx. 11,000 tons (standard, actual displacement)
- Length: 201.6 m (661 ft 5 in)
- Beam: 20.6 m (67 ft 7 in) (Mogami class); 20.2 m (66 ft 3 in) (Suzuya class)
- Draft: 5.5 m (18 ft 1 in)
- Installed power: 8–10 Kampon boilers; 152,000 shp (113,000 kW)
- Propulsion: 4 shafts; 4 geared steam turbines
- Speed: 37 knots (69 km/h; 43 mph)
- Range: 8,000 nmi (15,000 km; 9,200 mi) at 14 knots (26 km/h; 16 mph)
- Complement: 850
- Armament: (initial); 5 × triple 15.5 cm/60 3rd Year Type guns (replaced by 5 × twin 20.3 cm/50 3rd Year Type 2 guns from 1939); 4 × twin 127 mm (5 in) guns; 4 × single 40 mm (1.6 in) AA guns; 4 × triple 610 mm (24 in) torpedo tubes
- Armor: Belt: 100 mm (3.9 in); Belt over magazine: 140 mm (5.5 in); Deck: 35 mm (1.4 in); Turrets: 25 mm (0.98 in); Magazines: 127 mm (5.0 in)
- Aircraft carried: 3 × Aichi E13A floatplanes

The Mogami class (最上型) was a ship class of four cruisers built for the Imperial Japanese Navy (IJN) during the 1930s. They were initially classified as light cruisers under the weight and armament restrictions of the London Naval Treaty. After Japan abrogated that agreement, all four ships were rearmed with larger guns and reclassified as heavy cruisers. All participated in World War II and were sunk.

== Design ==
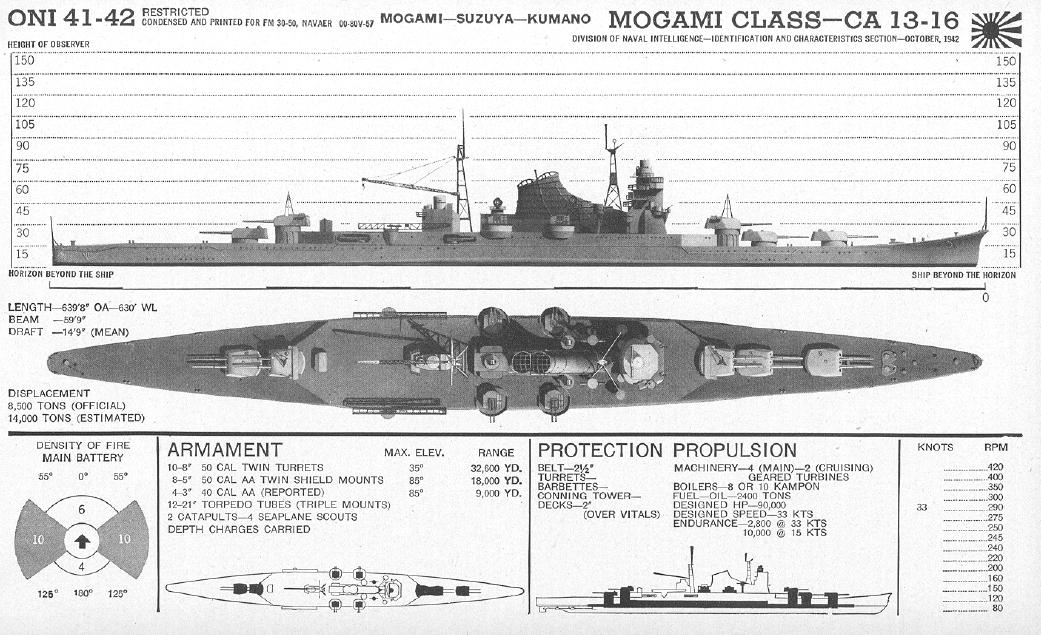
Recognition drawing of the Mogami class, showing armament and armor arrangement

For the 1931 Fleet Replenishment Program, believing themselves understrength in cruisers, the IJN chose to build to the maximum allowed by the Washington Naval Treaty. This resulted in the choice of 155 mm (6.1 in) guns in five triple turrets (a first for Japan) in the Mogamis, also capable of 55° elevation, making the Mogamis one of the very few classes of cruiser to have a dual purpose (DP) main battery; this was coupled with very heavy anti-aircraft protection, as well as the standard reloadable, turreted torpedo launchers, also unique to the IJN.

To save weight and improve transverse stability, the class was given a more compact and lower superstructure, made of aluminium, which was welded rather than riveted. Only ten boilers could be fit under the weight limits (compared to twelve in the previous Takao and Myōkō classes), and the chimney arrangement was designed to minimize weight as well; the middle funnel featured no chimney of its own, instead venting its exhaust gasses into the underside of the forward chimney, which itself was reclined from its base so that, at its top, it merged with the aft funnel's chimney. The new geared impulse turbines added 22,000 shaft horsepower (16,000 kW) over Atago, increasing the top speed by 1.5 knots (2.8 km/h; 1.7 mph). Protection, however, was not stinted on; the class proved able to take substantial punishment.

The declared weight was 8,500 tons, though the true design weight was 9,500 and at trials they would displace 11,169 tons. “They must be building their ships out of cardboard or lying” said the Royal Navy’s Director of Naval Construction (DNC) in 1935 when briefed by Naval Intelligence about the public displacement figure announced by the Japanese.

The designers, however, had overreached; excessive topweight led to instability, and gunnery trials revealed cracking hull welds. Hull bulges were retrofitted to Mogami and Mikuma, and added to Kumano and Suzuya, increasing beam to 20.5 m (67 ft) and displacement to 11,200 tons, cutting speed by 2 knots (3.7 km/h; 2.3 mph).

Following Japan's withdrawal from the Second London Naval Treaty, plans were made to modernize and expand the entire fleet. Beginning in 1939, the class was brought in for substantial reconstruction, replacing the triple 155 mm turrets with twin 203 mm (8-inch) guns, turning over the 155 mm turrets for the battleships of the Yamato class. Indeed, the designers had designed the class in mind so that the 6-inch guns could be switched with 8-inch batteries, in effect making them heavy cruisers and skirting the London Naval Treaty, though the Japanese had withdrawn from the conference and were not signatories to the Second London Naval Treaty of 1936.

Torpedo bulges were also added; in all, displacement rose to over 13,000 tons, and speed dropped to 35 knots (65 km/h; 40 mph).

== War service ==
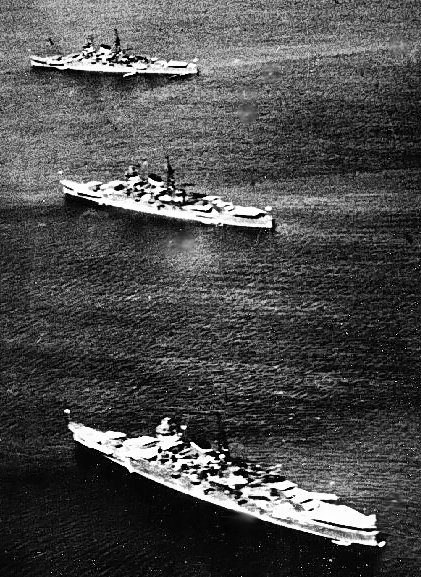
Kumano (foreground), Mikuma (center) and Suzuya in Ise Bay, 1938.

All four ships participated in the Japanese invasion of the Dutch East Indies. Mogami and Mikuma were present at the Battle of Sunda Strait and contributed to the sinkings of the cruisers HMAS Perth and USS Houston.

In June 1942, all four took part in the Battle of Midway, where Mogami and Mikuma collided trying to avoid a submarine attack; Mikuma was finished off on 6 June 1942 by aircraft from aircraft carriers USS Enterprise and Hornet. The heavily damaged Mogami limped home and spent ten months in yard, during which her afterparts were completely rebuilt, and "X" and "Y" turrets were replaced by a flight deck (with the intention to operate 11 aircraft).

In October 1944, the survivors were reunited at the Battle of Leyte Gulf. Mogami, heavily damaged by a collision with the cruiser Nachi, cruiser gunfire, and aerial attack, was scuttled by the destroyer Akebono, while Kumano limped into Manila harbor on one boiler, to be sunk by Halsey's aviators on 25 November 1944; the US escort carrier planes mauled Suzuya at Leyte, which was scuttled by the destroyer Okinami on 25 October.

== Ships ==
Construction data
Name	Kanji	Subclass	Builder	Laid down	Launched	Completed	Fate
Mogami	最上	Mogami	Kure Naval Arsenal	27 Oct 1931	14 Mar 1934	28 Jul 1935	Scuttled after massive battle damage during the Battle of Surigao Strait, 25 Oct 1944
Mikuma	三隈	Mogami	Mitsubishi Heavy Industries, Nagasaki Yard	24 Dec 1931	31 May 1934	29 Aug 1935	Sunk during the Battle of Midway, 6 Jun 1942
Suzuya	鈴谷	Suzuya	Yokosuka Naval Arsenal	11 Dec 1933	20 Nov 1934	31 Oct 1937	Sunk during the Battle off Samar, 25 Oct 1944
Kumano	熊野	Suzuya	Kawasaki Dockyard Company, Kobe Yard	5 Apr 1934	15 Oct 1936	31 Oct 1937	Sunk by American aircraft during the Philippine campaign, 25 Nov 1944

== Bibliography ==
- Blair, Clay (1975). Silent Victory. London: Lippincott.
- Dull, Paul S. (1978). A Battle History of the Imperial Japanese Navy, 1941-1945. Annapolis, Maryland: Naval Institute Press. ISBN 0-87021-097-1.
- Jentschura, Hansgeorg; Jung, Dieter & Mickel, Peter (1977). Warships of the Imperial Japanese Navy, 1869–1945. Annapolis, Maryland: United States Naval Institute. ISBN 0-87021-893-X.
- Lacroix, Eric; Wells II, Linton (1997). Japanese Cruisers of the Pacific War. Annapolis: Naval Institute Press. ISBN 0-87021-311-3. OCLC 21079856.
- Preston, Antony (2004). World's Worst Warships. London: Conway's Maritime Press.
- Rohwer, Jürgen (2005). Chronology of the War at Sea 1939–1945: The Naval History of World War Two (Third Revised ed.). Annapolis, Maryland: Naval Institute Press. ISBN 1-59114-119-2.
- Sturton, Ian (1980). "Japan". In Chesneau, Roger (ed.). Conway's All the World's Fighting Ships 1922–1946. Greenwich, UK: Conway Maritime Press. ISBN 0-85177-146-7.
- Whitley, M. J. (1995). Cruisers of World War Two: An International Encyclopedia. London: Cassell. ISBN 1-86019-874-0.
