= 15.5 cm/60 3rd Year Type naval gun =

15.5 cm/60 3rd Year Type
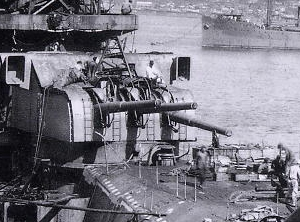
- Aft 155-mm triple turret on Yamato under construction, September 1941
- Type: Naval gun
- Place of origin: Japan

Service history
- In service: 1935–1945
- Used by: Imperial Japanese Navy
- Wars: World War II

Production history
- Designed: 1933
- Manufacturer: Kure Naval Arsenal
- No. built: 80

Specifications
- Mass: 12.7 metric tons (28,000 lb)
- Length: 9.615 metres (31.55 ft)
- Barrel length: 9.3 metres (31 ft)
- Shell: 55.87 kilograms (123.2 lb)
- Caliber: 155 millimetres (6.1 in) 60 caliber
- Elevation: -7° to +45°
- Rate of fire: 5 rpm
- Muzzle velocity: 925 metres per second (3,030 ft/s)
- Maximum firing range: 27,400 metres (30,000 yd) at 45°

The 15.5 cm/60 3rd Year Type (60口径三年式15.5cm3連装砲, 60 kōkei sannenshiki 15.5 centi sanrensōhō) was a dual-purpose naval gun used by the Imperial Japanese Navy on the Yamato-class battleships as secondary armament in four triple turrets, the Mogami-class cruisers in five triple turrets (later converted to five twin 20 cm/50 3rd Year Type naval gun turrets) and on the light cruiser Ōyodo in two triple turrets. The Tone-class cruisers were also initially planned to carry the 15.5 cm/60 3rd Year Type in five triple turrets, but were redesigned with the 20 cm/50 3rd Year Type in four twin turrets. They were also deployed on 60° single mounts as coastal defense guns in the Tokyo Bay area. Construction was of the monobloc type with autofretting and used a Welin breech block mechanism which could be operated either hydraulically or by hand. Their slow rate of fire, limited elevation and slow traverse made them unsuitable for the AA role, but they were an anti-ship weapon.

== See also ==
- Canon de 155 mm Modèle 1920 French counterpart by caliber
