= Richard Minear =

Historian (born 1938)

Richard H. Minear (/mɪˈnɪər/; born 1938) is a professor emeritus of history at the University of Massachusetts Amherst. He taught a survey course of Japanese history and a Hiroshima seminar. Minear got his PhD from Harvard University in 1968. He is best known for his book about the Tokyo War Crimes Trials, Victors' Justice. He has lived in Japan for many years and translated Japanese works into English (including Requiem for Battleship Yamato, Hiroshima: Three Witnesses, Black Eggs and Japan's Past, Japan's Future: One Historian's Odyssey).

In 1999, following a tip off from a student, Minear discovered a cache of wartime cartoons by Dr. Seuss, which he then published.

== Writings ==
He is the author of the following books (partial list of those most widely held):

- Minear, Richard H. Victors' Justice; The Tokyo War Crimes Trial. Princeton, N.J.: Princeton University Press, 1971, and 7 subsequent editions.
  - Translated into Japanese as: Minear, Richard H., and Nisuke Andō. Tōkyō Saiban: shōsha no sabaki. 東京裁判 : 勝者の裁き Tōkyō: Fukumura Shuppan, 1985.
- Minear, Richard H., Theodor Seuss Geisel, and Art Spiegelman. Dr. Seuss Goes to War: The World War II Editorial Cartoons of Theodor Seuss Geisel. New York: New Press, 1999, ISBN 1-56584-704-0 and 5 subsequent editions. (held in over 1100 libraries, according to WorldCat)
- Minear, Richard H. Japanese Tradition and Western Law: Emperor, State, and Law in the Thought of Hozumi Yatsuka. Harvard East Asian series, 48. Cambridge, Massachusetts: Harvard University Press, 1970.
  - Translated into Japanese as Minear, Richard H. Seiyō Hōshisō No Keiju. 西洋法思想の継受 : 穗積八束の思想史的考察 Tokyo: Translation rights arranged through Charles E. Tuttle Co, 1971.
- Gage, Richard L., and Richard H. Minear. Women against War. Tokyo: Kodansha International, 1986.
- War and Conscience in Japan: Nambara Shigeru and the Asia-Pacific War. Rowman & Littlefield Pub Inc, 2010 / 東京大学出版会, 2011. 南原繁 歌集『形相』から百首を日英両語で刊

and the children's book

- Minear, Richard H. Through Japanese Eyes. New York: Praeger, 1974. OCLC 804861
