= Yamato-class battleship =

Class of Japanese battleships

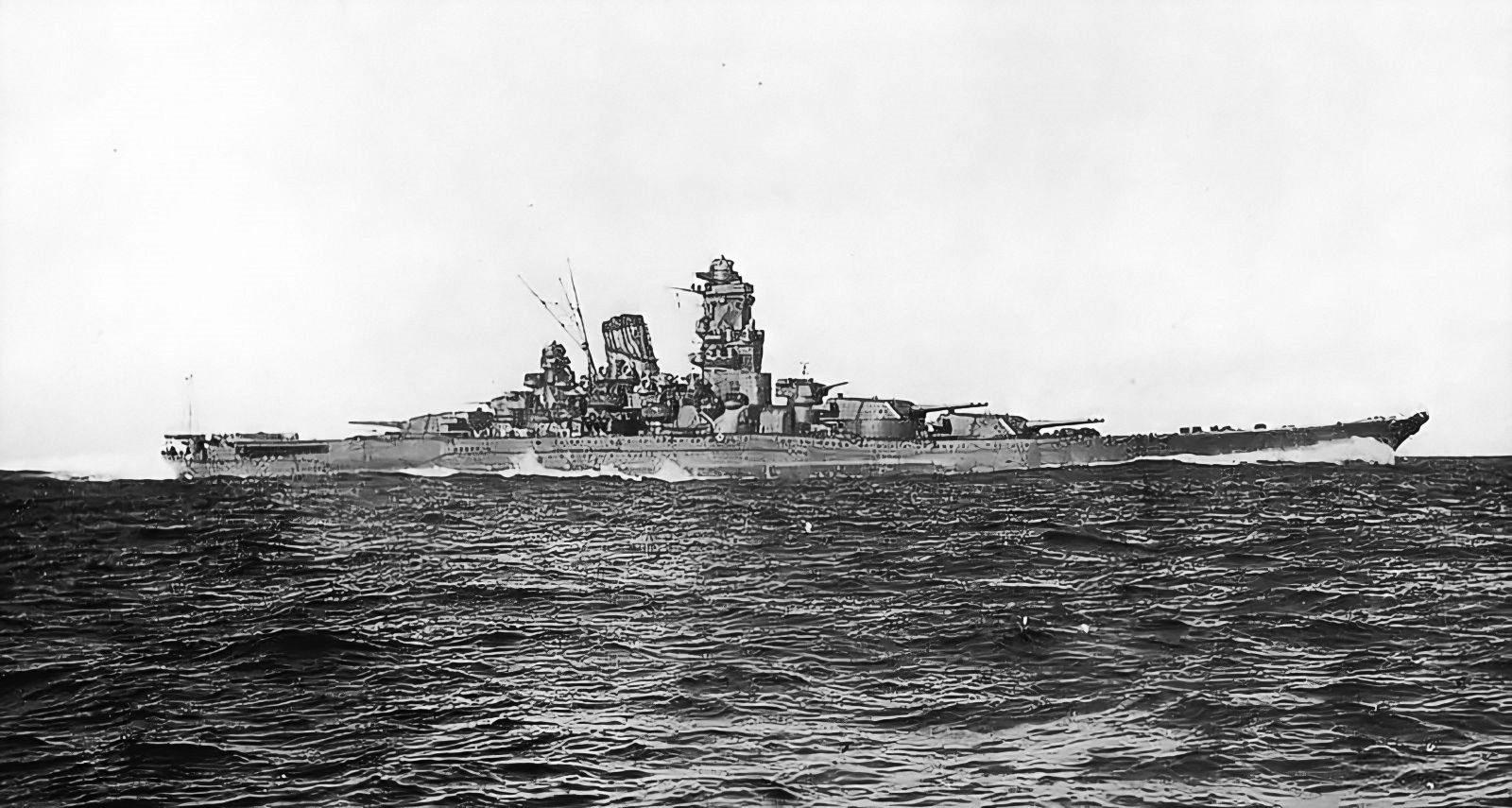
- Yamato undergoing trials in 1941

Class overview
- Name: Yamato class
- Builders: Kure Naval Arsenal; Yokosuka Naval Arsenal; Mitsubishi Shipyard, Nagasaki
- Operators: Imperial Japanese Navy
- Preceded by: Nagato class (actual); Number 13 class (planned)
- Succeeded by: A-150 class (planned)
- Subclasses: 2 (Shinano and No. 797 classes)
- Cost: ¥250,000,897 (equivalent to about ¥144,000,000,000 in 2024)
- Built: 1937–1942
- In commission: 1941–1945
- Planned: 5
- Completed: 3 (2 battleships, 1 converted to aircraft carrier)
- Canceled: 2 (one subclass)
- Lost: 3

General characteristics (as built)
- Type: Battleship
- Displacement: 69,988 long tons (71,111 t) (trials); 71,659 long tons (72,809 t) (full load).
- Length: 256 m (839 ft 11 in) (waterline); 263 m (862 ft 10 in) (o/a)
- Beam: 38.9 m (127 ft 7 in)
- Draught: 10.4 m (34 ft 1 in)
- Installed power: 12 water-tube boilers; 150,000 shp (110 MW)
- Propulsion: 4 shafts; 4 steam turbines
- Speed: 27 knots (50 km/h; 31 mph)
- Range: 7,200 nmi (13,300 km; 8,300 mi) at 16 knots (30 km/h; 18 mph)
- Complement: 2,767
- Armament: 3 × triple 46 cm (18.1 in) guns; 4 × triple 15.5 cm (6.1 in) guns; 6 × twin 12.7 cm (5 in) guns; 8 × triple 25 mm (0.98 in) AA guns; 2 × twin 13.2 mm (0.52 in) machine guns
- Armor: 650 mm (26 in) on face of main turrets; 410 mm (16 in) side armor (400 mm (16 in) planned on Shinano and No. 111), inclined 20 degrees; 200 mm (8 in) armored deck (75%); 230 mm (9 in) armored deck (25%)
- Aircraft carried: 4 Aichi E13A, 3 Mitsubishi F1M; 2 catapults (Yamato, Musashi); 47 aircraft (Shinano)

The Yamato-class battleships (Japanese: 大和型戦艦, romanized: Yamato-gata senkan) were two battleships of the Imperial Japanese Navy, Yamato and Musashi. Their keels were laid down in 1937 and 1938, and they were commissioned as designed in 1941 and 1942. A third hull, laid down in 1940, was converted to the aircraft carrier Shinano during construction. Two further ships were planned but never constructed.

Displacing nearly 72,000 long tons (73,000 t) at full load, the completed battleships were the heaviest ever constructed. The class carried the largest naval artillery ever fitted to a warship, nine 460 mm (18.1 in) naval guns, each capable of firing 1,460 kg (3,220 lb) shells over 42 km (26 mi).

Because of the threat of U.S. submarines and aircraft carriers, Yamato and Musashi spent the majority of their careers in naval bases at Brunei, Truk, and Kure, deploying on several occasions in response to U.S. raids on Japanese bases.

All three ships were sunk by the U.S. Navy, Musashi by air strikes while participating in the Battle of Leyte Gulf in October 1944, Shinano after being torpedoed by the submarine USS Archerfish while under way from Yokosuka to Kure for fitting out in November 1944, and Yamato by air strikes while en route from Japan to Okinawa as part of Operation Ten-Go in April 1945.

== Background ==
The design of the Yamato-class battleships was shaped by expansionist movements within the Japanese government, Japanese industrial power, and the need for a fleet powerful enough to intimidate likely adversaries. Most importantly, the latter, in the form of the Kantai Kessen or Decisive Battle Doctrine, a naval strategy adopted by the Imperial Japanese Navy (IJN) prior to the Second World War, in which the Japanese navy would win a war by fighting and winning a single, decisive naval action.

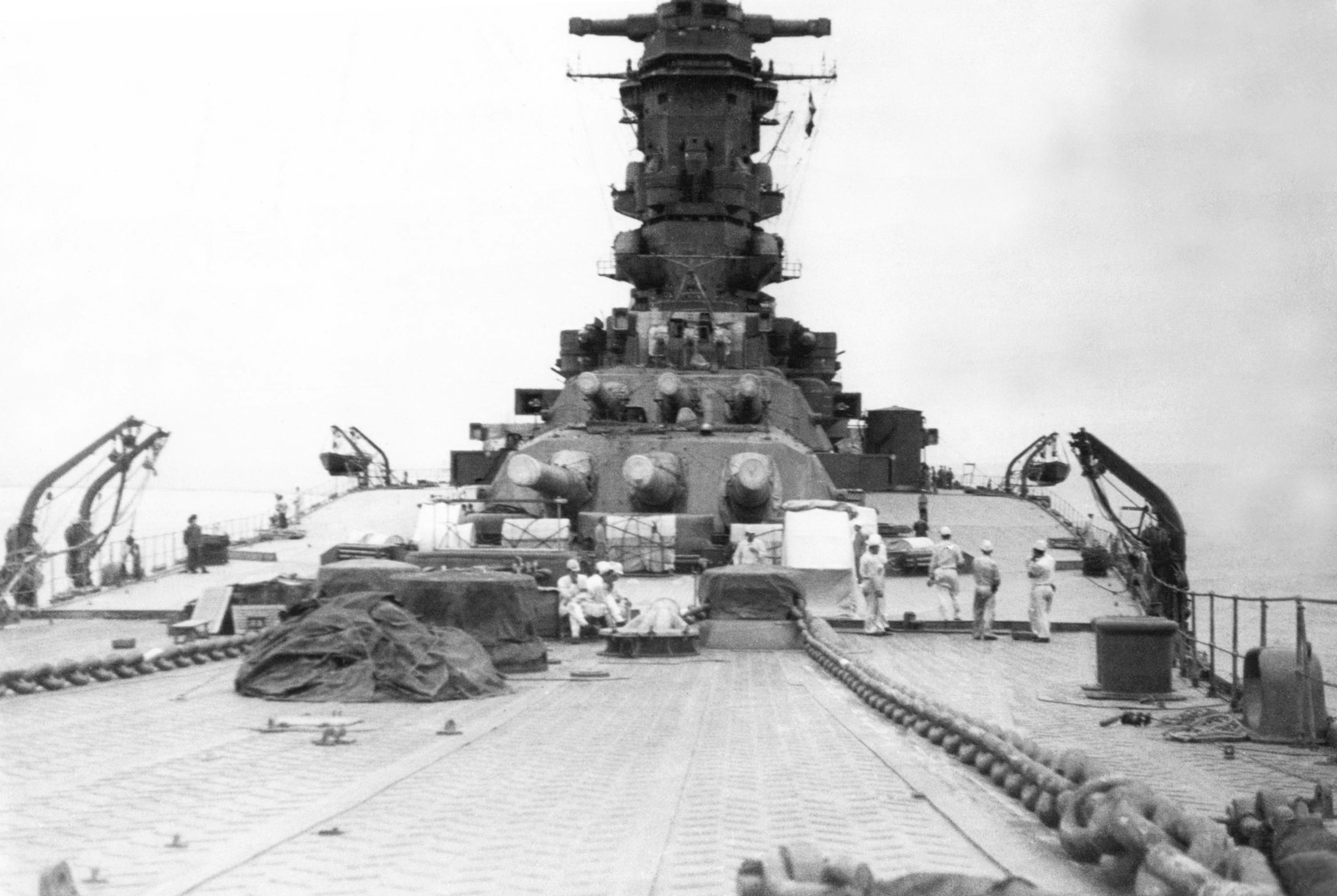
Musashi, August 1942, taken from the bow

After the end of the First World War, many navies—including those of the United States, the United Kingdom, and Imperial Japan—continued and expanded construction programs that had begun during the conflict. The enormous costs associated with these programs pressured their government leaders to begin a disarmament conference. On 8 July 1921, the United States' Secretary of State Charles Evans Hughes invited delegations from the other major maritime powers—France, Italy, Japan, and the United Kingdom—to come to Washington, DC, and discuss a possible end to the naval arms race. The subsequent Washington Naval Conference resulted in the Washington Naval Treaty. Along with many other provisions, it limited all future battleships to a standard displacement of 35,000 long tons (35,562 t; 39,200 short tons) and a maximum gun caliber of 16 inches (406 mm). It also agreed that the five countries would not construct more capital ships for 10 years and would not replace any ship that survived the treaty until it was at least 20 years old.

In the 1930s, the Japanese government began a shift towards ultranationalist militancy. This movement called for the expansion of the Empire of Japan to include much of the Pacific Ocean and Southeast Asia. The maintenance of such an empire—spanning 3,000 miles (4,800 km) from China to Midway Island—required a sizable fleet capable of sustained control of territory. Although all of Japan's battleships built prior to the Yamato class had been completed before 1921—as the Washington Treaty had prevented any more from being completed—all had been either reconstructed or significantly modernized, or both, in the 1930s. This modernization included, among other things, additional speed and firepower, which the Japanese intended to use to conquer and defend their aspired-to empire. When Japan withdrew from the League of Nations in 1934 over the Mukden Incident, it also renounced all treaty obligations, freeing it to build warships larger than those of the other major maritime powers.

Japan's intention to acquire resource-producing colonies in the Pacific and Southeast Asia would likely lead to confrontation with the United States; thus the U.S. became Japan's primary potential enemy. The U.S. possessed significantly greater industrial power than Japan, with 32.2% of worldwide industrial production compared to Japan's 3.5%. Furthermore, several leading members of the United States Congress had pledged "to outbuild Japan three to one in a naval race". Consequently, as Japanese industrial output could not compete with American industrial power, Japanese ship designers developed plans for new battleships individually superior to their counterparts in the United States Navy. Each of these battleships would be capable of engaging multiple enemy capital ships simultaneously, eliminating the need to expend as much industrial effort as the U.S. on battleship construction.

== Design ==
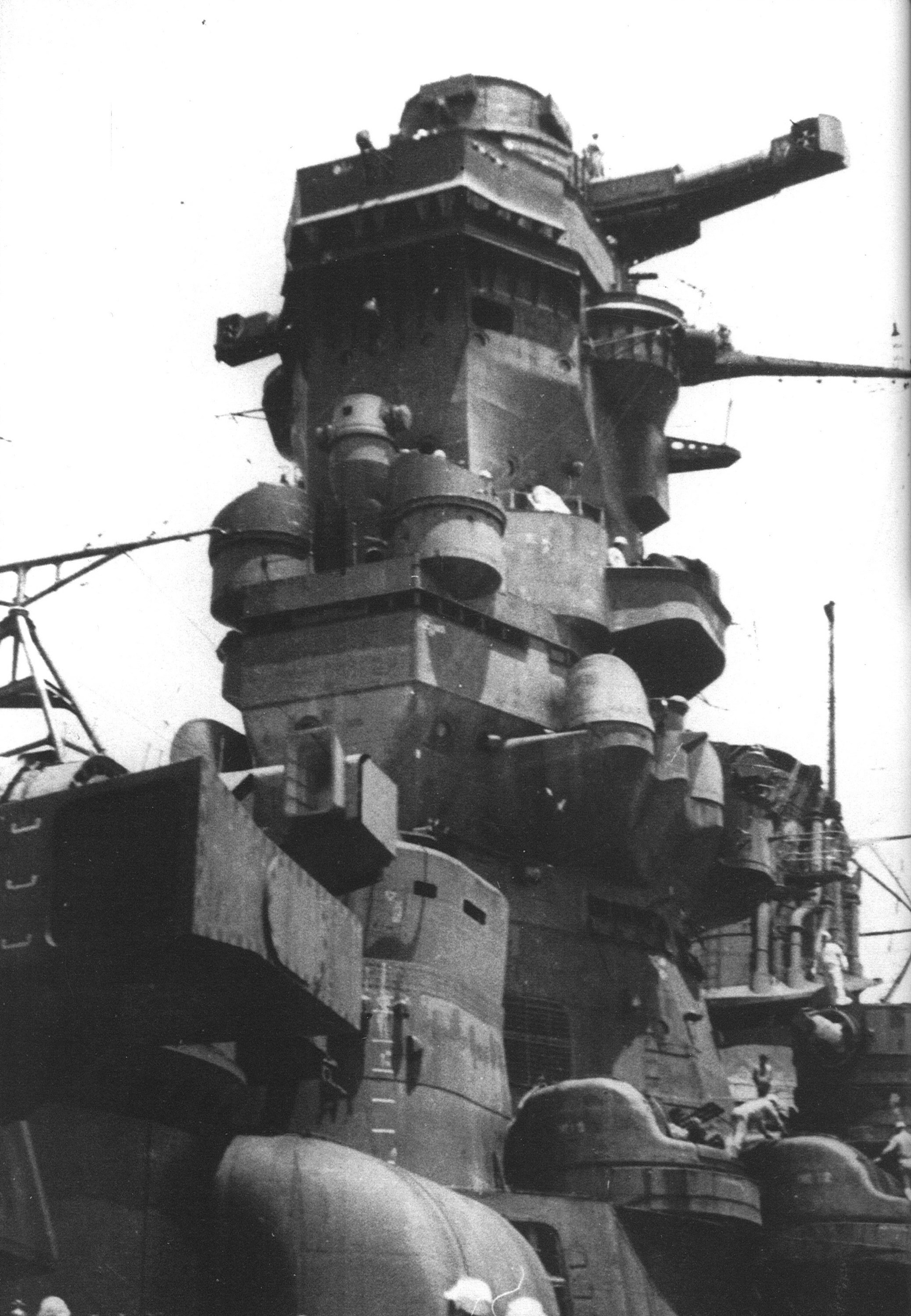
The bridge of Musashi

Preliminary studies for a new class of battleships began after Japan's departure from the League of Nations and its renunciation of the Washington and London naval treaties; from 1934 to 1936, 24 initial designs were put forth. These early plans varied greatly in armament, propulsion, endurance, and armor. Main batteries fluctuated between 460 and 406 mm (18 and 16 in) guns, while the secondary armaments were composed of differing numbers of 155 mm (6.1 in), 127 mm (5 in), and 25 mm (1 in) guns. Propulsion in most of the designs was a hybrid diesel-turbine combination, though one relied solely on diesel and another planned for only turbines. The maximum range of the various designs was between 6,000 nautical miles (11,000 km; 6,900 mi) in design A-140-J_{2} and a high of 9,200 nmi (17,000 km; 10,600 mi) in designs A-140A and A-140-B_{2}, at a speed of 18 knots (33 km/h; 21 mph). Armor varied between providing protection from the fire of 406 mm guns to enough protection against 460 mm guns.

After these had been reviewed, two of the original 24 were finalized as possibilities, A-140-F_{3} and A-140-F_{4}. Differing primarily in their range (4,900 nmi (9,100 km; 5,600 mi) versus 7,200 nmi (13,300 km; 8,300 mi) at 16 knots (30 km/h; 18 mph)), they were used in the formation of the final preliminary study, which was finished on 20 July 1936. Tweaks to that design resulted in the definitive design of March 1937, which was put forth by Rear Admiral Keiji Fukuda; a range of 7,200 nmi was finally decided upon, and the hybrid diesel-turbine propulsion was abandoned in favor of turbines. The diesel engines were removed from the design because of problems with the engines aboard the submarine tender Taigei. Their engines, which were similar to the ones that were going to be mounted in the new battleships, required a "major repair and maintenance effort" to keep them running due to a "fundamental design defect". In addition, if the engines failed entirely, the 200 mm (7.9 in) armored citadel deck roof that protected the proposed diesel engine rooms and attendant machinery spaces would severely hamper any attempt to remove and replace them.

The final design called for a standard displacement of 64,000 long tons (65,000 t) and a full-load displacement of 69,988 long tons (71,111 t), making the ships of the class the largest battleships yet designed, and the largest battleships ever constructed. The design called for a main armament of nine 460 mm naval guns, mounted in three triple-gun turrets—each of which weighed more than a 1930s-era destroyer. The designs were quickly approved by the IJN high command, over the objections of naval aviators, who argued for the construction of aircraft carriers rather than battleships. (Note: Even as far back as 1933, IJN aviators, including Admiral Isoroku Yamamoto, argued that the best defense against U.S. carrier attacks would be a carrier fleet of their own, not a battleship fleet. However, "when controversy broke into the open, the older, conservative admirals held firm to their traditional faith in the battleship as the capital ship of the fleet by supporting the construction of the ...Yamato-class superbattleships." See: Reynolds, pp. 5–6) In all, five Yamato-class battleships were planned.

== Ships ==
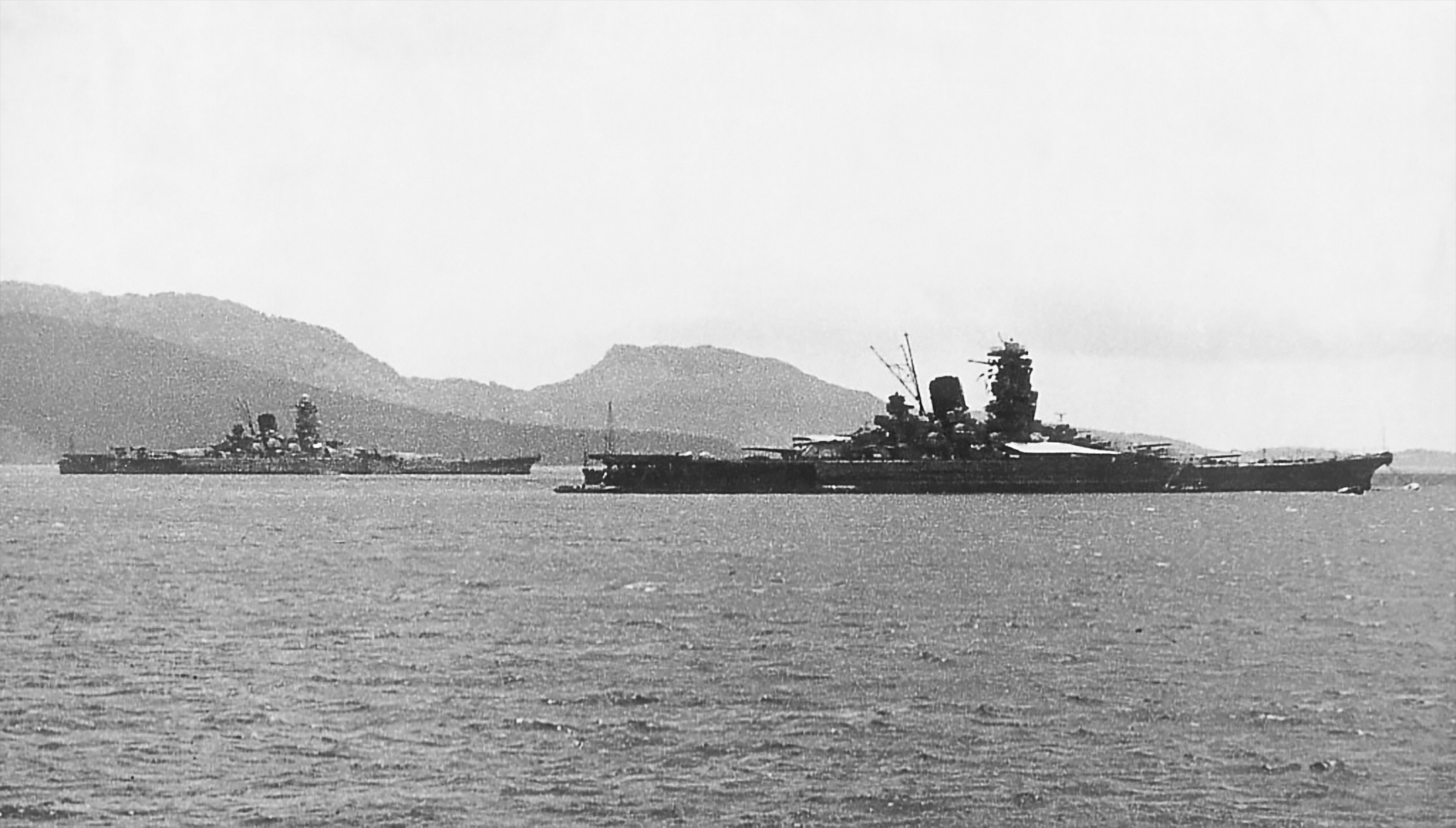
Yamato and Musashi anchored in the waters off of the Truk Islands in 1943

Although five Yamato-class vessels had been planned in 1937, only three—two battleships and a converted aircraft carrier—were completed. All three vessels were built in extreme secrecy, to prevent American intelligence officials from learning of their existence and specifications; indeed, the United States' Office of Naval Intelligence only became aware of Yamato and Musashi by name in late 1942. At this early time, their assumptions on the class's specifications were quite far off; while they were correct on their length, the class was given as having a beam of 110 ft (34 m)—in actuality, it was about 127 ft (39 m) and a displacement of 40,000–57,000 tons (actually, 69,000 tons). In addition, the main armament of Yamato class was given as nine 16 in (410 mm) guns as late as July 1945, four months after Yamato was sunk.

Both Jane's Fighting Ships and the Western media also misreported the specifications of the ships. In September 1944, Jane's Fighting Ships listed the displacement of both Yamato and Musashi as 45,000 tons. Similarly, both The New York Times and the Associated Press reported that the two ships displaced 45,000 tons with a speed of 30 knots, and even after the sinking of Yamato in April 1945, The Times of London continued to give 45,000 tons as the ship's displacement. Nevertheless, the existence of the ships—and their supposed violation of naval treaties—heavily influenced American naval engineers in the design of the 60,500-ton Montana-class battleships, though they were not designed specifically to counter the Yamato class.

Construction data
Name	Namesake	Builder	Laid down	Launched	Commissioned	Fate
Yamato	Yamato Province (Great Harmony)	Kure Naval Arsenal	4 November 1937	8 August 1940	16 December 1941	Sunk by aircraft during Operation Ten-Go, 7 April 1945
Musashi	Musashi Province / Miyamoto Musashi	Mitsubishi Heavy Industries, Nagasaki	29 March 1938	1 November 1940	5 August 1942	Sunk by aircraft during the Battle of the Sibuyan Sea, 24 October 1944
Shinano	Shinano Province	Yokosuka Naval Arsenal	4 May 1940	8 October 1944	19 November 1944	Converted into aircraft carrier, July 1942; Torpedoed and sunk by USS Archerfish, 28 November 1944
Warship Number 111	—N/a	Kure Naval Arsenal	7 November 1940	—N/a	—N/a	Cancelled March 1942 when 30% complete; Scrapped in place
Warship Number 797	—N/a	—N/a	—N/a	—N/a	—N/a	Cancelled during planning

=== Yamato ===
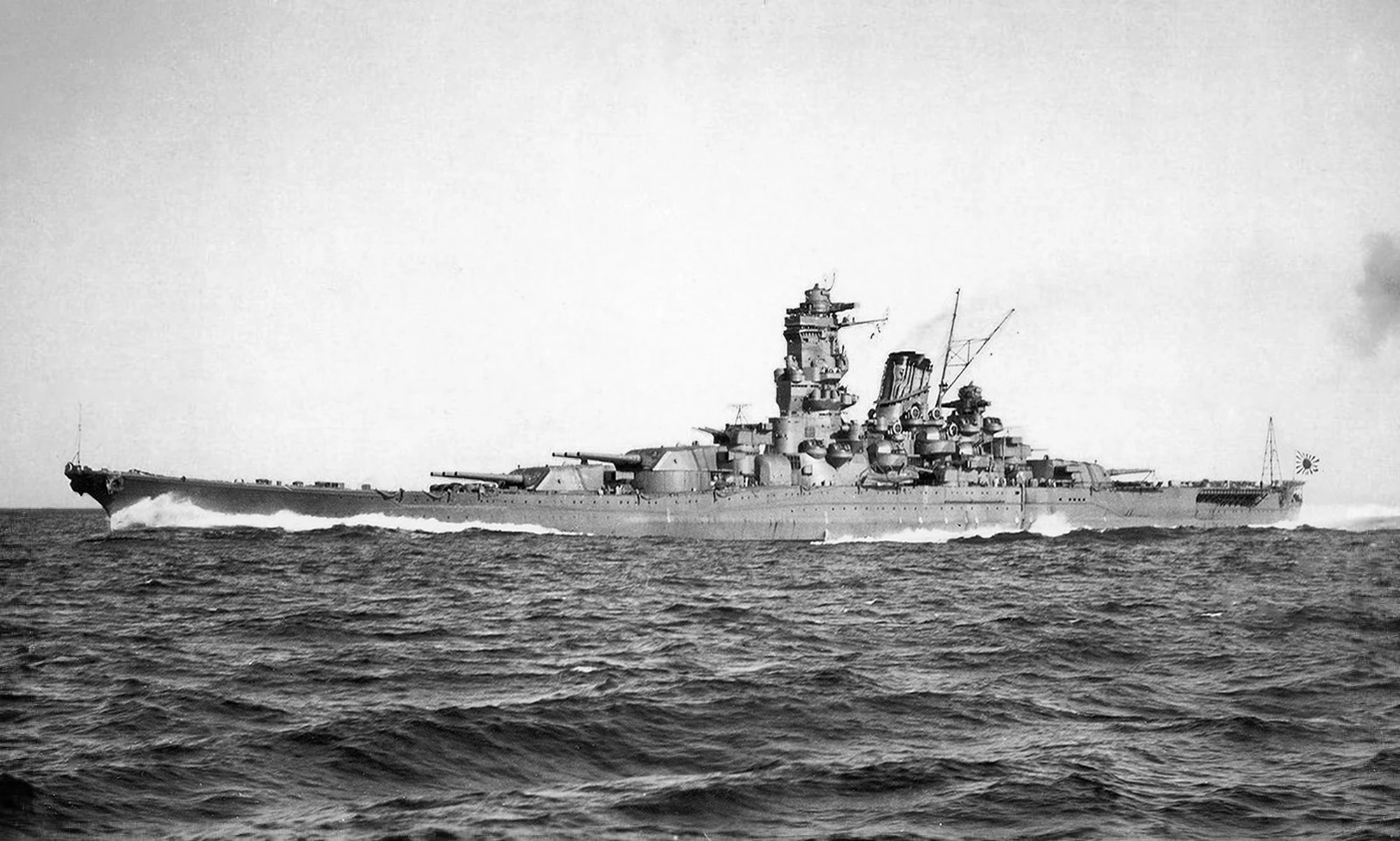
Yamato on trials in 1941

Yamato was ordered in March 1937, laid down 4 November 1937, launched 8 August 1940, and commissioned 16 December 1941. She underwent training exercises until 27 May 1942, when the vessel was deemed "operable" by Admiral Isoroku Yamamoto. Joining the 1st Battleship Division, Yamato served as the flagship of the Japanese Combined Fleet during the Battle of Midway in June 1942, yet did not engage enemy forces during the battle. The next two years were spent intermittently between Truk and Kure naval bases, with her sister ship Musashi replacing Yamato as the flagship of the Combined Fleet. During this time, Yamato, as part of the 1st Battleship Division, deployed on multiple occasions to counteract American carrier raids on Japanese island bases. On 25 December 1943, she suffered major torpedo damage at the hands of USS Skate and was forced to return to Kure for repairs and structural upgrades.

In 1944—following extensive antiaircraft and secondary battery upgrades—Yamato joined the Second Fleet in the Battle of the Philippine Sea, serving as an escort to a Japanese Carrier Division. In October 1944, as part of Vice Admiral Takeo Kurita's Center Force for the Battle of Leyte Gulf, she used her naval artillery against an enemy vessel for the only time, helping sink the American escort carrier Gambier Bay and the destroyer Johnston before she was forced away by torpedoes from Heermann, which put her out of combat. Lightly damaged at Kure in March 1945, the ship was then rearmed in preparation for operations. Yamato was deliberately expended in a suicide mission as part of Operation Ten-Go, sent to use her big guns to provide relief to Japanese forces engaged in the Battle of Okinawa. While en route, she was sunk on 7 April 1945 by 386 American carrier aircraft. After receiving 10 torpedo and seven bomb hits, she capsized, taking 2,498 of the 2,700 crew members with her, including Vice Admiral Seiichi Itō. The sinking of Yamato was seen as a major American victory, and Hanson W. Baldwin, the military editor of The New York Times, wrote, "the sinking of the new Japanese battleship Yamato ... is striking proof—if any were needed—of the fatal weakness of Japan in the air and at sea".

=== Musashi ===
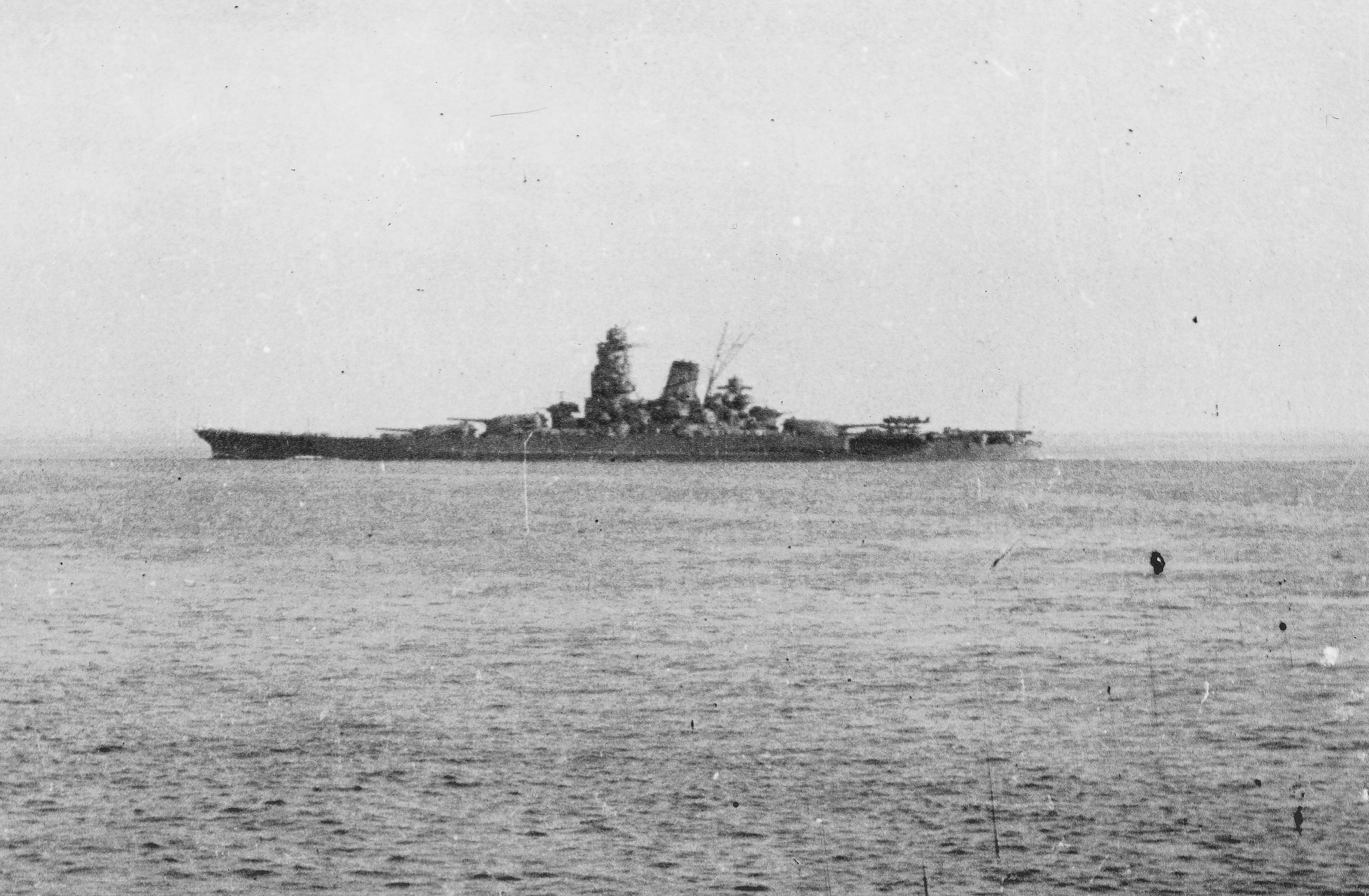
Musashi departing Brunei in October 1944

Musashi was ordered in March 1937, laid down 29 March 1938, launched 1 November 1940, and commissioned 5 August 1942. From September to December 1942, she was involved in surface and air-combat training exercises at Hashirajima. On 11 February 1943, Musashi relieved her sister ship Yamato as the flagship of the Combined Fleet. Until July 1944, Musashi shifted between the naval bases of Truk, Yokosuka, Brunei, and Kure. On 29 March 1944, she sustained moderate damage near the bow from one torpedo fired by the American submarine Tunny. After repairs and refitting throughout April 1944, Musashi joined the 1st Battleship Division in Okinawa.

In June 1944, as part of the Second Fleet, the ship escorted Japanese aircraft carriers during the Battle of the Philippine Sea. In October 1944, she left Brunei as part of Admiral Takeo Kurita's Center Force during the Battle of Leyte Gulf. Musashi was sunk 24 October during the Battle of the Sibuyan Sea, taking 17 bomb and 19 torpedo hits, with the loss of 1,023 of her 2,399-man crew.

=== Shinano ===
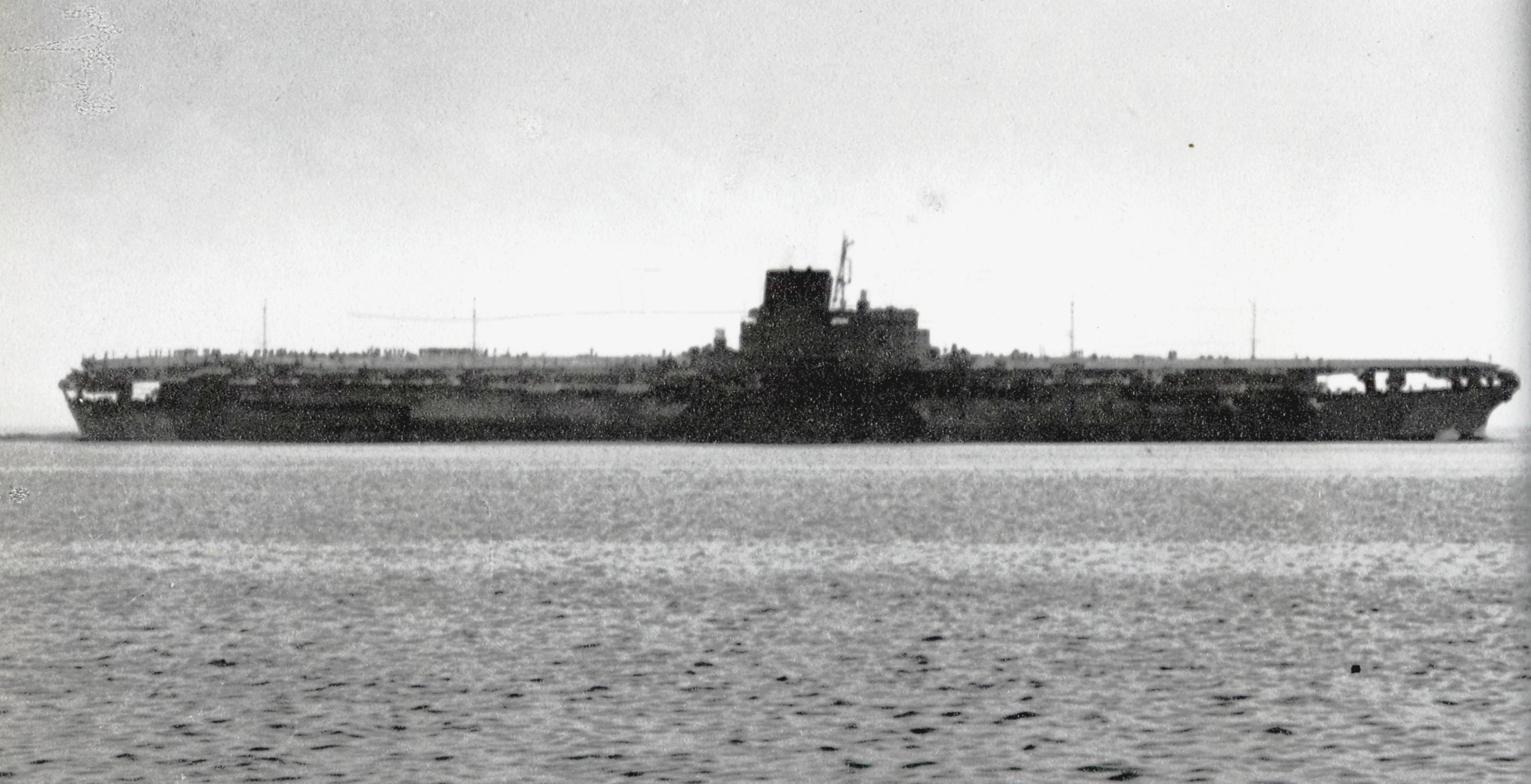
Shinano in November 1944

Shinano, originally Warship Number 110, was laid down as the third member of the Yamato class, albeit with a slightly modified design. Most of the original armor values were slightly reduced, including the belt, deck, and turrets, saving weight that allowed improvement in other areas, including added protection for fire control and lookout positions. In addition, the 12.7 cm (5.0 in) secondary armament on the first two Yamatos was to have been replaced by the 10 cm (3.9 in)/65 caliber Type 98 gun which, although smaller, had significantly greater muzzle velocity, maximum range, antiaircraft ceiling, and rate of fire than the 127 mm.

In June 1942, following the Japanese defeat at Midway, construction of Shinano was suspended, and the hull was gradually rebuilt as an aircraft carrier. She was designed as a 64,800-ton support vessel capable of ferrying, repairing, and replenishing the air fleets of other carriers. Although originally scheduled for commissioning in early 1945, construction was accelerated after the Battle of the Philippine Sea; Shinano was launched on 5 October 1944 and commissioned on 19 November. Shinano departed Yokosuka for Kure nine days later. In the early morning on 29 November, she was hit by four torpedoes from USS Archerfish. Although the damage seemed manageable, poor flood control caused the vessel to list to starboard, and she capsized and sank shortly before midday, taking 1,435 of her 2,400-man crew with her. As of 2026 Shinano is the largest naval vessel to have been sunk by a submarine.

=== Warships Number 111 and 797 ===
Warship Number 111, never named, was planned as the fourth member of the Yamato class and the second ship to incorporate the improvements of Shinano. The ship's keel was laid after Yamato's launch in August 1940 and construction continued until December 1941, when the Japanese began to question their ambitious capital ship-building program—with the coming of war, the resources essential in constructing the ship would become much harder to obtain. As a result, the hull of the fourth vessel, only about 30% complete, was taken apart and scrapped in 1942; materials from this were used in the conversions of Ise and Hyūga to hybrid battleship/aircraft carriers. (Note: Although the hull was scrapped, the double bottom was not; later construction of four large submarines took place on top of it. See: Garzke and Dulin, p. 84. Available sources do not report when the double bottom was scrapped.)

The fifth vessel, Warship Number 797, was planned as an improved Shinano, but was never laid down. In addition to the modifications made to that ship, 797 would have removed the two 155 mm (6.1 in) wing turrets in favor of additional 100 mm guns; authors William Garzke and Robert Dulin estimate that this would have allowed for 24 of these weapons. Yamato was eventually modified in 1944 to something akin to this.

== Specifications ==
=== Armaments ===
==== Primary armament ====
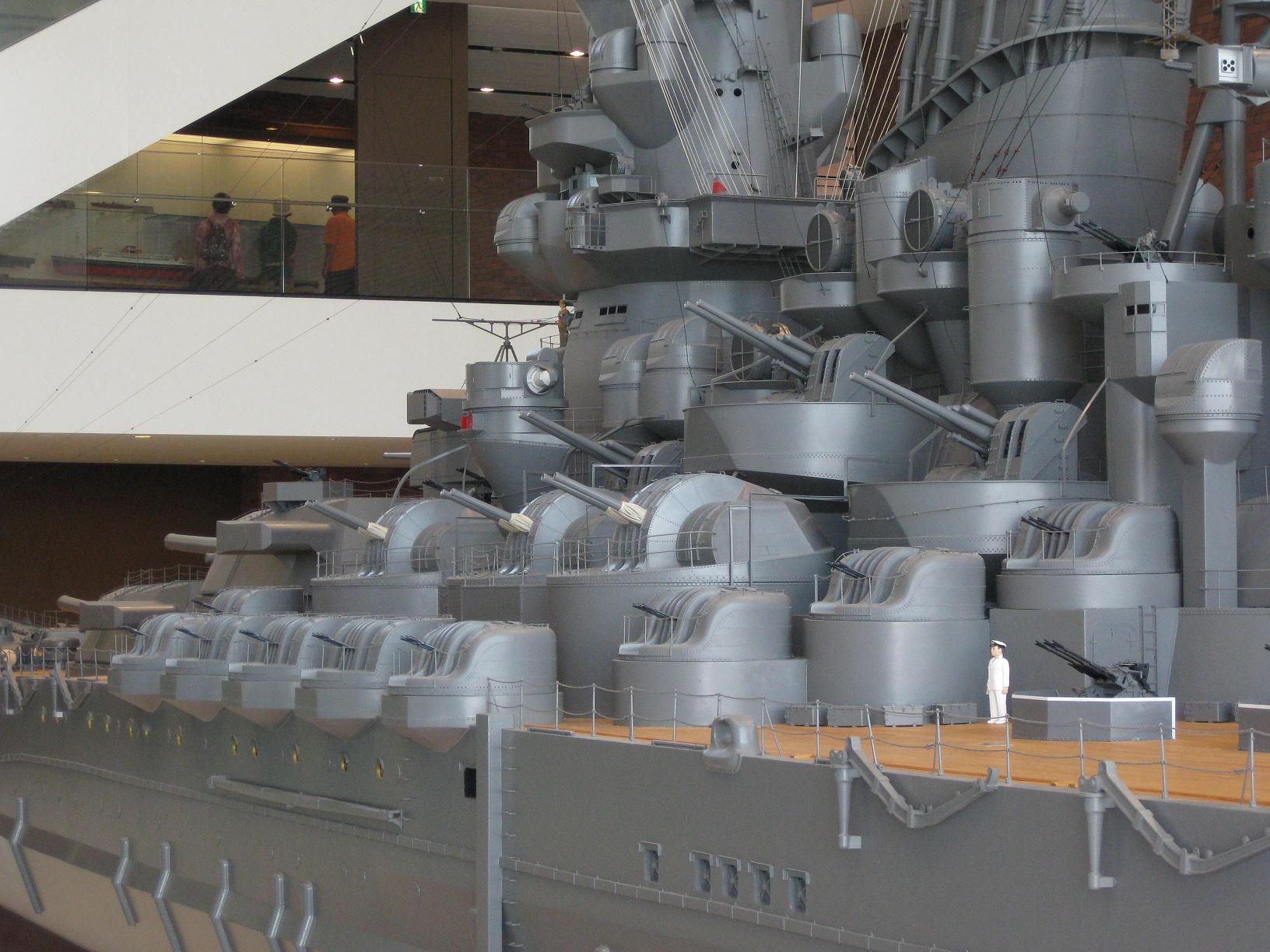
Yamato's port-side anti-aircraft armament as depicted on the model of the ship at the 'Yamato Museum' in Kure

The Yamato-class battleships had primary armaments consisting of three triple-gun turrets mounting 46 cm (18.1 in)/45 caliber Type 94 naval guns – the largest guns ever fitted to a warship, although they were officially designated as the 40 cm/45 caliber (15.9 in) Type 94 – each of which weighed 2,774 tonnes for the complete mount. Each gun was 21.13 m (69.3 ft) long and weighed 147.3 metric tons (145.0 long tons), and could fire 1,460 kg (3,220 lb) armor-piercing shells and 1,360 kg (3,000 lb) high explosive shells out to 42.0 km (26.1 mi) at a rate of 1 1/2 to 2 shells per minute.

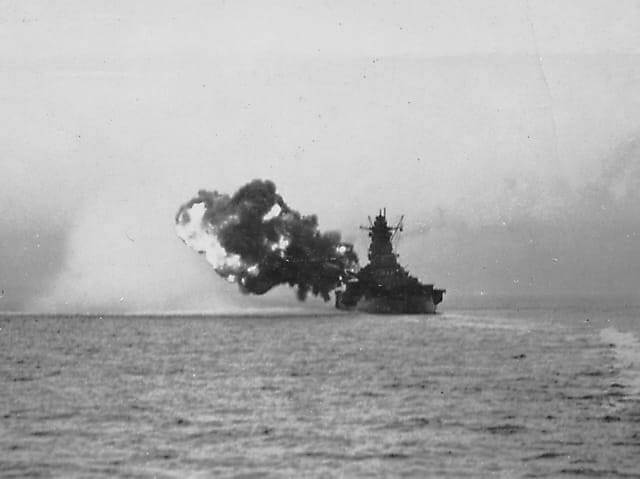
Musashi firing her main guns on sea trials, 26 July 1942

The main guns were also capable of firing 1,360 kg (3,000 lb) 3 Shiki tsûjôdan ("Common Type 3") antiaircraft shells. (Note: These shells may have been nicknamed "The Beehive" while in service. See: DiGiulian, Tony (23 April 2007). "Japanese 40 cm/45 (18.1") Type 94, 46 cm/45 (18.1") Type 94". Navweaps.com. Archived from the original on 19 May 2011.) A time fuze was used to set how far away the shells would explode, commonly 1,000 m (1,100 yd) away. Upon detonation, each shell would release 900 incendiary-filled tubes in a 20° cone facing towards incoming aircraft, then the shell itself would explode into steel splinters. The tubes would then ignite and burn for five seconds at about 3,000 °C (5,430 °F), starting a flame about 5 m (16 ft) long. Although they comprised 40% of the total main ammunition load by 1944, 3 Shiki tsûjôdan shells were rarely used in combat, as firing them severely damaged the barrels of the main guns; indeed, one of the shells may have exploded early and disabled one of Musashi's guns during the Battle of the Sibuyan Sea. The shells were intended to put up a barrage of flame that any attacking aircraft would have to fly through; however, U.S. pilots considered them to be more of a pyrotechnics display than a competent antiaircraft weapon.

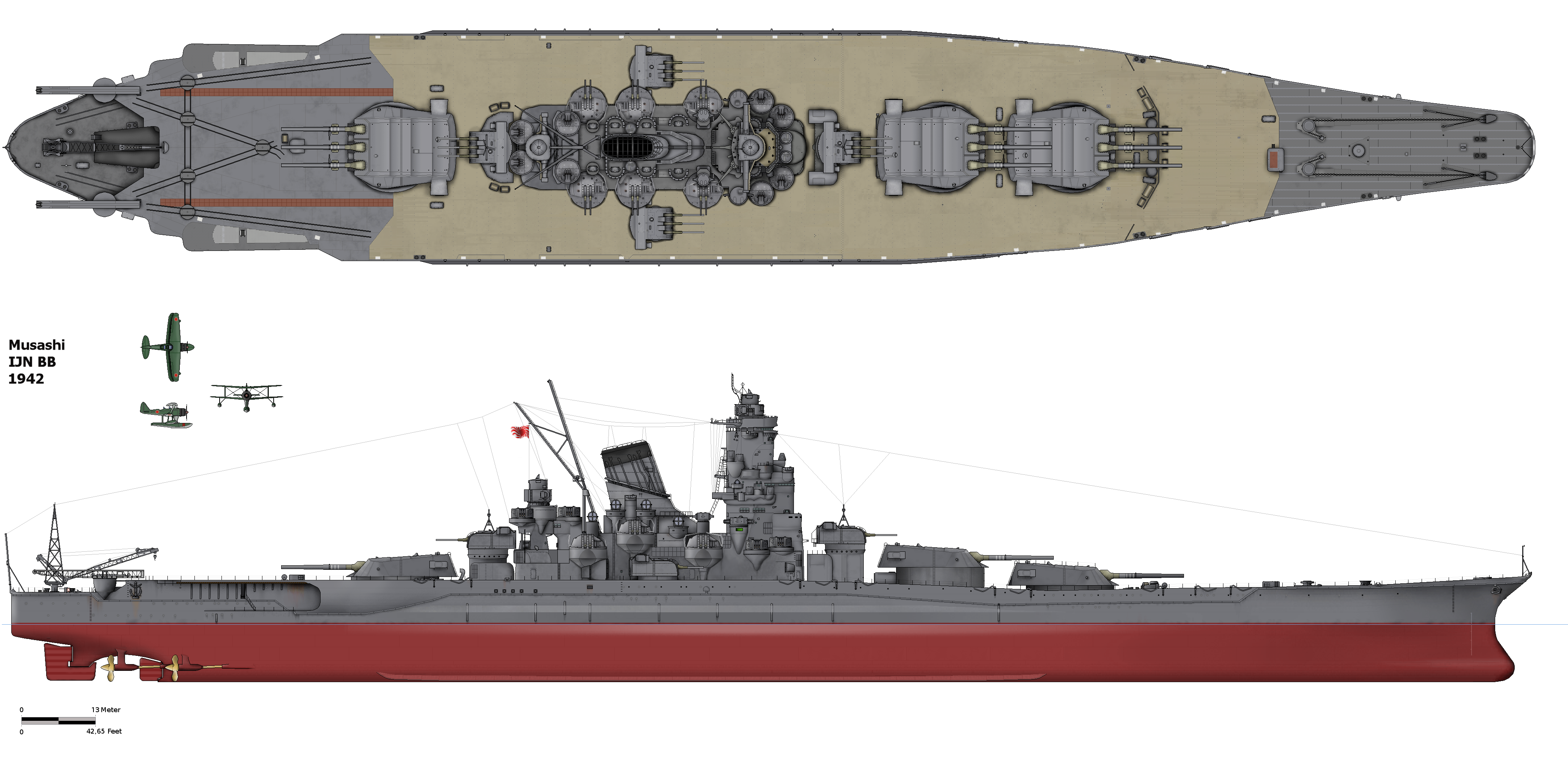
Musashi as she appeared in 1942; compare this to the 1944 and 1945 configurations of the class, which removed the amidship 15.5 cm turrets to make way for additional antiaircraft guns of 12.7 cm/40 Type 89 and 25 mm Type 96 varieties

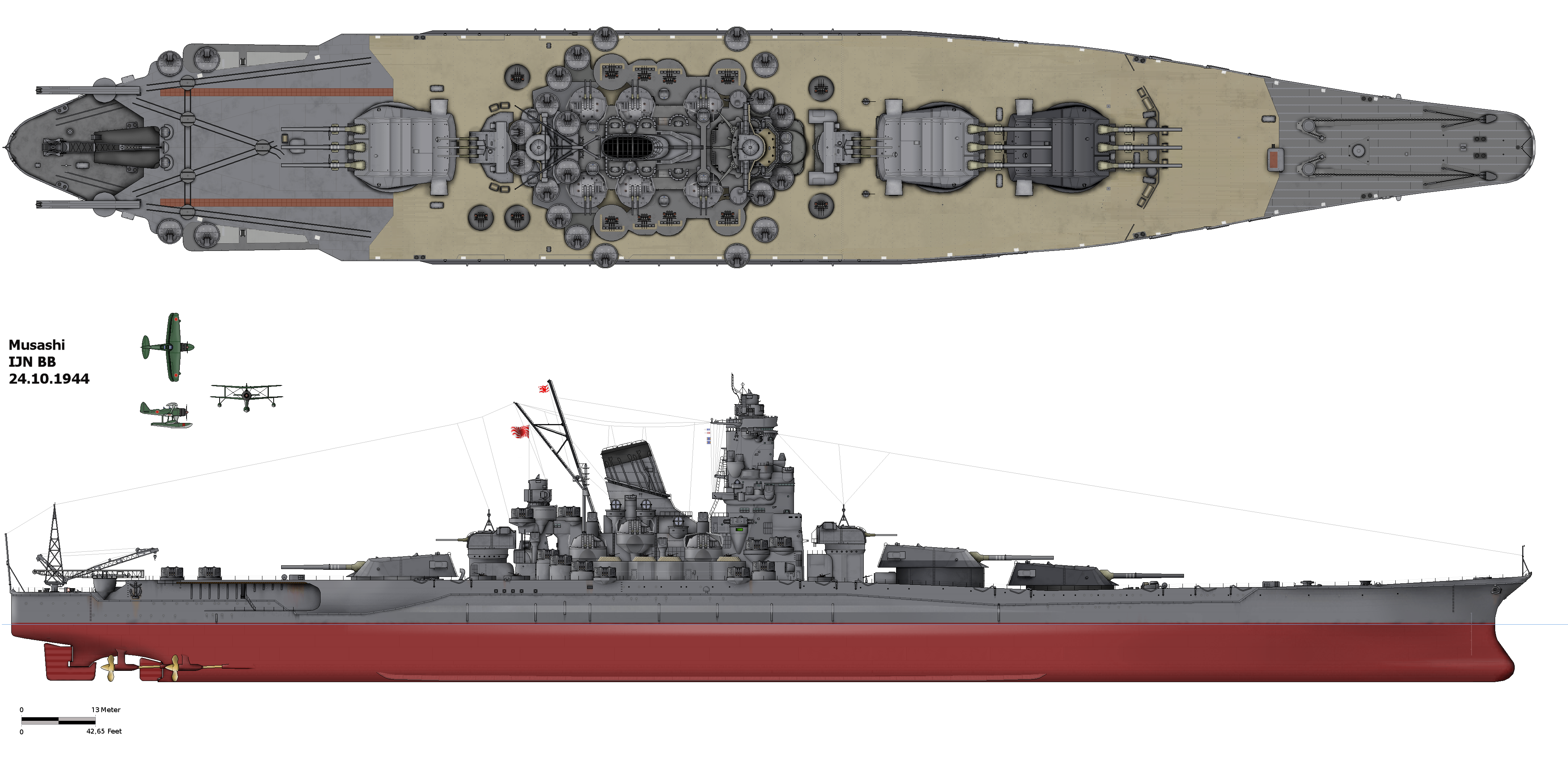
Musashi as she appeared in mid-1944

==== Secondary armament ====
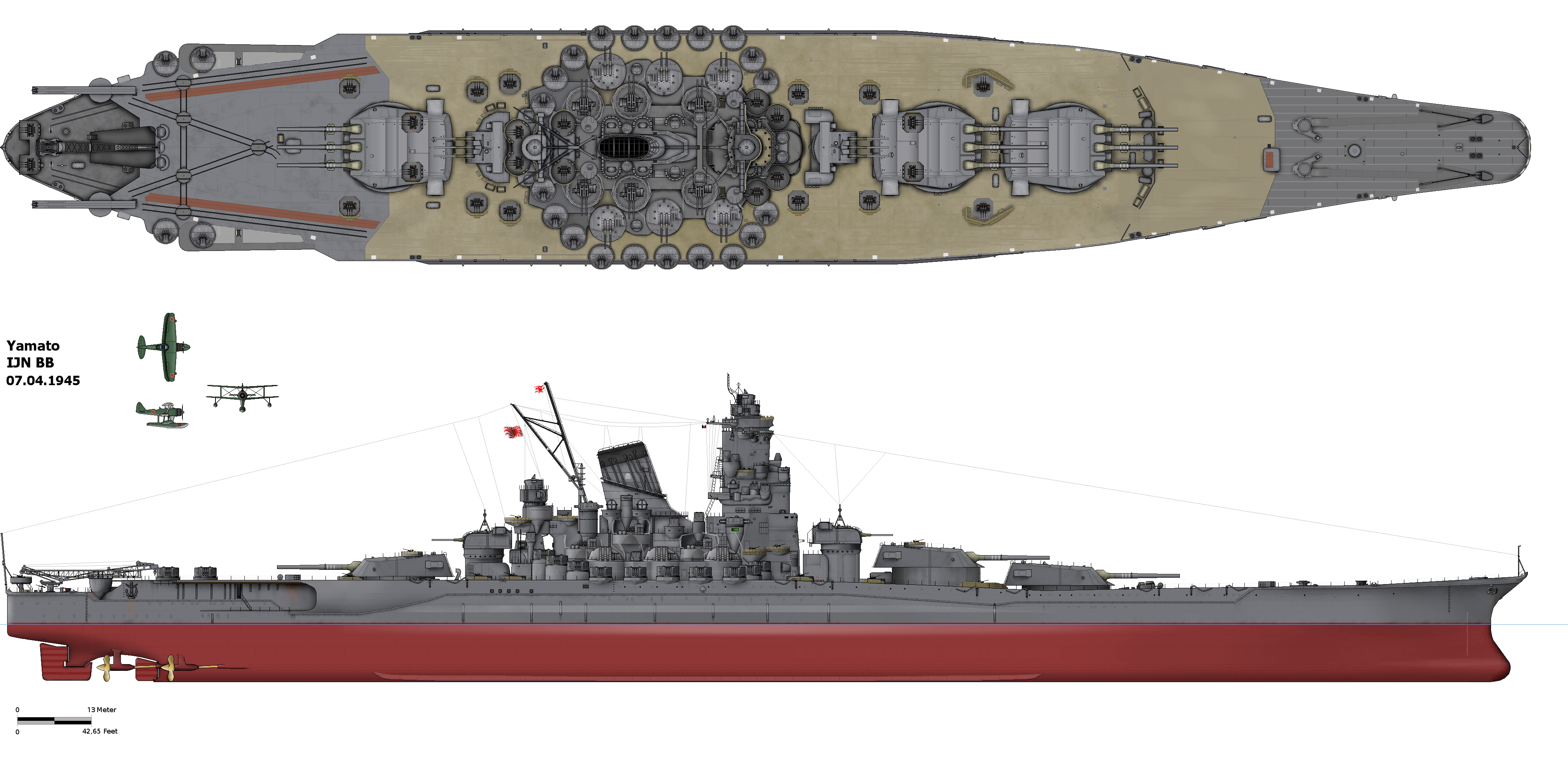
Yamato as she appeared c. 1945 (specific configuration from 7 April 1945)

In the original design, the Yamato class' secondary armament comprised twelve 15.5 cm/60 Type 3 guns mounted in four triple-gun turrets (one forward, two amidships, one aft), and twelve 12.7 cm/40 Type 89 guns in six double turrets (three on each side amidships). These had become available once the Mogami-class cruisers were rearmed with 20.3 cm (8.0 in) guns. With a 55.87 kg (123.2 lb) AP shell, the guns had a maximum range of 27,400 metres (30,000 yd) at an elevation of 45 degrees. Their rate of fire was five rounds per minute. The two midships turrets were removed in 1944 in favor of additional 127 mm (5.0 in) heavy and 25 mm (0.98 in) light anti-aircraft guns.

Initially, heavy antiaircraft defense was provided by a dozen 40-caliber 127-mm Type 89 dual-purpose guns in six double turrets, three on each side of the superstructure. In 1944, the two amidship 15.5 cm turrets were removed to make room for three additional 127-mm mounts on each side of Yamato, bringing the total number of these guns to 24. When firing at surface targets, the guns had a range of 14,700 m (16,100 yd); they had a maximum ceiling of 9,440 m (30,970 ft) at their maximum elevation of 90°. Their maximum rate of fire was 14 rounds/minute; their sustained rate of fire was around 8 rounds/minute.

==== Anti-aircraft armament ====
The Yamato class originally carried twenty-four 25 mm Type 96 antiaircraft guns, primarily mounted amidships. In 1944, both Yamato and Musashi underwent significant anti-aircraft upgrades in preparation for operations in Leyte Gulf using the space freed up by the removal of both midships 15.5 cm (6.1 in) secondary battery turrets, and ended up with a complement of twenty-four 12.7 cm (5.0 in) guns, and one hundred and sixty-two 25 mm (0.98 in) antiaircraft (AA) guns, The 25 mm AA guns could tilt at 90° angles to aim at planes directly overhead, but their mountings' lack of protection made their gunnery crews extremely vulnerable to direct enemy fire. These 25 mm (0.98 in) guns had an effective range of 1,500–3,000 m (1,600–3,300 yd) and an effective ceiling of 5,500 m (18,000 ft) at an elevation of +85°. The maximum effective rate of fire was only between 110 and 120 rounds/minute because of the frequent need to change the 15-round magazines. This was the standard Japanese light AA gun during World War II; it suffered from severe design shortcomings that rendered it a largely ineffective weapon. According to historian Mark Stille, the twin and triple mounts "lacked sufficient speed in train or elevation; the gun sights were unable to handle fast targets; the gun exhibited excessive vibration; the magazine was too small, and ... the gun produced excessive muzzle blast".

The class was also provided with two twin mounts for the licence-built 13.2 mm Type 93 AA machine guns, one on each side of the bridge. The maximum range of these guns was 6,500 m (7,100 yd), but the effective range against aircraft was only 1,000 m (1,100 yd). The cyclic rate was adjustable between 425 and 475 rounds/minute; the need to change 30-round magazines reduced the effective rate to 250 rounds/minute.

The armament on Shinano was quite different from that of her sister vessels due to her conversion. As the carrier was designed for a support role, significant AA weaponry was installed on the vessel: sixteen 12.7 cm (5.0 in) guns, one hundred forty-five 25 mm (0.98 in) AA guns, and three hundred and thirty-six 5 in (13 cm) AA rocket launchers in twelve 28-barrel turrets. None of these guns was ever used against an enemy vessel or aircraft.

=== Armor ===
Protection schematic at the rear turret; amidships schematic here

Designed to engage multiple enemy battleships simultaneously, the Yamatos were fitted with heavy armor plating described by naval historian Mark Stille as providing "an unparalleled degree of protection in surface combat". The main belt of armor along the side of the vessel was up to 410 mm (16 in) thick, with transverse bulkheads of the armoured citadel up to 355 mm (14.0 in) thick. A lower belt armor 200 millimetres (7.9 in) thick extending below the main belt was included in the ships as a response to gunnery experiments upon Tosa and the new Japanese Type 91 shell, which could travel great lengths underwater. Furthermore, the top hull shape was very advanced, the peculiar sideways curving effectively maximizing armor protection and structural rigidity while optimizing weight. The armor on the main turrets surpassed even that of the main belt, with turret face plating 650 mm (26 in) thick. Armor plates in both the main belt and main turrets were made of Vickers Hardened steel, which was a face-hardened steel armor. Main armored deck—200 mm (7.9 in) thick—was composed of a nickel-chromium-molybdenum alloy. Ballistics tests at the proving ground at Kamegakubi demonstrated the deck alloy to be superior to the homogeneous Vickers plates by 10–15%. Additional plating was designed by manipulating the chromium and nickel composition of the alloy. Higher contents of nickel allowed the plate to be rolled and bent without developing fractures.

For torpedo protection, a multiple-bulkhead side-protection system was used, which consisted of several void spaces, as well as the lower belt armor; the system has a depth of 5.1 m (17 ft) and was designed to withstand a 400 kg (880 lb) TNT charge. No torpedo defense system compartments were liquid loaded, despite the known benefits. This may have been the result of overestimating the effectiveness of the lower belt armor against torpedoes, an effort to decrease draft, and provision of additional counter-flooding spaces.

The relatively new procedure of arc welding was used extensively throughout the ship, strengthening the durability of the armor plating. Through this technique, the lower-side belt armor was used to strengthen the hull structure of the entire vessel. In total, the vessels of the Yamato class contained 1,147 watertight compartments, of which 1,065 were beneath the armored deck. The ships were also designed with a very large amount of reserve buoyancy to mitigate the effects of flooding.

However, despite the immense armor thickness, the protection scheme of the Yamato class still suffered from several major design flaws and shortcomings. Structural weakness existed near the bow of the vessels, where the armor plating was generally thinner, as demonstrated by Musashi's damage from a torpedo hit in 1943. The hull of the Shinano was subject to even greater structural weakness, being hastily constructed near the end of the war and having been equipped with incomplete armor and unsealed watertight compartments at the time of her sinking. The torpedo defense system performed substantially worse than designed. In particular, very poor jointing between the upper-belt and lower-belt armor created a rupture-prone seam just below the waterline. When combined with the relatively shallow system depth and the lack of liquid loading, this caused the class to be susceptible to torpedoes. Joint failures may have contributed significantly to the considerable damage inflicted upon Yamato from a single torpedo impact in 1943 and to the sinking of Shinano from four hits in 1944.

=== Propulsion ===
The Yamato class was fitted with 12 Kampon boilers, which powered quadruple steam turbines, with an indicated horsepower of 147,948 (110,325 kW). These, in turn, drove four 6 m (20 ft) propellers. This powerplant enabled the Yamato class to achieve a top speed of 27 knots (50 km/h). With this speed, the Yamato class' ability to function alongside fast carriers was limited. In addition, the fuel consumption rate of both battleships was very high. As a result, neither battleship was used in combat during the Solomon Islands Campaign or the minor battles during the "island hopping" period of 1943 and early 1944. The propulsion system of Shinano was slightly improved, allowing the carrier to achieve a top speed of 28 kn (52 km/h).

== "Super Yamato"-class battleships ==
Two battleships of an entirely new and larger design were planned as a part of the 1942 fleet replenishment program. Designated as Design A-150 and initially named Warship Number 178 and Warship Number 179, plans for the ships began soon after the design of the Yamato class was finished, probably in 1938–39. Everything was "essentially completed" sometime in 1941, but with war on the horizon, work on the battleships was halted to fill a need for additional warships, such as aircraft carriers and cruisers, to replace war losses of those vital ships. The Japanese loss in the Battle of Midway, where four carriers were sunk (out of ten, at that time, in the entire navy), made it certain that work on the ships would never begin. In the third volume of their Battleships series, Axis and Neutral Battleships in World War II, the authors William H. Garzke and Robert O. Dulin asserted that these ships would have been the "most powerful battleships in history" because of their massive 51 cm (20 in) main battery and extensive anti-aircraft weaponry.

Similar to the fate of papers relating to the Yamato class, most papers and all plans relating to the class were destroyed to prevent capture at the end of the war. It is known that the final design of the ships would have had an even greater firepower and size than the Yamato class—a main battery of six 51 cm (20 in) guns in three turrets and secondary dual purpose armament consisting of twenty-four 10 cm (3.9 in) dual mounted guns (similar to the Akizuki-class destroyers). The displacement was to be bigger than the Yamato's, and a side armor belt of 46 cm (18 in) was planned.

== Destruction of records ==
On the eve of the Allies' occupation of Japan, special-service officers of the Imperial Japanese Navy destroyed virtually all records, drawings, and photographs of or relating to the Yamato-class battleships, leaving only fragmentary records of the design characteristics and other technical matters. The destruction of these documents was so efficient that until 1948 the only known images of Yamato and Musashi were those taken by United States Navy aircraft involved in the attacks on the two battleships. Although some additional photographs and information, from documents that were not destroyed, have come to light over the years, the loss of the majority of written records for the class has made extensive research into the Yamato class somewhat difficult. Because of the lack of written records, information on the class largely came from interviews of Japanese officers following Japan's surrender.

However, in October 1942, on special request from Adolf Hitler, the German naval attaché in Japan, Admiral Paul Wenneker, was allowed to inspect a Yamato-class battleship while it was undergoing maintenance in a dockyard. Wenneker cabled a detailed description of the warship to Berlin. On 22 August 1943, Erich Gröner, a German naval historian, later author of the book Die Deutschen Kriegschiffe, 1815–1945, was shown the report while at the "Führer Headquarters", and was directed to make an "interpretation" and then prepare a "design sketch drawing" of the Japanese battleship. The material was preserved by Erich Groner's wife, and submitted to publishers in the 1950s.

== Cultural significance ==
The 1:10 scale model at the Yamato Museum

From the time of their construction until the present day, Yamato and Musashi have carried a notable presence in Japanese culture, Yamato in particular. Upon completion, the battleships represented the epitome of Imperial Japanese naval engineering. In addition, the two ships, due to their size, speed, and power, visibly embodied Japan's determination and readiness to defend its interests against the Western powers, especially the United States. Shigeru Fukudome, chief of the Operations Section of the Imperial Japanese Navy General Staff, described the two ships as "symbols of naval power that provided to officers and men alike a profound sense of confidence in their navy."

Yamato, and especially the story of her sinking, has appeared often in Japanese popular culture. The appearances usually portray the ship's last mission as a brave, selfless, but futile, symbolic effort by the participating Japanese sailors to defend their homeland. One of the reasons that the warship may have such significance in Japanese culture is that the word "Yamato" was often used as a poetic name for Japan. Thus, the end of the battleship Yamato could serve as a metaphor for the end of the Empire of Japan.

== See also ==
- H-class battleship proposals—World War II German Kriegsmarine
- Japanese munition ship Kashino Purpose-built ship to carry main gun turrets and barrels of the class
- Yamato Museum
