= Japanese battleship Musashi =

Yamato-class battleship of the Imperial Japanese Navy

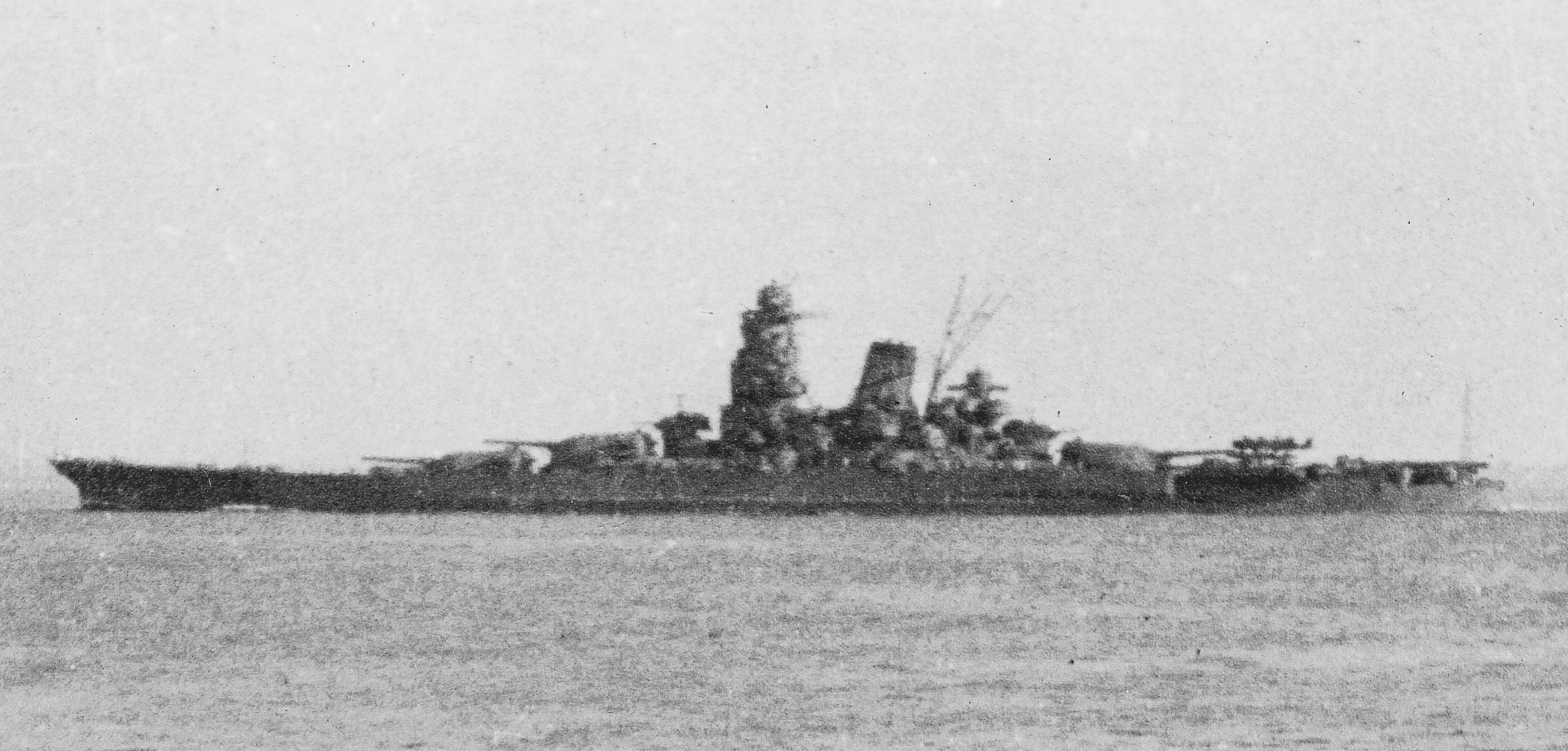
- Musashi departing Brunei on 22 October 1944 for the Battle of Leyte Gulf, where she was sunk by air attack

History

Japan
- Name: Musashi
- Namesake: Province of Musashi
- Ordered: June 1937
- Builder: Mitsubishi Shipyard, Nagasaki
- Laid down: 29 March 1938
- Launched: 1 November 1940
- Commissioned: 5 August 1942
- Stricken: 31 August 1945
- Fate: Sunk by American air attack during the Battle of Leyte Gulf, 24 October 1944

General characteristics (as built)
- Class & type: Yamato-class battleship
- Displacement: 63,000 long tons (64,000 t) (standard)
- Length: 263 m (862 ft 10 in) (o/a)
- Beam: 38.9 m (127 ft 7 in) (waterline)
- Draft: 10.86 m (35 ft 8 in) (full load)
- Installed power: 12 × Kanpon water-tube boilers 150,000 shp (110,000 kW)
- Propulsion: 4 × propellers; 4 × steam turbines
- Speed: 27.5 knots (50.9 km/h; 31.6 mph)
- Range: 7,200 nmi (13,300 km; 8,300 mi) at 16 knots (30 km/h; 18 mph)
- Complement: 2,500
- Sensors & processing systems: 1 × Type 21 air search radar; 1 × Type 0 hydrophone system
- Armament: 3 × triple 460 mm (18 in) guns; 4 × triple 155 mm (6.1 in) guns; 6 × twin 127 mm (5 in) DP guns; 12 × triple 25 mm (1 in) AA guns; 2 × twin 13.2 mm (0.52 in) AA machine guns
- Armour: Waterline belt: 410 mm (16.1 in); Deck: 200–230 mm (7.9–9.1 in); Gun turrets: 250–650 mm (9.8–25.6 in); Barbettes: 380–560 mm (15–22 in)
- Aircraft carried: 6–7 × floatplanes
- Aviation facilities: 2 × catapults

Musashi (Japanese: 武蔵; named after the former Japanese province) was one of the Yamato-class battleships (Note: Four ships were begun, but only two were completed as battleships. The third, Shinano, was completed as an aircraft carrier and the fourth was scrapped before completion.) built for the Imperial Japanese Navy (IJN), beginning in the late 1930s. The Yamato-class ships were the heaviest and most powerfully armed battleships ever constructed, displacing almost 72,000 long tons (73,000 t) fully loaded and armed with nine 460-millimetre (18.1 in) main guns. Their secondary armament consisted of four 155-millimetre (6.1 in) triple-gun turrets formerly used by the Mogami-class cruisers. They were equipped with six or seven floatplanes to conduct reconnaissance.

Commissioned in mid-1942, Musashi was modified to serve as the flagship of the Combined Fleet, and spent the rest of the year working up. The ship was transferred to Truk, Japan's main wartime naval base in the South Pacific theatre, in early 1943 and sortied several times that year with the fleet in unsuccessful searches for American forces. She was used to transfer forces and equipment between Japan and various occupied islands several times in 1944. Torpedoed in early 1944 by an American submarine, Musashi was forced to return to Japan for repairs, during which the navy greatly augmented her anti-aircraft armament. She was present during the Battle of the Philippine Sea in June, but did not come in contact with American surface forces. During the Battle of Leyte Gulf, Musashi was sunk by an estimated 19 torpedo and 17 bomb hits from American carrier-based aircraft on 24 October 1944. Over half of her crew was rescued. Her wreck was located in March 2015 by a team of researchers employed by Microsoft co-founder Paul Allen.

== Design and description ==
Since the IJN anticipated it would be unable to produce as many ships as the United States, the Yamato-class ships with their great size and heavy armament were designed to be individually superior to American battleships. Musashi had a length of 244 metres (800 ft 6 in) between perpendiculars and 263 metres (862 ft 10 in) overall. She had a waterline beam of 38.9 metres (127 ft 7 in) and a draught of 10.86 metres (35 ft 8 in) at deep load. She displaced 64,000 long tons (65,000 t) at standard load and 71,659 long tons (72,809 t) at deep load. Her crew consisted of 2,500 officers and ratings in 1942, and about 2,800 in 1944.

The battleship had four sets of Kampon geared steam turbines, each of which drove one propeller shaft. The turbines were designed to produce a total of 150,000 shaft horsepower (110,000 kW), using steam provided by 12 Kampon water-tube boilers, giving the ship a maximum speed of 27.5 knots (50.9 km/h; 31.6 mph). She had a stowage capacity of 6,300 long tons (6,400 t) of fuel oil, giving a range of 7,200 nautical miles (13,300 km; 8,300 mi) at a speed of 16 knots (30 km/h; 18 mph).

=== Armament ===
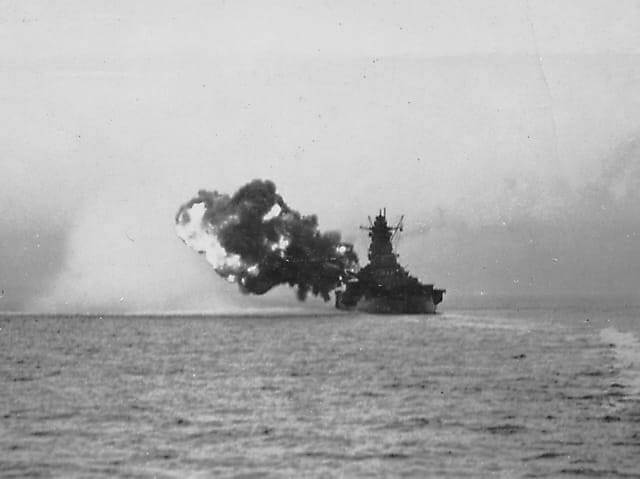
Musashi firing her 46 cm guns during sea trials off the Iyonada Strait, 26 July 1942

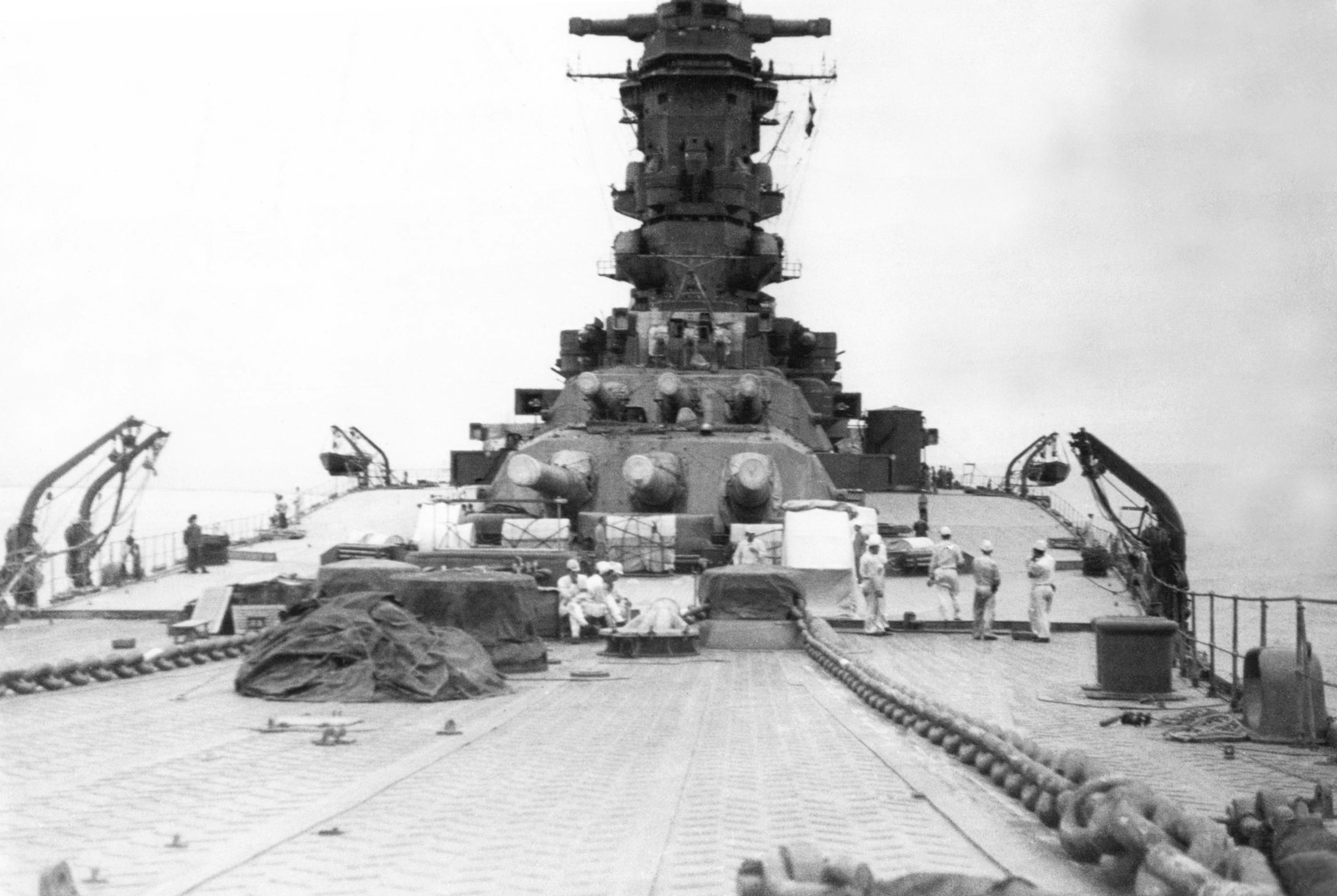
Musashi seen from the bow, August 1942

Musashi's main battery consisted of nine 45-calibre 460-millimetre Type 94 guns mounted in three triple gun turrets, numbered from front to rear. The guns had a rate of fire of 1.5 to 2 rounds per minute. The ship's secondary battery consisted of twelve 60-calibre 155-millimetre 3rd Year Type guns mounted in four triple turrets, one each fore and aft of the superstructure and one on each side amidships. These had become available once the Mogami-class cruisers were rearmed with 200-millimetre (7.9 in) guns. Heavy anti-aircraft defence was provided by a dozen 40-calibre 127-millimetre (5 in) Type 89 dual-purpose guns in six twin turrets, three on each side of the superstructure. Musashi also carried thirty-six 25-millimetre (1 in) Type 96 light anti-aircraft (AA) guns in 12 triple-gun mounts, all mounted on the superstructure. The ship was also provided with two twin mounts for the licence-built 13.2-millimetre (0.52 in) Type 93 anti-aircraft machine guns, one on each side of the bridge.

While the ship was under repair in April 1944, the two 155 mm wing turrets were removed and replaced with three triple 25 mm gun mounts each. A total of sixteen triple 25 mm mounts and twenty-five single mounts were added at that time, giving the ship a light AA armament of 115 guns.

=== Armour ===
The ship's waterline armour belt was identical to Yamato's at 410 millimetres (16.1 in) thick and angled outwards 20 degrees at the top. Below it was a strake of armour that ranged in thickness from 270 to 200 millimetres (10.6 to 7.9 in) over the magazines and machinery spaces, respectively; it tapered to a thickness of 75 millimetres (3.0 in) at its bottom edge. The deck armour ranged in thickness from 230 to 200 millimetres (9.1 to 7.9 in). The turrets were protected with an armour plate 650 millimetres (25.6 in) thick on the face, 250 millimetres (9.8 in) on the sides, and 270 millimetres on the roof. The barbettes of the turrets were protected by armour 560 to 280 millimetres (22.0 to 11.0 in) thick, and the turrets of the 155 mm guns were protected by 50-millimetre (2.0 in) armour plates. The sides of the conning tower were 500 millimetres (19.7 in) thick and its roof was 200 millimetres thick. Underneath the magazines were 50-to-80-millimetre (2.0 to 3.1 in) armour plates to protect the ship from mine damage. Musashi contained 1,147 watertight compartments (1,065 underneath the armour deck, 82 above) to preserve buoyancy in the event of battle damage.

=== Aircraft ===
Musashi was fitted with two catapults on her quarterdeck and could stow up to seven floatplanes in her below-decks hangar. The ship operated Mitsubishi F1M biplanes and Aichi E13A1 monoplanes and used a 6-tonne (5.9-long-ton), stern-mounted crane for recovery.

=== Fire control and sensors ===
The ship was equipped with four 15-metre (49 ft 3 in) rangefinders, one atop her forward superstructure and one in each of her main gun turrets, and another 10-metre (32 ft 10 in) unit atop her rear superstructure. Each 15.5-centimetre (6.1 in) gun turret was equipped with an 8-metre (26 ft 3 in) rangefinder. Low-angle fire was controlled by two Type 98 fire-control directors mounted above the rangefinders on the superstructure. Type 94 high-angle directors controlled the 127 mm AA guns, with Type 95 short-range directors for the 25 mm AA guns.

Musashi was built with a Type 0 hydrophone system in her bow, usable only while stationary or at low speed. In September 1942, a Type 21 air-search radar was installed on the roof of the 15-metre rangefinder at the top of the forward superstructure. Two Type 22 surface-search radars were installed on the forward superstructure in July 1943. During repairs in April 1944, the Type 21 radar was replaced by a more modern version, and a Type 13 early-warning radar was also fitted.

== Construction ==
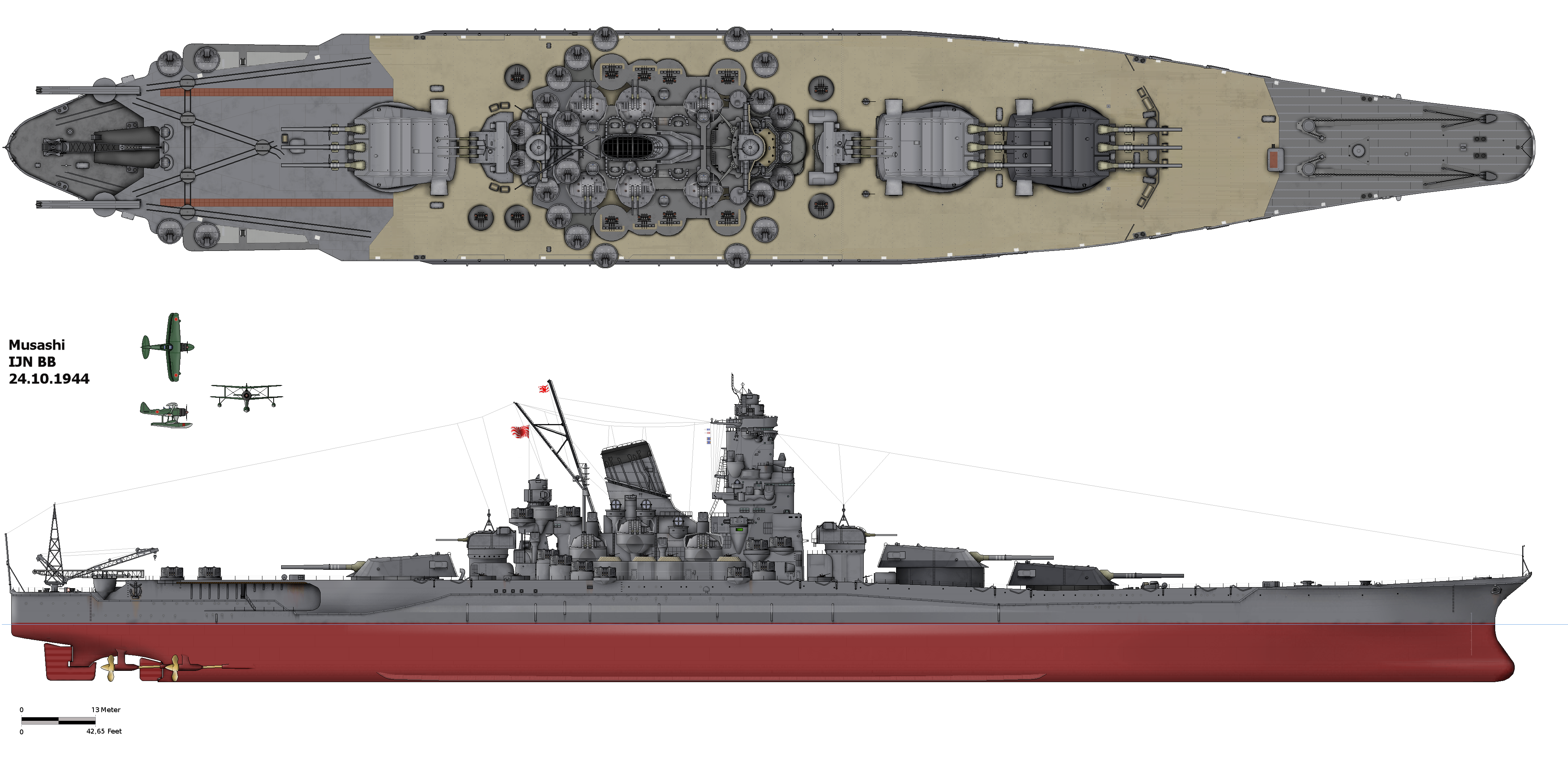
Musashi as she appeared in mid-1944

To cope with Musashi's great size and weight, the construction slipway was reinforced, nearby workshops were expanded, and two floating cranes were built. The ship's keel was laid down on 29 March 1938 at Mitsubishi's Nagasaki shipyard, and was designated "Battleship No. 2". Throughout construction, a large curtain made of hemp rope weighing 408 t (450 short tons) prevented outsiders from viewing construction. (Note: The amount of sisal rope necessary to complete the curtain was so great that it caused a shortage in the fishing industry.)

Launching the Musashi also presented challenges. The ship's 4-metre (13 ft 1 in) thick launch platform, made of nine 44 cm (17 in) Douglas fir planks bolted together, took two years to assemble (from keel-laying in March 1938) because of the difficulty in drilling perfectly straight bolt holes through 4 metres of fresh timber. The problem of slowing and stopping the massive hull once inside the narrow Nagasaki Harbour was met by attaching 570 tonnes (560 long tons) of heavy chains on both sides of the hull to create dragging resistance in the water. The launch was concealed by measures that included a citywide air-raid drill staged on launch day to keep people inside their homes. Musashi was launched on 1 November 1940, coming to a stop only 1 metre (3.3 ft) further than the hull's expected 220 metres (720 ft) travel distance across the harbour. The entry of such a large mass into the water caused a 120-centimetre-tall (3 ft 11 in) wave, which swept the harbour and local rivers, flooding homes and capsizing small fishing boats. Musashi was fitted out at nearby Sasebo, with Captain Kaoru Arima assigned as her commanding officer.

Towards the end of fitting out, the ship's flagship facilities, including those on the bridge and in the admiral's cabins, were modified to satisfy Combined Fleet's desire to have the ship equipped as the primary flagship of the commander-in-chief, as her sister ship Yamato was too far along for such changes. These alterations, along with improvements in the secondary battery armour, pushed back completion and pre-handover testing of Musashi by two months, to August 1942.

== Service ==
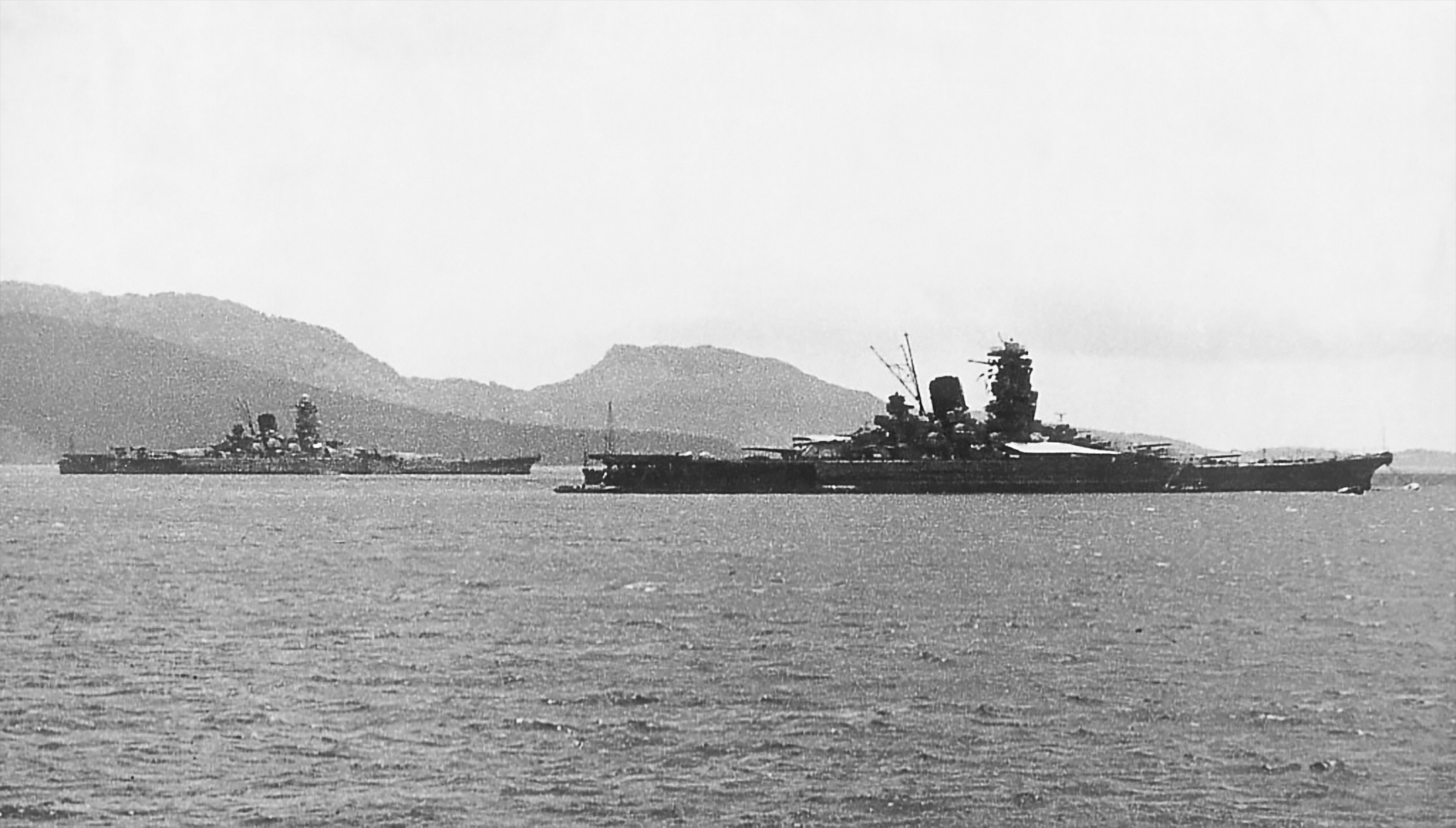
Musashi (right) and Yamato in Truk Lagoon in early 1943

Musashi was commissioned at Nagasaki on 5 August 1942, and assigned to the 1st Battleship Division, together with Yamato, Nagato and Mutsu. Beginning five days later, the ship conducted machinery and aircraft-handling trials near Hashirajima. Her secondary armament of twelve 127 mm guns, 12 triple 25 mm gun mounts, and four 13.2 mm (0.52 in) anti-aircraft machine guns was fitted 3–28 September 1942 at Kure, as well as a Type 21 radar. The ship was working up for the rest of the year. Arima was promoted to rear admiral on 1 November.

Musashi was assigned to the Combined Fleet, commanded by Admiral Isoroku Yamamoto, on 15 January 1943 and sailed for Truk three days later, arriving on 22 January. On 11 February, she replaced her sister ship Yamato as the fleet's flagship. On 3 April, Yamamoto left Musashi and flew to Rabaul, New Britain to personally direct "Operation I-Go", a Japanese aerial offensive in the Solomon Islands. His orders were intercepted and deciphered by Magic, and American Lockheed P-38 Lightning fighters shot down his transport aircraft and killed him in Operation Vengeance while he was en route from New Britain to Ballale, Bougainville. On 23 April, his cremated remains were flown back to Truk and placed in his cabin on board Musashi.

On 17 May, in response to American attacks on Attu Island, Musashi—together with the aircraft carrier Hiyō, two heavy cruisers, and nine destroyers—sortied to the northern Pacific. When no contact was made with American forces, the ships sailed to Kure on 23 May, where Yamamoto's ashes were taken from the vessel in preparation for a formal state funeral. Immediately afterwards, Musashi's task force was significantly reinforced to counterattack American naval forces off Attu, but the island was captured before the force could intervene. On 9 June, Arima was relieved by Captain Keizō Komura. On 24 June, while being overhauled at Yokosuka Naval Arsenal, Musashi was visited by Emperor Hirohito and high-ranking naval officers. From 1 to 8 July, the ship was fitted with a pair of Type 22 radars at Kure. She sailed for Truk on 30 July and arrived there six days later, where she resumed her position as fleet flagship for Admiral Mineichi Koga.

In mid-October, in response to suspicions of planned American raids on Wake Island, Musashi led a large fleet—three carriers, six battleships, and 11 cruisers—to intercept American forces, but failed to make contact and returned to Truk on 26 October. She spent the remainder of 1943 in Truk Lagoon. Komura was promoted to rear admiral on 1 November and transferred to the 3rd Fleet on 7 December as chief of staff; Captain Bunji Asakura assumed command of Musashi.

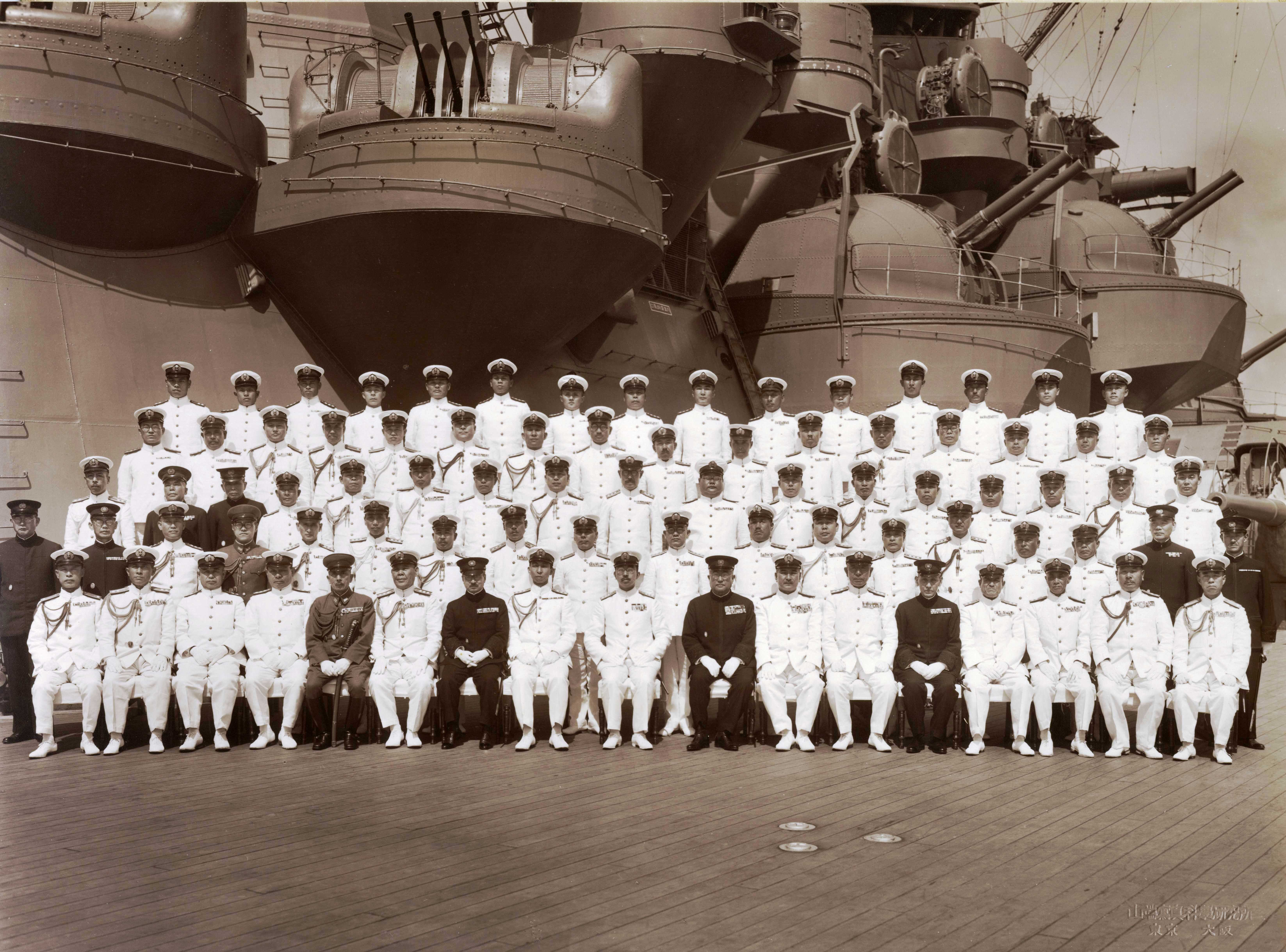
Emperor Hirohito and his staff on board Musashi, 24 June 1943. Visible in the background are two pairs of twin 127 mm (5 in) DP guns and a triple 25 mm (1 in) AA gun.

The ship remained in Truk Lagoon until 10 February 1944, when she returned to Yokosuka. On 24 February, Musashi sailed for Palau, carrying one Imperial Japanese Army battalion and another of Special Naval Landing Forces and their equipment. After losing most of her deck cargo in a typhoon, she arrived at Palau on 29 February and remained there for the next month. On 29 March, Musashi departed Palau under cover of darkness to avoid an expected air raid, and encountered the submarine USS Tunny, which fired six torpedoes at the battleship; five of them missed, but the sixth blew a hole 5.8 metres (19 ft) in diameter near the bow, flooding her with 3,000 tonnes of water. The torpedo hit killed seven crewmen and wounded another eleven. After temporary repairs, Musashi sailed for Japan later that night and arrived at Kure Naval Arsenal on 3 April. From 10 to 22 April, she was repaired, while her anti-aircraft armament was substantially increased in the space freed up by removal of the beam-mounted 155-millimetre (6.1 in) triple turrets. When she undocked on 22 April, the ship's secondary battery comprised six 15.5 cm guns, twenty-four 12.7 cm guns, one hundred and thirty 25 mm guns, and four 13.2 mm machine guns. She also received new radars (which were still primitive compared to American equipment) and depth-charge rails on her fantail.

In May 1944, Asakura was promoted to rear admiral; Musashi departed Kure for Okinawa on 10 May, then for Tawi-Tawi on 12 May. She was assigned to the 1st Mobile Fleet, under the command of Vice Admiral Jisaburō Ozawa, with her sister ship. On 10 June, the battleships departed Tawi-Tawi for Batjan under the command of Vice Admiral Matome Ugaki, in preparation for Operation Kon, a planned counterattack against the American invasion of Biak. Two days later, when word reached Ugaki of American attacks on Saipan, his force was diverted to the Mariana Islands. After they rendezvoused with Ozawa's main force on 16 June, the battleships were assigned to Vice Admiral Takeo Kurita's 2nd Fleet. During the Battle of the Philippine Sea, Musashi was not attacked. Following Japan's disastrous defeat in the battle (also known as the "Great Marianas Turkey Shoot"), the Second Fleet returned to Japan. On 8 July, Musashi and her sister embarked 3,522 men and equipment of the Army's 106th Infantry Regiment of the 49th Infantry Division and sailed for Lingga Island, where they arrived on 17 July.

=== Battle of Leyte Gulf ===
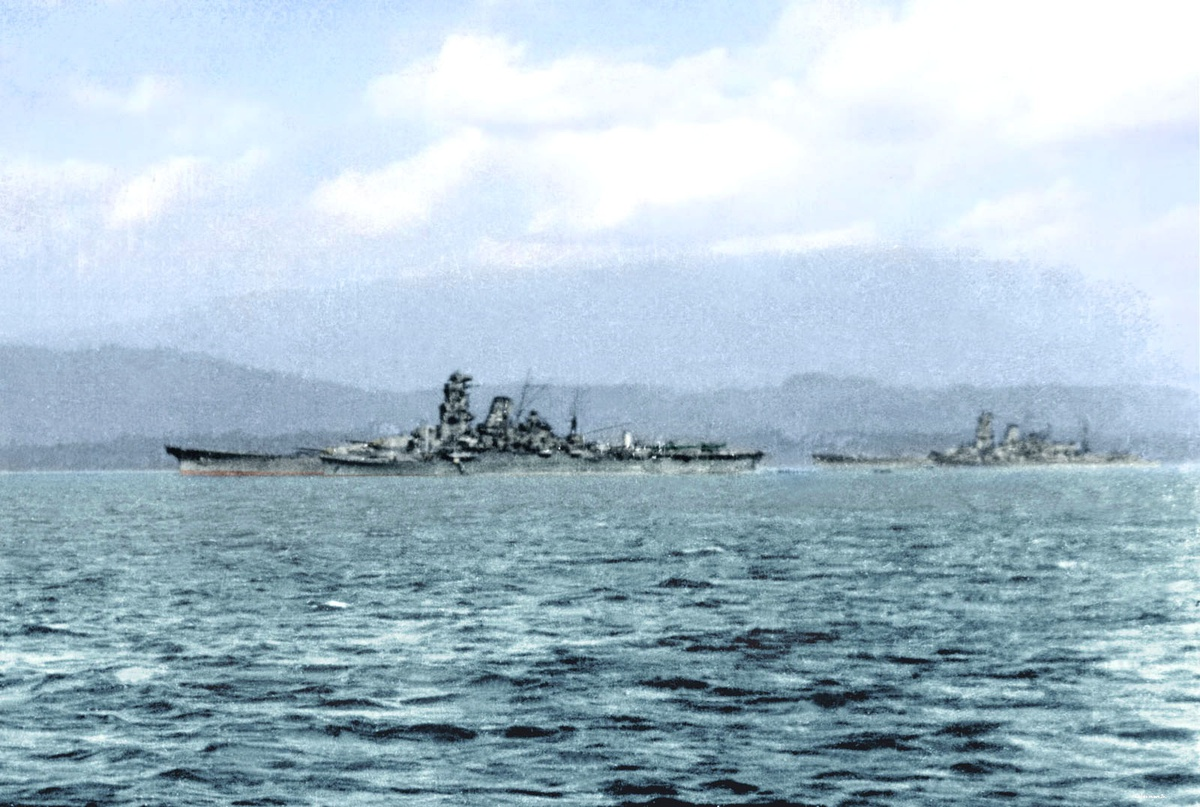
Musashi (right) and Yamato anchored in Brunei shortly before the battle of Leyte Gulf, 21 October 1944

Captain Toshihira Inoguchi relieved Asakura in command of Musashi on 12 August 1944 and was promoted to rear admiral on 15 October. Three days later, the ship sailed for Brunei Bay, Borneo to join the main Japanese fleet in preparation for "Operation Sho-1", the planned counterattack against the American landings at Leyte. The Japanese plan called for Ozawa's carrier forces to lure the American carrier fleets north of Leyte so that Kurita's 1st Diversion Force (also known as the Central Force) could enter Leyte Gulf and destroy American forces landing on the island. Musashi, together with the rest of Kurita's force, departed Brunei for the Philippines on 22 October.

The following day, the submarine USS Dace torpedoed and sank the heavy cruiser Maya near Palawan. The destroyer Akishimo rescued 769 survivors and transferred them to Musashi later in the day.

==== Loss at Sibuyan Sea ====
On 24 October, while transiting the Sibuyan Sea, Kurita's ships were spotted by a reconnaissance aircraft from the fleet carrier USS Intrepid. Just over two hours later, the battleship was attacked by eight Curtiss SB2C Helldiver dive bombers from Intrepid at 10:27. One 230-kilogram (500 lb) bomb struck the roof of Turret No. 1, failing to penetrate. Two minutes later, Musashi was struck starboard amidships by a torpedo from a Grumman TBF Avenger, also from Intrepid. The ship took on 3,000 tonnes of water and a 5.5-degree list to starboard that was later reduced to 1 degree by counterflooding compartments on the opposite side. During this attack, two Avengers were shot down.

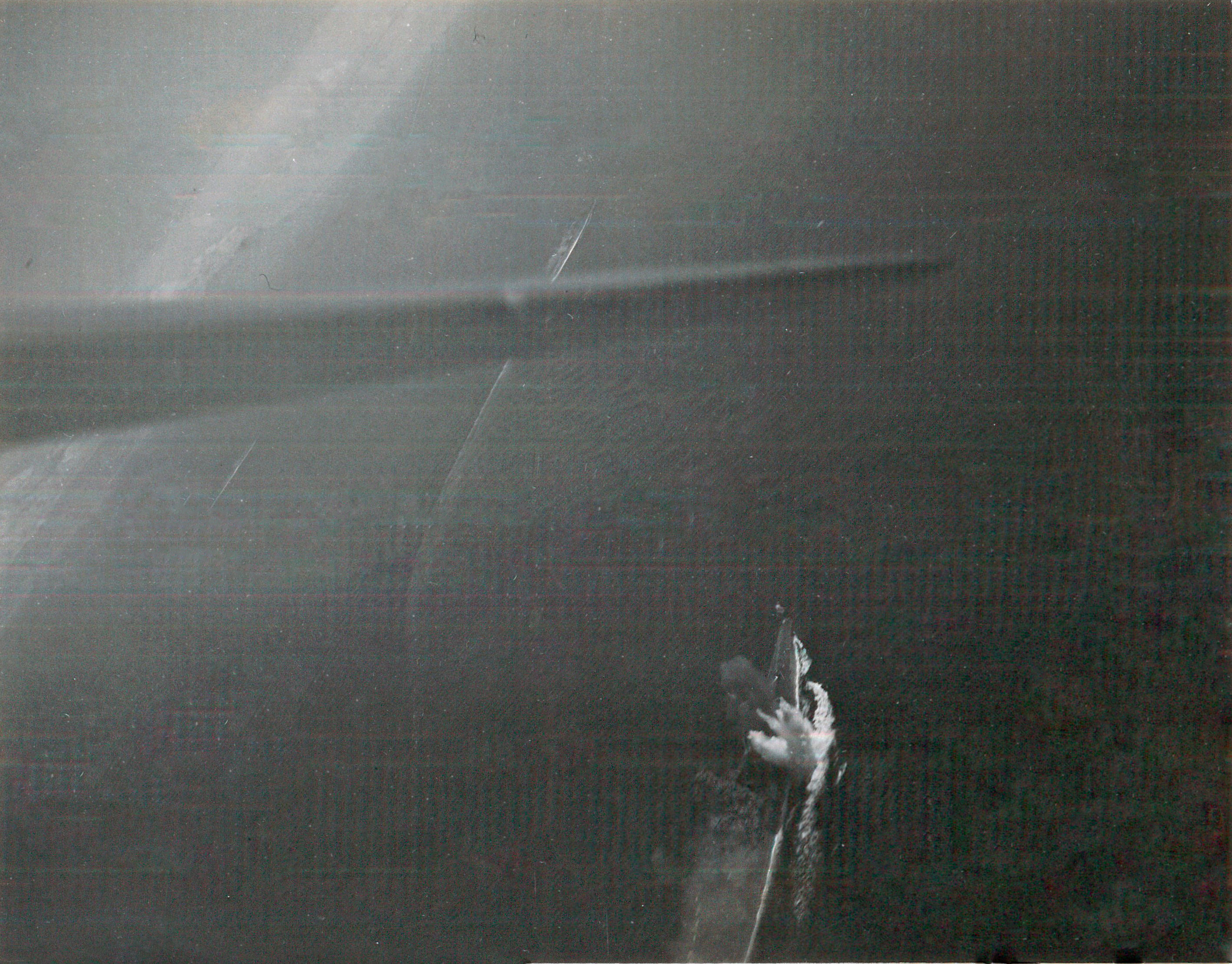
Musashi taking a torpedo hit early into the battle, 24 October 1944

An hour and a half later, another eight Helldivers from Intrepid attacked Musashi again. One bomb hit the upper deck and failed to detonate; another hit the port side of the deck and penetrated two upper decks before exploding above one of the engine rooms. Fragments broke a steam pipe in the engine room and forced its abandonment, as well as that of the adjacent boiler room. Power was lost to the port inboard propeller shaft and the ship's speed dropped to 22 knots (41 km/h; 25 mph). Anti-aircraft fire shot down two Helldivers during this attack. Three minutes later, nine Avengers attacked from both sides of the ship, scoring three torpedo hits on the port side. One hit abreast Turret No. 1, the second flooded a hydraulic machinery room, forcing the main turrets to switch over to auxiliary hydraulic pumps, and the third flooded another engine room. More counterflooding reduced the list to one degree to port, but the amount of flooding reduced the ship's forward freeboard by 1.8 metres (6 ft). During this attack, Musashi fired sanshikidan anti-aircraft shells from her main armament; one shell detonated in the middle gun of Turret No. 1, possibly because of a bomb fragment in the barrel, and wrecked the turret's elevating machinery.

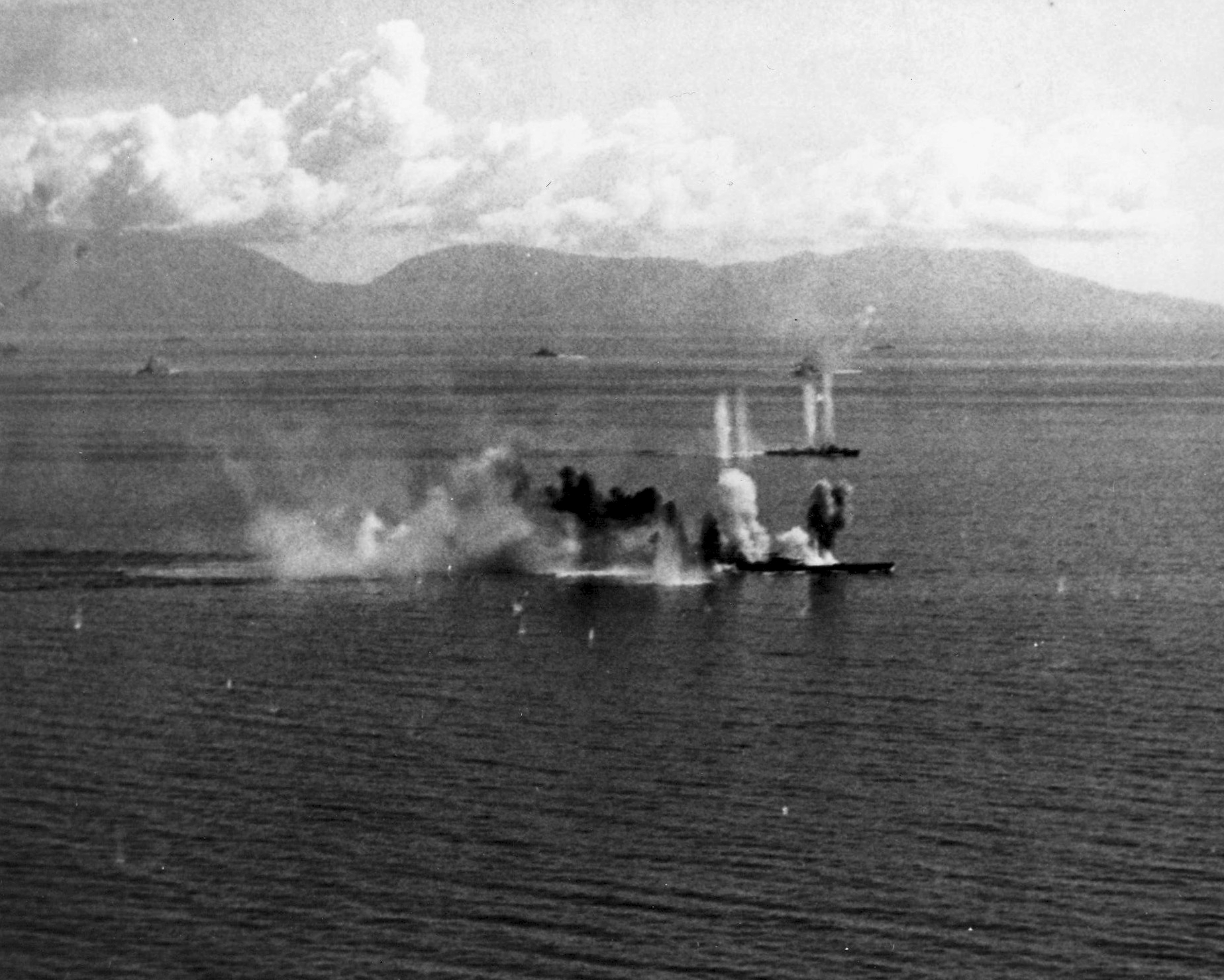
Musashi heavily damaged and still under attack; her draft has noticeably risen nearly to the deck. The destroyer Kiyoshimo is seen being strafed behind her.

At 13:31, the ship was attacked by 29 aircraft from fleet carriers Essex and Lexington. Two Grumman F6F Hellcat fighters strafed the ship's deck and Helldivers scored four more bomb hits near her forward turrets. Musashi was hit by four more torpedoes, three of which were forward of Turret No. 1, causing extensive flooding. The ship was now listing one degree to starboard, and had taken on so much water that her bow was now down 4 metres (13 ft) and her speed had been reduced to 20 knots (37 km/h; 23 mph). Two hours later, nine Helldivers from Enterprise attacked with 450-kilogram (1,000 lb) armour-piercing bombs and scored four hits which killed the entire forward damage control team, before another wave of Enterprise aircraft hit Musashi with three more torpedoes, opening up her starboard bow and reducing her speed to 13 knots (24 km/h; 15 mph). At 15:25, Musashi was attacked by 37 aircraft from Intrepid, the fleet carrier Franklin and the light carrier Cabot. The ship was hit by 13 bombs and 11 more torpedoes during this attack, for a loss of three Avengers and three Helldivers. Her speed was reduced to 6 knots (11 km/h; 6.9 mph), her main steering engine was temporarily knocked out and her rudder was briefly jammed 15 degrees to port. Counterflooding reduced her list to six degrees to port from its previous maximum of ten degrees. Musashi had been struck by an estimated total of 19 torpedoes and 17 bombs. (Note: The exact tally of hits is not precisely known; most Japanese sources report 11 torpedo and 10 bomb hits, Garzke & Dulin report 20 torpedo and 17 bomb hits, and analysis by the US Naval Technical Mission to Japan reports 10 torpedo and 16 bomb hits.)

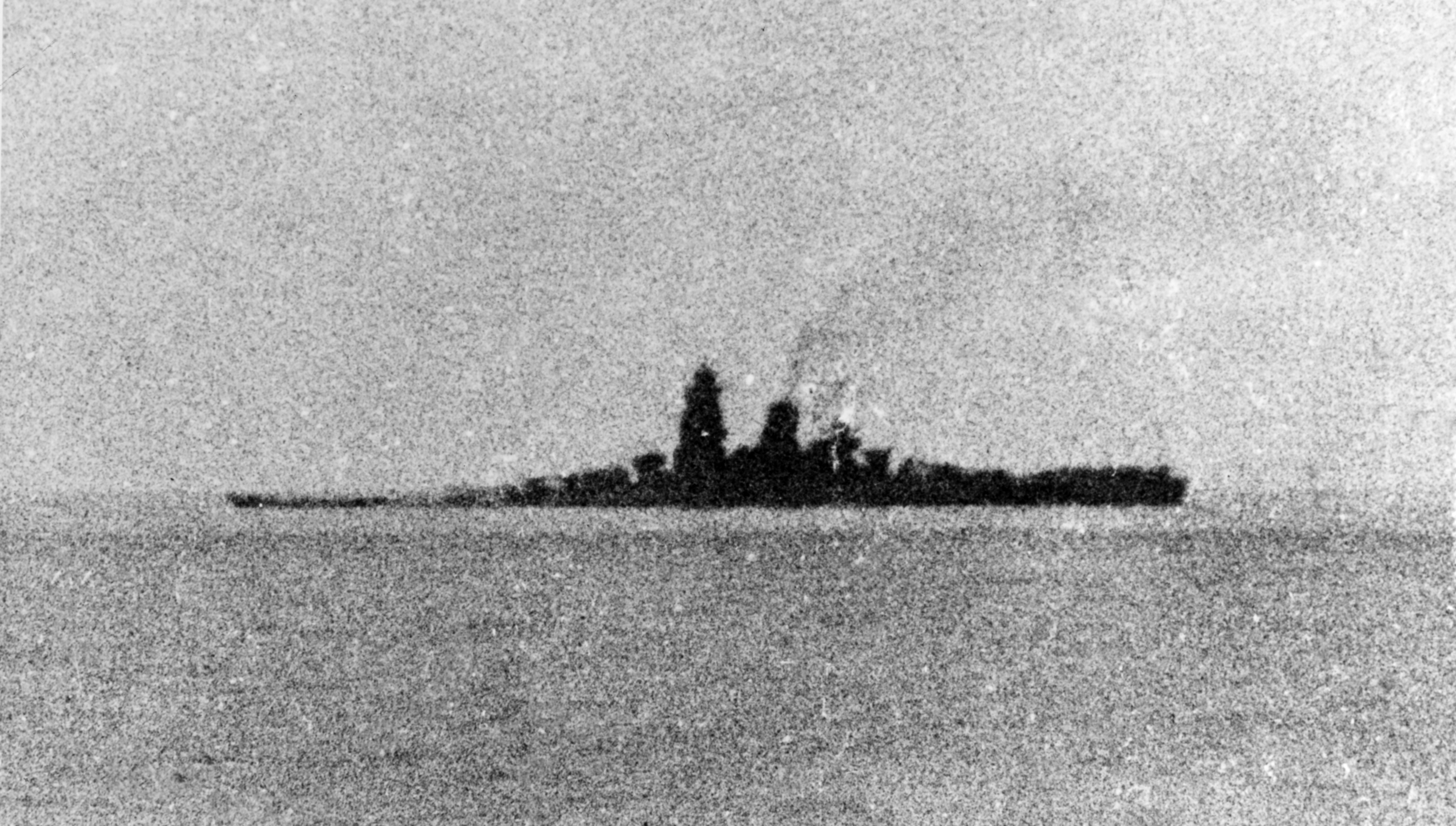
Musashi down by the bow after the air attacks, shortly before her sinking

Kurita left Musashi to fend for herself at 15:30, and encountered her again at 16:21 after reversing course. The ship was headed north, with a list of 10 degrees to port, down 8 metres (26 ft) at the bow with her forecastle awash. He detailed a heavy cruiser and two destroyers to escort her while frantic efforts were made to correct her list, including flooding another engine room and some boiler rooms. Her engines stopped before she could be beached. At 19:15, her list reached 12 degrees and her crew was ordered to prepare to abandon ship, which they did fifteen minutes later when the list reached 30 degrees. Musashi capsized at 19:36 and sank in 1,350 metres (4,430 ft) of water at 13°07′N 122°32′E. (Note: Jentschura, Jung & Michel give a different location of 12°50′N 122°35′E.) Inoguchi chose to go down with his ship; 1,376 of her 2,399-man crew were rescued by the destroyers Kiyoshimo and Hamakaze. About half of her survivors were evacuated to Japan, and the rest took part in the defence of the Philippines. The destroyer Shimakaze rescued 635 of Maya's survivors from Musashi.

== Wreck ==
=== Discovery ===
For over 70 years after her sinking, various attempts were made by shipwreck hunters to locate the wreck of the Japanese battleship, but none succeeded. Musashi, like other Japanese warships, did not have its name on its sides, making it more difficult for divers and shipwreck hunters to find her. A research team sponsored by Microsoft co-founder Paul Allen eventually found her after eight years of searching for the wreck, going through various historical records in different countries, and deploying the high-tech yacht Octopus and a remotely operated vehicle to aid in their search. In March 2015, Allen announced that the team had found Musashi under the Sibuyan Sea, some 900 metres (3,000 ft) beneath the surface.

The ship had been thought to have sunk in one piece; in reality, it exploded underwater, scattering debris across the ocean floor. The bow section from the number one barbette forward is upright on the sea floor, while the stern is upside down. The forward superstructure and funnel is detached from the rest of the ship and lies on its port side. In the live streaming video tour conducted by the expedition team, a mount for the seal of the Imperial Japanese Navy—a chrysanthemum made out of teak, long rotted away—can be seen amid the debris. The video also showed damage made by U.S. torpedoes, including a warped bow and hits under the ship's main gun. Other items found in the area of the wreck, as well as other features found inside, led maritime experts to claim with 90% certainty that the wreck was Musashi.

To further confirm the identity of the wreck, Shigeru Nakajima, an electrical technician on Musashi who survived by jumping overboard after the order to abandon ship was given, told the Associated Press that he was "certain" that the wreck was Musashi upon seeing its anchor and the imperial seal mount. He also expressed his gratitude to the expedition team for having located the shipwreck.

=== Preservation and protection ===
The discovery of the wreck beneath the surface of the Sibuyan Sea raised issues in the Philippines because the provincial government of Romblon, which has jurisdiction over the shipwreck site, and the Philippine Coast Guard were unaware that Allen and his team had an ongoing expedition in the area, though Governor Eduardo Firmalo publicly welcomed discovery of the ship. In response to the find, the Philippine Coast Guard stated that foreign-owned vessels need clearance from the Philippine Foreign Affairs Department, the Customs Bureau, and the Immigration Bureau before entering Philippine waters.

Although discovering the shipwreck was very important to the Japanese people because of the presence aboard of over 1,000 Japanese sailors' remains, the National Museum of the Philippines stated that "any further activity [pertaining to the shipwreck would] be governed by established rules and regulations." The Museum pointed out that the wreck site of Musashi, as stated by the law, is considered an archaeological site under Romblon's jurisdiction, and was "giving priority to verifying the discovery, obtaining and sharing key information, facilitating the protection and preservation of the site, and formulating appropriate next steps."

== Sources ==
- Garzke, William H. & Dulin, Robert O. (1985). Battleships: Axis and Neutral Battleships in World War II. Annapolis, Maryland: Naval Institute Press. ISBN 978-0-87021-101-0.
- Hackett, Bob & Kingsepp, Sander (2012). "IJN Battleship Musashi: Tabular Record of Movement". Combinedfleet.com.
- Holtzworth, E.C. (January 1946). "Reports of the US Naval Technical Mission to Japan: Ship and Related Targets – Article 2: Yamato (BB), Musashi (BB), Taiho (CV), Shinano (CV)" (PDF). United States Navy. Archived from the original (PDF) on 18 October 2013.
- Jentschura, Hansgeorg; Jung, Dieter & Mickel, Peter (1977). Warships of the Imperial Japanese Navy, 1869–1945. Annapolis, Maryland: United States Naval Institute. ISBN 0-87021-893-X.
- Lacroix, Eric & Wells, Linton (1997). Japanese Cruisers of the Pacific War. Annapolis, Maryland: Naval Institute Press. ISBN 0-87021-311-3.
- Padfield, Peter (2000). Battleship. Edinburgh: Birlinn. ISBN 1-84158-080-5.
- Polmar, Norman & Genda, Minoru (2006). Aircraft Carriers: A History of Carrier Aviation and Its Influence on World Events. Vol. 1, 1909–1945. Washington, D.C.: Potomac Books. ISBN 1-57488-663-0.
- Silverstone, Paul H. (1984). Directory of the World's Capital Ships. New York: Hippocrene Books. ISBN 0-88254-979-0.
- Skulski, Janusz (1995) [1988]. The Battleship Yamato. Anatomy of the Ship. London: Conway Maritime Press. ISBN 0-85177-490-3.
- Stille, Mark (2008). Imperial Japanese Navy Battleships 1941–45. New Vanguard. Vol. 146. Botley, UK: Osprey Publishing. ISBN 978-1-84603-280-6.
- Sturton, Ian (1980). "Japan". In Chesneau, Roger (ed.). Conway's All the World's Fighting Ships 1922–1946. Greenwich, UK: Conway Maritime Press. ISBN 0-85177-146-7.
- Thorne, Phil (March 2022). "Battle of the Sibuyan Sea". Warship International. LIX (1): 34–65. ISSN 0043-0374.
- Whitley, M. J. (1998). Battleships of World War Two: An International Encyclopedia. Annapolis, Maryland: Naval Institute Press. ISBN 1-55750-184-X.
- Yoshimura, Akira (1999). Battleship Musashi: The Making and Sinking of the World's Greatest Battleship. Tokyo: Kodansha International. ISBN 4-7700-2400-2.
