= Kaoru Arima =

Imperial Japanese Navy vice admiral (1893–1956)

- 有馬 馨
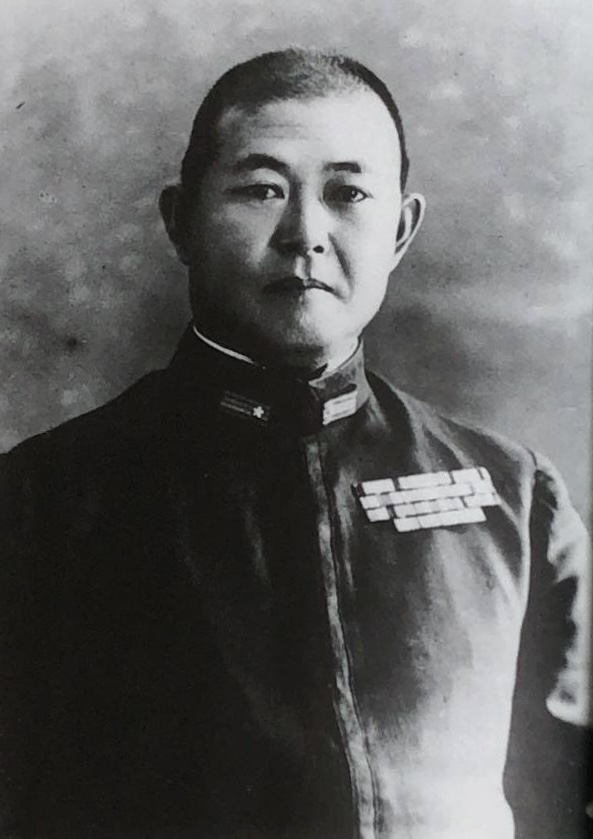
- Born: 15 December 1893; Miyazaki, Japan
- Died: 23 January 1956 (aged 62)
- Education: Imperial Japanese Naval Academy; Naval Staff College
- Military career
- Allegiance: Empire of Japan
- Branch: Imperial Japanese Navy
- Service years: 1914–1945
- Rank: Vice admiral
- Units: Aso, Hizen, Izumo, Oboro, Minazuki, Kuma, Asama, Kongō, Yakumo, 2nd Expeditionary Fleet, Imperial Japanese Navy General Staff, IJN 4th Fleet
- Commands: Kumano, Hiei, Musashi, Kure Local Submarine Squadron, 2nd Maritime Escort Group, 4th Base Force, 31st Special Base Force
- Conflicts: World War II; Pacific War
- Other work: Instructor

Signature
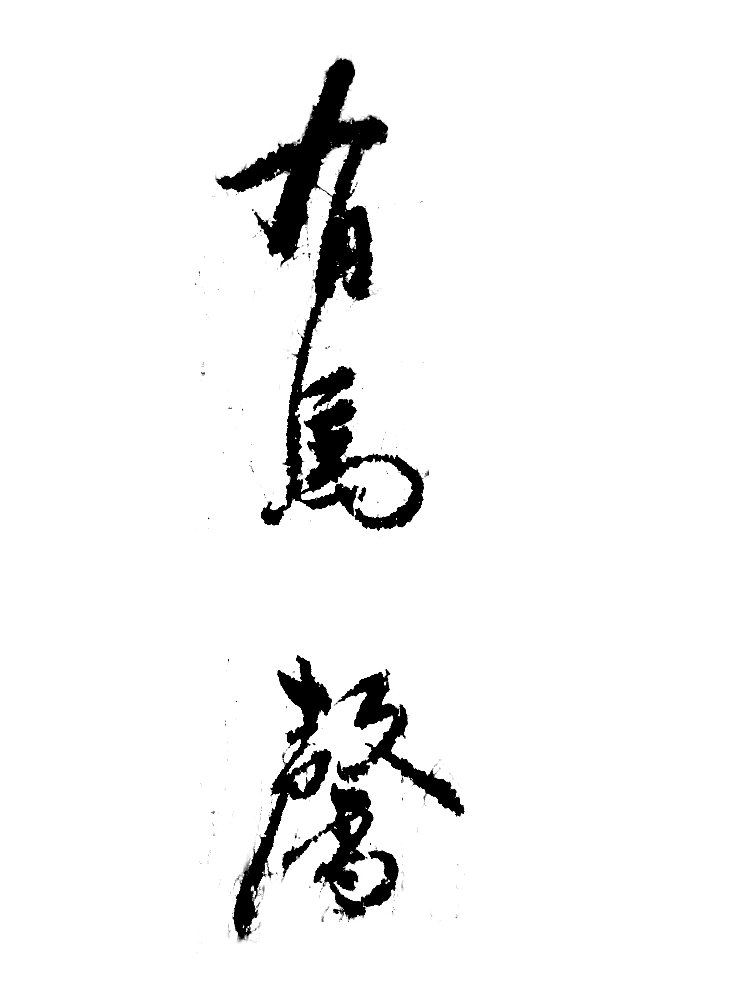

Kaoru Arima (有馬 馨, Arima Kaoru; 15 December 1893 – 23 January 1956) was a vice admiral in the Imperial Japanese Navy during World War II. Early in the Pacific War he commanded the battleship Musashi, one of the largest battleships ever built.

== Biography ==
Arima was a native of Miyazaki prefecture. He graduated from the 42nd class of the Imperial Japanese Naval Academy in 1914, ranking 40th out of 117 cadets. As a midshipman, he was assigned to the cruiser Aso and battleship Hizen, and as a sub-lieutenant to the cruiser Izumo. After serving on the crew of the destroyers Oboro and Minazuki, he was commissioned as a lieutenant and assigned to the cruiser Kuma, followed by the cruiser Asama and the battleship Kongō.

Arima graduated from the 25th class of the Naval Staff College and was promoted to lieutenant commander in December 1926. After a 2½-year stint as a gunnery instructor at the Imperial Japanese Naval Academy, he subsequently served as chief gunnery officer on the cruiser Yakumo. He was assigned to the staff of the 2nd Expeditionary Fleet in China in September 1931, and made the jump to the Imperial Japanese Navy General Staff in November 1932. After his promotion to commander in December 1932, he served as an instructor at the Naval Staff College through 1937.

Arima was also promoted to captain in December 1936, and received his first command, the cruiser Kumano in November 1939. In October 1940, he was assigned command of the battleship Hiei. From September 1941, he was executive officer on the new super-battleship Musashi, and became its captain on 5 August 1942. He was promoted to rear admiral on 1 November. For most of the remainder of the war, he served as an instructor at the naval academy and specialized training schools.

Later, Arima served as chief of staff for the IJN's IJN 4th Fleet; he was promoted to vice admiral on 1 November 1945. Surviving the war, Arima died on 23 January 1956.
