= Design A-150 battleship =

Planned class of Japanese super battleships

- Artist's impression of an A-150-class battleship

Class overview
- Name: A-150
- Builders: Yokosuka Naval Arsenal; Kure Naval Arsenal
- Operators: Imperial Japanese Navy
- Preceded by: Yamato class
- Succeeded by: None
- Planned: 2
- Completed: 0
- Canceled: 2

General characteristics
- Type: Battleship
- Displacement: Approximately 70,000 long tons (71,000 t)
- Length: 263 m (862 ft 10 in) (est.)
- Beam: 38.9 m (127 ft 7 in) (est.)
- Propulsion: Unknown
- Armament: 3 × twin 51 cm (20.1 in) guns; "Many" 10 cm (3.9 in) dual-purpose guns
- Armor: Possibly a 45.7 cm (18 in) side belt; Turret: 80 cm (31 in) (face); 29.5 cm (11.6 in) (roof)

Design A-150, (Note: In Japanese, the name for this planned ship class is Chō Yamato-gata senkan (超大和型戦艦). These ships were never given formal names.) popularly known as the Super Yamato class, (Note: Although called the "Super Yamato class" by some historians, Design A-150 was entirely new, having little in common with the earlier Yamato-class battleships.) was a planned class of battleships for the Imperial Japanese Navy. In keeping with longstanding Japanese naval strategy, the A-150s would have carried six 51-centimeter (20.1 in) guns to ensure their qualitative superiority over any other battleship they might face. Had these ships been built, they would have carried the largest guns ever mounted on a capital ship.

Design work on the A-150s began after the preceding Yamato class in 1938–1939 and was mostly finished by early 1941, when the Japanese began focusing on aircraft carriers and other smaller warships in preparation for the coming conflict. No A-150 would ever be laid down, and many details of the class' design were destroyed near the end of the war.

== Background and design ==
In the 1930s, the Japanese government began a shift towards an ultranationalist militancy. Planners envisioned an empire stretching from Japan to the resource-rich European colonies in Southeast Asia, and defensible islands in the Pacific Ocean (the Greater East Asia Co-Prosperity Sphere). The extensive distances involved, and the likelihood of this expansion leading to a confrontation with the United States, led the Japanese to build and maintain a large fleet that could seize and hold onto these territories. The U.S. posed a particular problem for Japan, as it possessed significantly greater industrial power, and several leading members of the United States Congress had pledged "to outbuild Japan three to one in a naval race".

The Imperial Japanese Navy had recognized since at least 1896 that the country could not outproduce its potential opponents, and therefore insisted that its ships had to be more powerful than foreign equivalents. It established this qualitative lead at various times over the next 40 years, with the Kongo-class battlecruisers just before World War I, the Nagato-class battleships at the end of that war, and the Yamato-class battleships in the 1930s. The A-150s were designed according to that doctrine to continue their qualitative superiority in battleships over their most likely opponents, the United States and United Kingdom.

Early conceptions for what would become the A-150 battleships called for eight or nine 51-centimeter guns in double or triple turrets, as the successful construction of a 48-centimeter (18.9 in) gun in 1920–1921 made the Japanese confident that such a large weapon could be built. The designers hoped to give the ships a top speed of 30 knots (56 km/h; 35 mph), which would give them a comfortable margin over the American 27-knot (50 km/h; 31 mph) North Carolina-class battleships. However, these grand specifications were curtailed when tests culminated in a ship that had a displacement of some 91,000 metric tons (90,000 long tons); it was felt that ships of this size would be "too large and too expensive".

Formal design studies began in 1938–1939. They initially focused on a ship closer to the displacement of the preceding Yamato class, on which plans had just been completed, albeit one mounting six 51-centimeter guns. As the Japanese expected that the Americans would ascertain the true characteristics of the Yamato class—especially its primary armament of 46-centimeter (18.1 in) guns, which would become the largest naval weapons in use in the world—they hoped that the 51-centimeter guns would outperform any American response to the Yamato's smaller guns.

== Specifications ==
Plans for the A-150s were finished in early 1941, for most intents and purposes. However, these were destroyed at the end of the war, along with most of the other documentation relating to the class. The general destruction of records and Japan's extensive efforts (before and during the war) to keep any information about the ships out of the hands of foreign nations severely limited the amount of information on the ships available to historians. For these reasons the A-150's exact specifications are uncertain. The displacement was to be similar to the Yamato class, which was around 70,000 metric tons (69,000 long tons), and the belt armor was probably going to be 45.7 centimeters (18 in) thick. This was so large that steel mills in Japan were incapable of manufacturing it. Instead, two layers of armor plates would have been used, despite its reduced effectiveness as compared to a single plate of the same total thickness. Similarly, the turret-face armor would have been 80 centimeters (31 in) thick in two layers. The roof armor would have consisted of a single plate 29.5 centimeters (11.6 in) thick.

=== Armament ===
The design of the A-150s called for a main battery of six 45-caliber 51-centimeter guns in three twin turrets. These would have been the largest ever fitted to a capital ship, dwarfing the 46-centimeter guns mounted on the Yamato class, and were a key factor in naval historians William H. Garzke and Robert O. Dulin's argument that the A-150s would have been the "most powerful battleships in history". Construction of two of the 51-centimeter guns was ordered in 1941 for trials at the Kure Naval Arsenal and detailed designs of their turrets were drawn up. The turrets would have weighed 2,780 metric tons (2,740 long tons) and each gun would have massed 227 metric tons (223 long tons). They would have had a total length of 23.56 meters (77 ft 4 in) and the bore length was to have been around 22.84 meters (74 ft 11 in). The armor-piercing shells would have weighed 1,950 kg (4,300 lb).

The composition of the A-150's secondary armament is not fully known. Historians Eric Lacroix and Linton Wells have written that Japanese designers were considering mounting a large number of 65-caliber 10-centimeter (3.9 in) Type 98 dual-purpose guns, though this was not final. These guns had a maximum elevation of +90°, which gave them an effective ceiling of 11,000 meters (12,030 yd) and a horizontal range of 14,000 meters (15,311 yd). They fired 13-kilogram (29 lb) projectiles at a muzzle velocity of 1,030 m/s (3,400 ft/s), although resulting wear on the barrels reduced their designed lifespan to only about 350 rounds. They were able to fire 15–19 rounds per minute.

== Construction ==
As war with the United States became increasingly likely over the Second Sino-Japanese War, and particularly after the Japanese seizure of French Indochina in mid-1940, all design work on battleships was diverted in early 1941—even though the A-150's design was nearly complete—in order to focus on higher-priority warships like aircraft carriers and cruisers. Two A-150s, provisionally designated as Warships Number 798 and 799, were projected in a 1942 building program. Under this plan, 798 would have been built in the same dock as Shinano, while 799 would be built in Kure in the same dock as Yamato after a fourth Yamato-class ship was launched. The ships would then have been finished in 1946–1947, but the war's turn against the Japanese after the Battle of Midway meant that the need for ships other than battleships never abated.

== Bibliography ==
- Breyer, Siegfried (1973). Battleships and Battle Cruisers, 1905–1970. Garden City, New York: Doubleday. OCLC 702840.
- Evans, David & Peattie, Mark R. (1997). Kaigun: Strategy, Tactics, and Technology in the Imperial Japanese Navy, 1887–1941. Annapolis, Maryland: Naval Institute Press. ISBN 0-87021-192-7.
- Garzke, William H. & Dulin, Robert O. (1985). Battleships: Axis and Neutral Battleships in World War II. Annapolis, Maryland: Naval Institute Press. ISBN 0-87021-101-3. OCLC 12613723.
- Lacroix, Eric & Wells, Linton (1997). Japanese Cruisers of the Pacific War. Annapolis, Maryland: Naval Institute Press. ISBN 0-87021-311-3.
- Lengerer, Hans & Ahlberg, Lars (2019). Battleship Tosa Demolition Tests to the Modified Yamato Class. Capital Ships of the Imperial Japanese Navy, 1868–1945. Vol. 3. Zagreb: Despot Infinitus. ISBN 978-953-8218-57-6.
- Muir, Malcolm (October 1990). "Rearming in a Vacuum: United States Navy Intelligence and the Japanese Capital Ship Threat, 1936–1945". The Journal of Military History. 54 (4). Society for Military History: 485. doi:10.2307/1986067. ISSN 1543-7795. JSTOR 1986067. OCLC 37032245.
- Schom, Alan (2004). The Eagle and the Rising Sun: The Japanese-American War, 1941–1943, Pearl Harbor through Guadalcanal. New York: W. W. Norton. ISBN 0-393-04924-8. OCLC 50737498.
- Skulski, Janusz (1989). The Battleship Yamato. Annapolis, Maryland: Naval Institute Press. ISBN 0-87021-019-X. OCLC 19299680.
- Sturton, Ian (1980). "Japan". In Chesneau, Roger (ed.). Conway's All the World's Fighting Ships 1922–1946. Greenwich, UK: Conway Maritime Press. ISBN 0-85177-146-7.
- Willmott, H.P. (1999). The Second World War in the Far East. London: Cassell. ISBN 0-3043-5247-0. OCLC 59378558.
