= Volcano and Ryukyu Islands campaign =

Campaign of the Pacific theater of WWII

- Part of the Pacific War and World War II
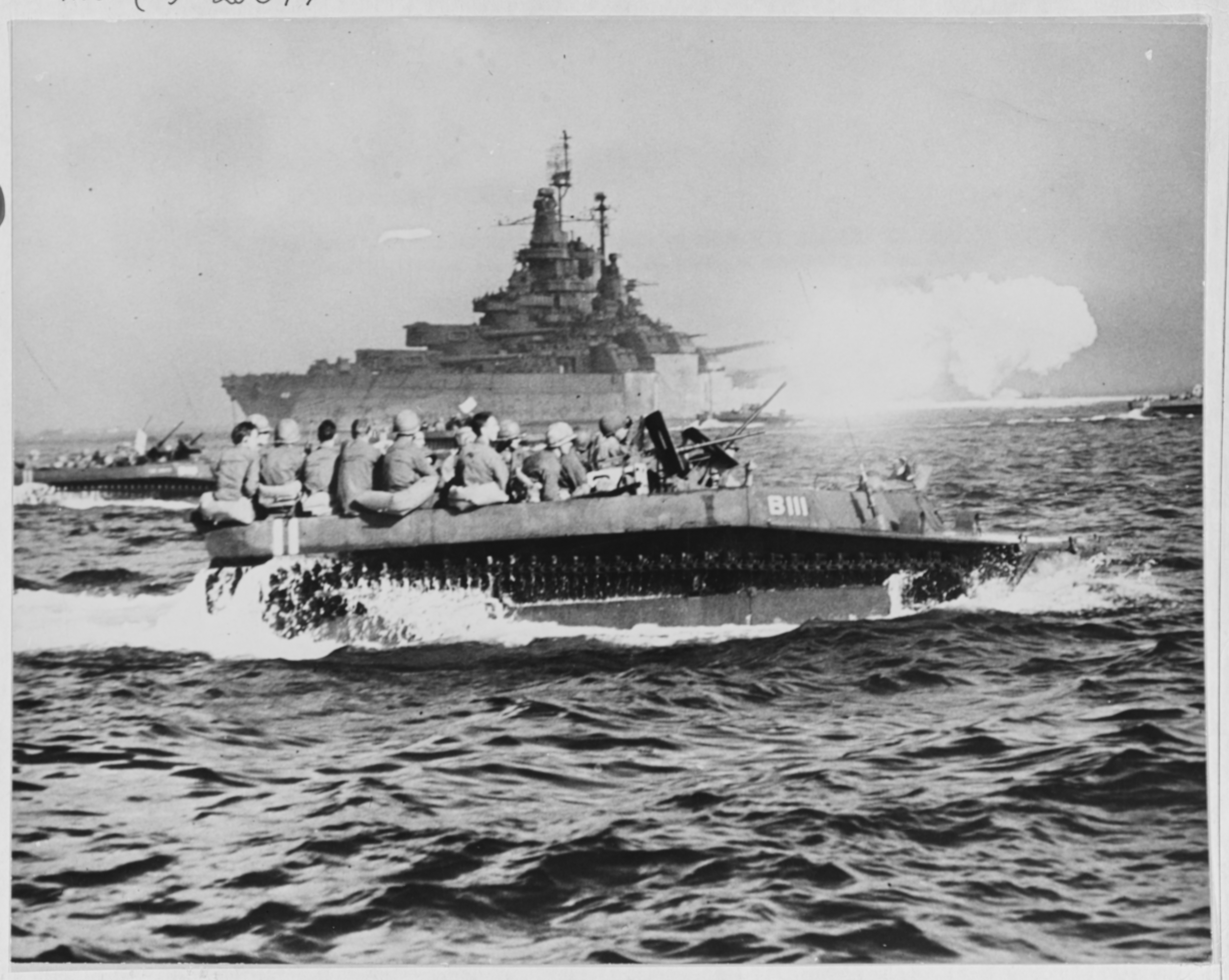
- USS Tennessee bombarding Okinawa with her 14-inch/50-caliber main battery guns, as the Landing Vehicle Tracked in the foreground carries troops to the invasion beaches.
Date	19 February – 21 June 1945
Location	Volcano Islands and Ryukyu Islands, Pacific Ocean
Result	Allied victory

Belligerents
United States; United Kingdom	Japan

Commanders and leaders
COMPACFLT: (United States) Chester W. Nimitz; US Navy: (United States) Raymond A. Spruance; (United States) Marc A. Mitscher; (United States) William Halsey, Jr.; Royal Navy: (United Kingdom) Bernard Rawlings; (United Kingdom) Sir Philip Vian; (United Kingdom) Bruce Fraser; US Marine Corps: (United States) Holland Smith; (United States) Roy Geiger; US Army: (United States) Simon B. Buckner †; (United States) Joseph W. Stilwell	Western District Army: (Empire of Japan) Isamu Yokoyama; Imperial Japanese Navy: (Empire of Japan) Seiichi Itō †; (Empire of Japan) Minoru Ōta ‡‡; (Empire of Japan) Kōsaku Aruga †; (Empire of Japan) Keizō Komura; Japanese Army: (Empire of Japan) Tadamichi Kuribayashi (PKIA); (Empire of Japan) Mitsuru Ushijima ‡‡; (Empire of Japan) Isamu Chō ‡‡; (Empire of Japan) Hiromichi Yahara (POW)

Casualties and losses
27,113 dead or missing, 74,501 wounded, 79 ships sunk and scrapped, 773 aircraft destroyed Casualties from Battle of Iwo Jima and the Battle of Okinawa	98,811–128,375 dead or missing, 17,000 wounded, 7,216 captured, 21 ships sunk and scrapped, 3,130 aircraft destroyed, 75,000–140,000 civilians dead or missing Casualties from Battle of Iwo Jima and the Battle of Okinawa

The Volcano and Ryūkyū Islands campaign was a series of battles and engagements between Allied forces and Imperial Japanese Forces in the Pacific Ocean campaign of World War II between January and June 1945.

The campaign took place in the Volcano and Ryukyu island groups. The two main land battles in the campaign were the Battle of Iwo Jima (16 February to 26 March 1945) and the Battle of Okinawa (1 April to 21 June 1945). One major naval battle occurred, called Operation Ten-Go (7 April 1945) after the operational title given to it by the Japanese.

The campaign was part of the Allied Japan campaign intended to provide staging areas for an invasion of Japan as well as supporting aerial bombardment and a naval blockade of the Japanese mainland. The dropping of atomic weapons on two Japanese cities and the Soviet invasion of Japanese Manchuria, however, caused the Japanese government to surrender without an armed invasion being necessary.

== Engagements ==
=== Iwo Jima ===
Iwo Jima's strategic importance was debatable. The Allies considered the island to be an important staging area for future invasion forces, however, after the Allies captured Iwo Jima, their focus shifted from using the island as a staging area to employing the island as a base for fighter escorts and the B-29 Superfortress bombers recovery. The Japanese had a radar station and airstrips to launch fighters that would pick off B-29s raiding the Japanese home islands. If captured by the Americans, it could provide them with bases for fighter escorts to assist B-29s in raiding the Japanese home islands, as well as being an emergency landing strip for any damaged B-29s that could not return to the Marianas.

The operation to take Iwo Jima was authorized in October 1944. On 19 February 1945 the campaign for Iwo Jima was launched. The island was secure by 26 March. Only a few Japanese were captured, as the rest were killed or committed suicide as defeat befell them. However, the Americans suffered a heavy toll in casualties in their initial landing, as opposed to the main fighting. Fighters began operations from 11 March, when the airfields were secured, and the first bombers hit the home islands.

=== Okinawa ===
Okinawa was right at Japan's doorstep, providing the springboard for the Allies to invade the Japanese mainland. Meanwhile, on Okinawa 131,000 Japanese soldiers dug in away from the landing beaches in the southern half of the island, as opposed to attempting to stop the landing at the beaches in earlier battles. General Mitsuru Ushijima made sure that the Americans would not even come close to the beaches, using kamikazes under Soemu Toyoda to stem the tide. The suicide bombers proved effective, sinking 34 ships and damaging hundreds of others, but they nevertheless failed to stop American reinforcements from arriving on the island. On 7 April the large Japanese battleship Yamato was sent out to use a kamikaze method, codenamed Ten-Go, but it was sunk before it could attack the invasion fleet. Vice Admiral Seiichi Ito and the commander of the battleship, Kosaku Aruga, were killed in the fatal mission, and the battleship was destroyed before it could engage the US Navy.

On the land campaign, 48,193 military personnel were killed, wounded, or missing to secure the island. By the end of the battle, three-quarters of the Japanese officers were killed or had killed themselves. Only a handful of officers survived the battle, although more soldiers capitulated. Control of the Volcano and Ryukyu Islands helped the US Army Air Forces conduct missions against targets on Honshu and Kyushu, with the first raid occurring on Tokyo from 9 and 10 March.

=== Air campaign ===
After the capture of the Mariana Islands in 1944, US land-based and carrier-borne aircraft struck the Volcano and Bonin Islands. Haha-Jima and Chichi-Jima in the Bonin Islands and Iwo Jima in the Volcano Islands in particular were attacked by US aircraft.

Beginning in late 1944, the United States Navy’s and Royal Navy's carrier-based aircraft attacked Japanese military forces on the Ryukyu Islands. This included the islands of Amami, Tanega, Yaku, Kikai, Miyako, Tokuno, Ishigaki, and Daito islands which held Japanese military and civilian infrastructure that had to be neutralized for Allied troops operating around Okinawa. Kamikaze bases in the Ryukyu Islands posed a particular threat to the U.S. and British task force operating around Okinawa and its environs. Allied air attacks continued until August 1945. The aerial bombardment intensified further after the invasion of Okinawa. Thousands of Japanese aircraft and dozens of merchant ships were destroyed, with a consequent heavy loss of both civilian and military lives.

== See also ==
- Japan campaign
- Japanese air attacks on the Mariana Islands

== Notes and references ==
- Drea, Edward J. (1998). "An Allied Interpretation of the Pacific War". In the Service of the Emperor: Essays on the Imperial Japanese Army. Nebraska: University of Nebraska Press. ISBN 0-8032-1708-0.
- Dyer, George Carroll. "The Amphibians Came to Conquer: The Story of Admiral Richmond Kelly Turner". United States Government Printing Office.
