= Yahagi =

Yahagi (矢作), a historical Japanese occupation equivalent to "fletcher", may refer to:

- Yahagi, a former village now part of Rikuzentakata, Iwate, Japan
- Yahagi Domain, Shimōsa Province, now in Chiba Prefecture, Japan
- Japanese ship Yahagi, several ships
- Rikuzen-Yahagi Station, Rikuzentakata, Iwate Prefecture, Japan
- Yahagi River, with its source in Nagano Prefecture, Japan
- 4941 Yahagi, an asteroid
- Yahagi (apple), a variety of apple

== People with the surname ==
- Honoka Yahagi (born 1997), Japanese actress, fashion model, and voice actress
- Kôsuke Yahagi, Japanese manga magazine editor; editor-in-chief of Jump Square
- Sayuri Yahagi (born 1986), Japanese voice actress
- Toshihiko Yahagi, Japanese novelist; winner of the 2004 Mishima Yukio Prize

== Fictional characters with the surname ==
- Shogo Yahagi, in Megazone 23
- Yoshimi Yahagi, in the novel Battle Royale

== See also ==
- Yahaghi (disambiguation)
- Kamiyahagi, Gifu, a former town, now part of the city of Ena, Japan
- Battle of Yahagi-gawa, 1181
