= Yamato (film) =

2005 Japanese film directed by Junya Satō

- Original film poster
- Directed by: Junya Satō
- Written by: Junya Satō; Jun Henmi (Novel)
- Produced by: Noriko Koyanagi; Haruki Kadokawa
- Starring: Takashi Sorimachi; Nakamura Shidō II; Yū Aoi; Kenichi Matsuyama; Junichi Haruta; Kyōka Suzuki; Eiji Okuda; Tetsuya Watari; Tatsuya Nakadai
- Cinematography: Yoshitaka Sakamoto
- Edited by: Takerō Yoneda
- Music by: Joe Hisaishi
- Distributed by: Toei Company
- Release date: 17 December 2005 (Japan)
- Running time: 145 minutes
- Country: Japan
- Language: Japanese
- Budget: ¥2.5 billion
- Box office: ¥5.11 billion

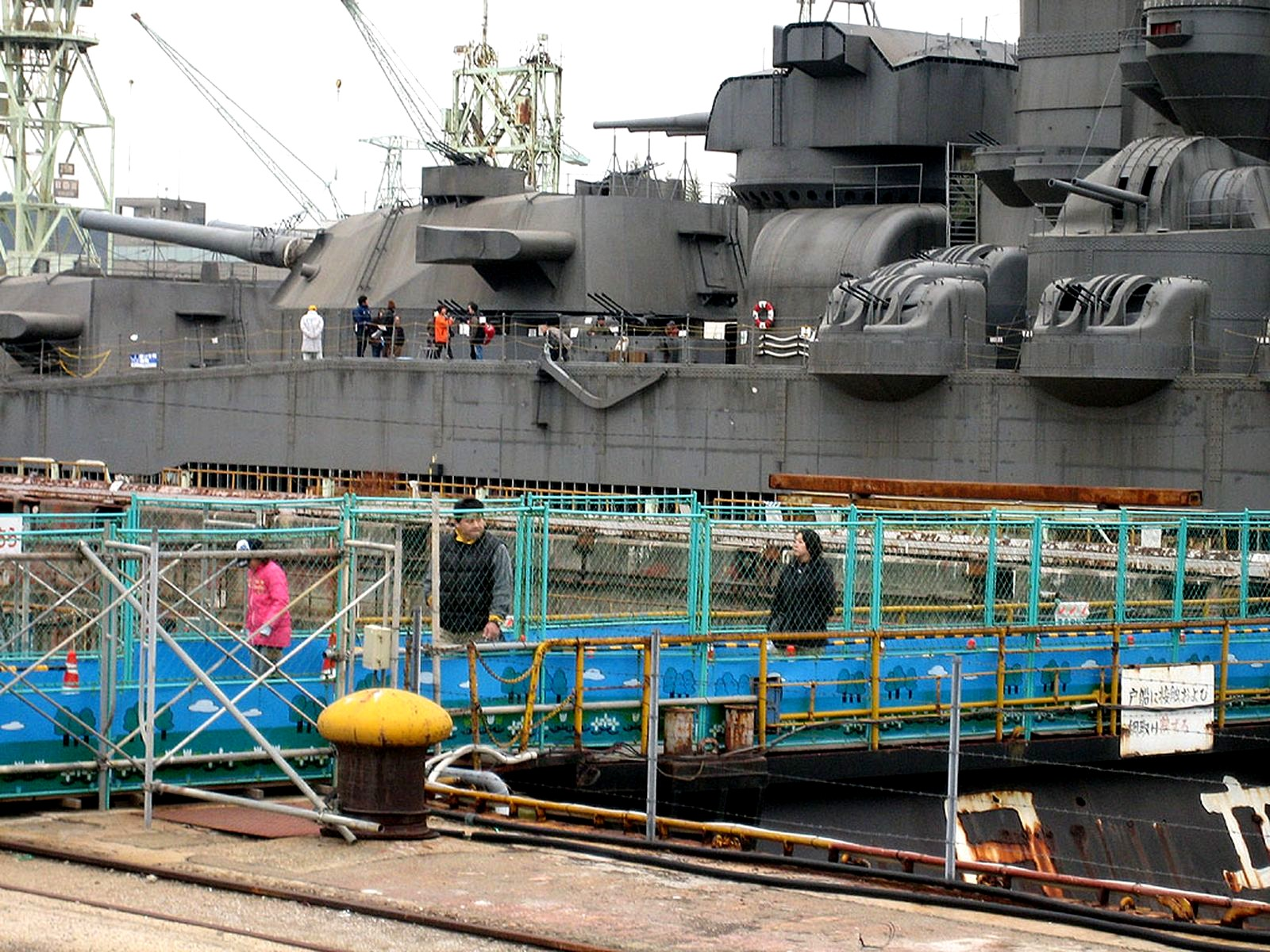
Film sets of Yamato

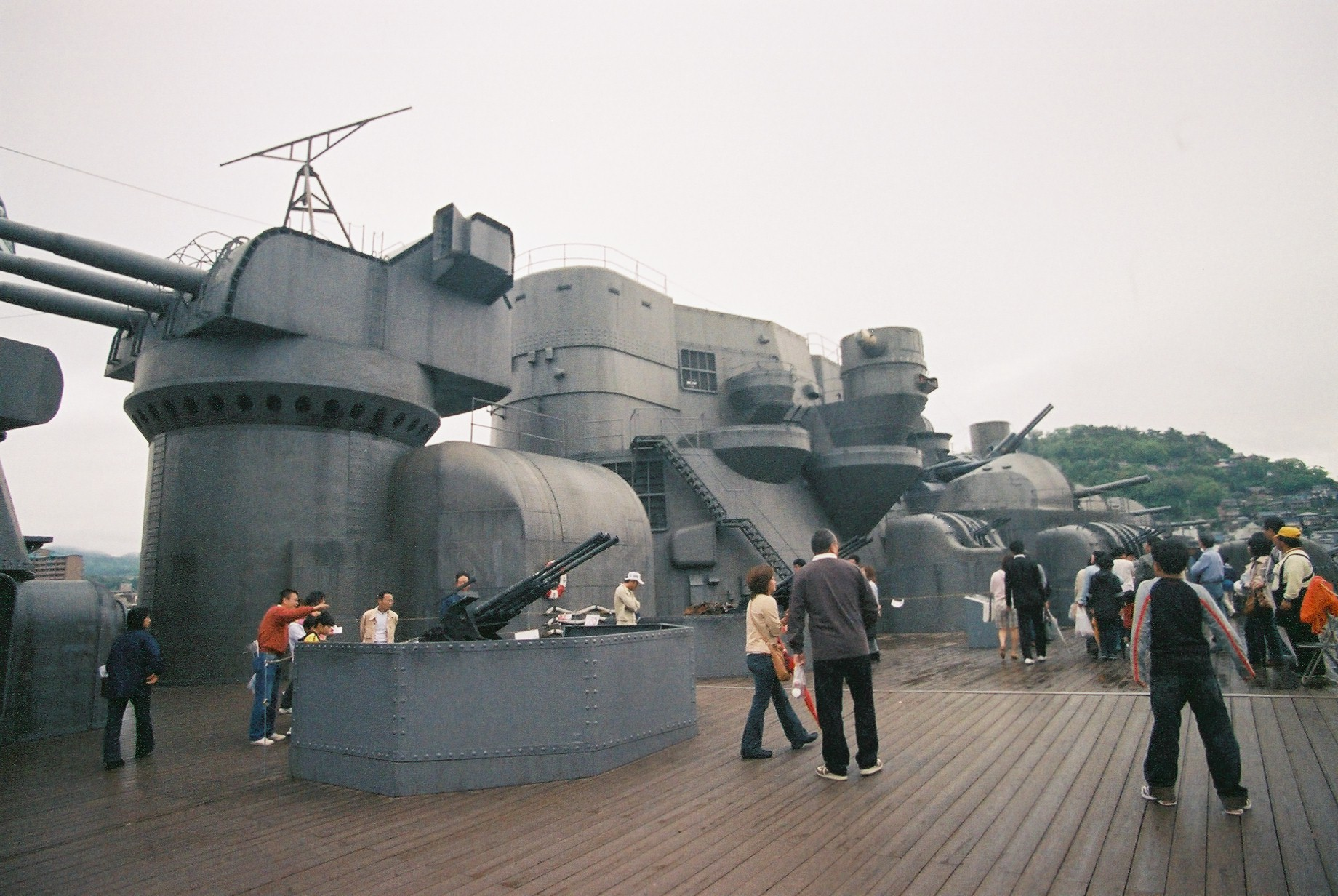
Film sets of Yamato

Yamato (Japanese: 男たちの大和, Hepburn: Otoko-tachi no Yamato; lit. "The Men's Yamato") is a 2005 Japanese war film. It was directed by Junya Satō and is based on a book by Jun Henmi. With a framing story set in the present day, by flashbacks it tells the story of the crew of the World War II Japanese battleship Yamato, concentrating on the ship's demise during Operation Ten-Go.

== Plot ==
The film begins with footage from Asahi Shimbun's special expedition to the Yamato wreckage in 1999. The narrative then shifts to the present on 6 April 2005, where a woman, Makiko Uchida, is visiting the Yamato Museum in Kure, Hiroshima. She is looking for a boat to take her to the site where the Yamato sank, to honor the crew on the 60th anniversary of the ship's last battle. Katsumi Kamio, a Yamato survivor who is now a fisherman, agrees to take her after he discovers she was an adopted daughter of Petty Officer First Class Mamoru Uchida, a fellow crewman and close friend who he thought went down with the ship, and was confirmed to be deceased a year ago.

As Kamio, Makiko, and his teenage apprentice, Atsushi, travel to the site on his fishing boat, the narrative shifts between the present and Kamio's memories of his service as an air defense crewman aboard the warship during the Second World War.

In the spring of 1944, Kamio and other cadets, many of whom are only teenagers, are assigned to the Yamato and are subjected to harsh training and discipline at the hands of Petty Officers Uchida, Moriwaki, and Karaki, who had served on the vessel since its launch in 1941. In October 1944, the Yamato sails as part of a large Japanese fleet to engage American forces at the Battle of Leyte Gulf. During the battle, the Yamato sustains several hits, killing or injuring several crew. Yamato and the surviving ships return to Japan for repairs, while Uchida (who lost his left eye in the battle) is sent to a hospital to recover.

In March 1945, the crew hear rumors of a planned mission against the expected invasion of Okinawa and are given a few days of shore leave. During this time, Kamio returns home and learns that his mother died protecting his girlfriend, Taeko Nozaki, during an air raid on Kure. Taeko confesses her love for Kamio when he explains that he must go to Okinawa and gives him a special amulet for protection.

Uchida uses the shore leave to escape the hospital and rejoin the crew. Meanwhile, IJN representative Vice-Admiral Ryūnosuke Kusaka arrives and briefs the admiral-in-charge of Yamato, Vice-Admiral Seiichi Itō, and the other senior officers, of the details of Operation Ten-Go. It will almost certainly be a suicide mission - and with no air cover, the entire Japanese force will be extremely vulnerable to Allied attacks, making it unlikely that they will even reach Okinawa. Fights break out among the crew as some believe the mission is futile, but an officer convinces them that the Yamato, as Japan's last operational battleship, must make every effort to defend the nation.

On the morning of April 7, the Yamato and its escorts assume battle stations after Task Force 58 detects it on the way to Okinawa and sends its strike planes to intercept. The crew opens fire with their anti-aircraft weapons as the planes appear. However, the sheer number of US aircraft overwhelm the defenses and the Yamato takes heavy damage from multiple bombs and torpedo hits. Kamio, Uchida, and Moriwaki continue to man a portside AA battery after strafing runs and bomb strikes kill much of the crew, including Karaki. After being told the ship is crippled and sinking, Vice-Admiral Seiichi Itō and Captain Kōsaku Aruga give the order to abandon ship, although both choose to stay behind. Uchida and Moriwaki throw Kamio overboard despite his wish to stay with them to the end. The radioman attempts to call for support but water starts flooding the ship, which eventually capsizes and explodes after its aft magazine detonates.

The Yamato's remaining escorts start rescuing the survivors, but Kamio fails to save his friend Tetsuya Nishi despite promising his mother that he would look after him. Moriwaki ties Kamio to be hoisted aboard a rescue vessel and swims away to drown himself.

The film flashes forward to the present day; the old Kamio has a heart attack, but Makiko and Atsushi revive him. He also discusses what happened to him during the war's final months. He recounts that after the sinking, he went and told Nishi's mother that her son had died "a hero's death." Kamio expresses his grief that, despite risking his life in battle, he was ultimately unable to protect anyone he loved - Taeko died of radiation poisoning after the atomic bombing of Hiroshima, where she had been conscripted to work at a munitions plant. However, she was able to see him before she died and suggested Asukamaru as the name for his boat.

They arrive at the sinking coordinates the following day, where they hold a small ceremony. Makiko scatters Uchida's ashes and Kamio gives her a dagger that Uchida asked him to keep during the battle. The dagger was Uchida's most prized possession; Admiral Isoroku Yamamoto gave it to him when the Yamato was his flagship. The three head back to Japan after the ceremony.

The end credits show Makiko laying flowers at a memorial for those who died in the battle.

== Cast ==
- Kenichi Matsuyama - Seaman Apprentice Katsumi Kamio at 15 years old
- Tatsuya Nakadai - Katsumi Kamio at 78 years old
- Nakamura Shidō II - Petty Officer First Class Mamoru Uchida
- Takashi Sorimachi - Petty Officer First Class (Paymaster) Shōhachi Moriwaki
- Yū Aoi - Taeko Nozaki
- Jundai Yamada - Petty Officer First Class Masao Karaki
- Kenta Uchino - Seaman Apprentice Tetsuya Nishi
- Kyōka Suzuki - Makiko Uchida
- Sōsuke Ikematsu - Atsushi
- Hiroyuki Hirayama - Leading Seaman Tamaki
- Kazushige Nagashima - Lieutenant Iwao Usubuchi (Yamato Tactical Action Officer)
- Kenji Takamura - Commander Shiro Shigeki (Yamato Chief Navigating Officer)
- Umitarō Nozaki - Captain Jirō Nomura (Yamato Executive Officer)
- Tetsuya Watari - Vice-Admiral Seiichi Itō (2nd Fleet Commander-in-Chief)
- Eiji Okuda - Captain Kōsaku Aruga (Yamato Commanding Officer)
- Junichi Haruta - Captain Hisao Kotaki (21st Destroyer Division Commander)
- Hirotarō Honda - Rear Admiral Keizō Komura (2nd Destroyer Squadron Commander)
- Ryūzō Hayashi - Vice-Admiral Ryūnosuke Kusaka (Combined Fleet Chief of staff)

== Production ==
Filming for Yamato took place from March to June 2005 at a closed-down shipyard of Hitachi Zosen Corporation in Onomichi, Hiroshima Prefecture. Approximately JPY 600 million was spent in building a 1:1 scale set of the forward section and the portside anti-aircraft guns. The starboard side, aft section, and the barrels of the A turret were not built since the film only required scenes on the port side. However, compliance issues with Japan's Building Standards Act prevented the reproduction of the Yamato's pagoda tower. Instead, photographs of the Yamato Museum's own 1:10 Yamato model was used for post-production. The interior scenes were made on a sound stage, but a hall near the set shows the various rooms and props reproduced for the film.

The set was opened to the public on 17 July 2005. Approximately, one million people visited the set by the time it closed doors on 7 May 2006. The dismantling of the set began four days later and finished on June 13. The gun replicas were transferred to the Yamato Museum while the city of Onomichi kept the props and costumes.

== Release ==
Yamato was released on over 290 screens across Japan on 17 December 2005.

As part of the marketing for the film, Tamiya released special editions of scale models of the battleship in conjunction with the film's release. The company also built a special 1:350 diorama of the Yamato wreck.

== Reception ==
The film was a commercial success in the Japanese market, taking in a record 5.11 billion yen at the domestic box office. Mark Schilling of the Japan Times said the film was tailor-made for the home audience, and pulled strong performances from some of the characters.

Reviewers in the United States have described the film as a combination of Titanic and Pearl Harbor, with the finale being compared to the opening scene of Saving Private Ryan.

== Awards and nominations ==
2006 Blue Ribbon Awards

- Best Director - Junya Satō (Won)

2006 Hochi Film Awards

- Best New Actor - Kenichi Matsuyama (Won)

2006 Nikkan Sports Film Awards

- Yujirō Ishihara Award - Junya Satō (Won)

2007 Yokohama Film Festival

- Best New Talent - Kenichi Matsuyama (Won)

2007 Japan Academy Awards

- Best Director - Junya Satō (Nominated)
- Best Picture (Nominated)
- Best Supporting Actress - Yū Aoi (Nominated; Won for Hula Girls)
- Best Musical Score - Joe Hisaishi (Nominated)
- Best Cinematography - Yoshinao Sakamoto (Nominated)
- Best Lighting Direction - Takeshi Ōkubo (Nominated)
- Best Art Direction - Toshiyuki Matsumiya, Naruyuki Kondō (Won)
- Best Sound Recording - Nobuhiko Matsukage, Tetsuo Segawa (Won)
- Best Film Editing - Takeo Yoneda (Nominated)
- Rookie of the Year - Kenichi Matsuyama (Nominated)

== Home media ==
Toei Video released two Region 2 versions of the Yamato DVD on 4 August 2006. The regular edition contains postcards. The Limited Edition DVD has the film and two bonus discs that contain a tour of the Yamato set, cast interviews, and technical information on the battleship, among others, plus a 100-page booklet. Hong Kong company Universe later released the film and one of the Limited Edition's bonus discs in Region 3 format.
