= A Glorious Way to Die =

1981 military history book by Russell Spurr

- First United States edition
- Author: Russell Spurr
- Language: English
- Subject: World War II, Pacific campaign, Operation Ten-Go
- Genres: Non-fiction, military history
- Publisher: Newmarket Press
- Publication date: 1981
- Publication place: United States
- Media type: print (hardback)
- Pages: 341 (first edition)
- ISBN: 0-937858-00-5
- OCLC: 7577619
- Dewey Decimal: 940.54/5952
- LC Class: D777.5.Y33 S68

A Glorious Way to Die: The Kamikaze Mission of the Battleship Yamato, April 1945 is a 1981 military history book by Russell Spurr about the suicide mission of the Japanese battleship Yamato against the American Pacific Fleet during the Battle of Okinawa near the end of World War II. Yamato was the largest battleship in the world, and Japan sacrificed her in a final, desperate attempt to halt the Allied advance on the Japanese archipelago. The book was published in 1981 in the United States by Newmarket Press, and in the United Kingdom by Sidgwick & Jackson.

Spurr, a British journalist and editor of the Hong Kong–based Far Eastern Economic Review, interviewed Japanese and Americans involved with Yamato's last mission, and drew on Japanese naval documents and records to write the book. He tells the story from both the Japanese and American points of view.

A Glorious Way to Die was generally well received by critics and historians. American author and journalist Charles Kaiser wrote in The New York Times that the book's strength is "its ability to re-create the fear the Japanese engendered with their desperation tactics", which resulted in American perception that they were all prepared to fight to the death. A reviewer in the Canadian journal Pacific Affairs commended Spurr's "well-balanced treatment of historical evidence and his workmanship in reconstructing the tragic event", and said that the book "deserves wide reading".

== Background ==
During World War II Russell Spurr was a lieutenant in the Royal Indian Navy fighting the Japanese in Burma. After the war, in February 1946, Spurr was part of the Commonwealth occupation force stationed in the Japanese naval base of Kure in southern Japan. There he noticed a huge drydock standing empty, and after querying what it had been used for, he learnt that it was where Yamato had been built. Spurr had been isolated in Burma for several years and had never heard of Yamato, but he became interested in her story and started collecting information about the battleship.

After returning to England, Spurr worked as a journalist. In 1952 The London Daily Express sent him to Japan as its China and Far East correspondent, but he found that he had little time to resume his pursuit of information on the fate of Yamato. In the mid-1970s Spurr returned to the Far East again, this time as a writer for the Far Eastern Economic Review. He began conducting interviews about Yamato with former Japanese naval commanders and survivors of the battleship's last mission. He also gained access to Japanese naval documents and records seized by the United States, plus US interrogation transcripts. For the American side of the story, he interviewed US naval commanders and personnel involved in the sinking of Yamato. Satisfied with what he had, Spurr began writing the book in the late 1970s, over 30 years after he first found out about the battleship.

In his introduction to the book, Spurr said that he made no attempt to "gloss over the facts, unpalatable though they may be to either side." He added, "The result, I trust, presents more than the story of a ship or a sortie, but offers some insight into the agonizing dilemma of a misguided, courageous people who persisted in continuing a hopeless war."

== Synopsis ==
In A Glorious Way to Die, Russell Spurr recounts the final mission of Japanese battleship Yamato. He describes the events that led to the decision by the Japanese at Combined Fleet headquarters to send Yamato, the pride of the Imperial Japanese Navy, on a suicide mission against the American Pacific Fleet during the Battle of Okinawa near the end of World War II. Spurr tells the story of Yamato's last mission from both the Japanese and the American point of view, dramatised in a third-person narrative.

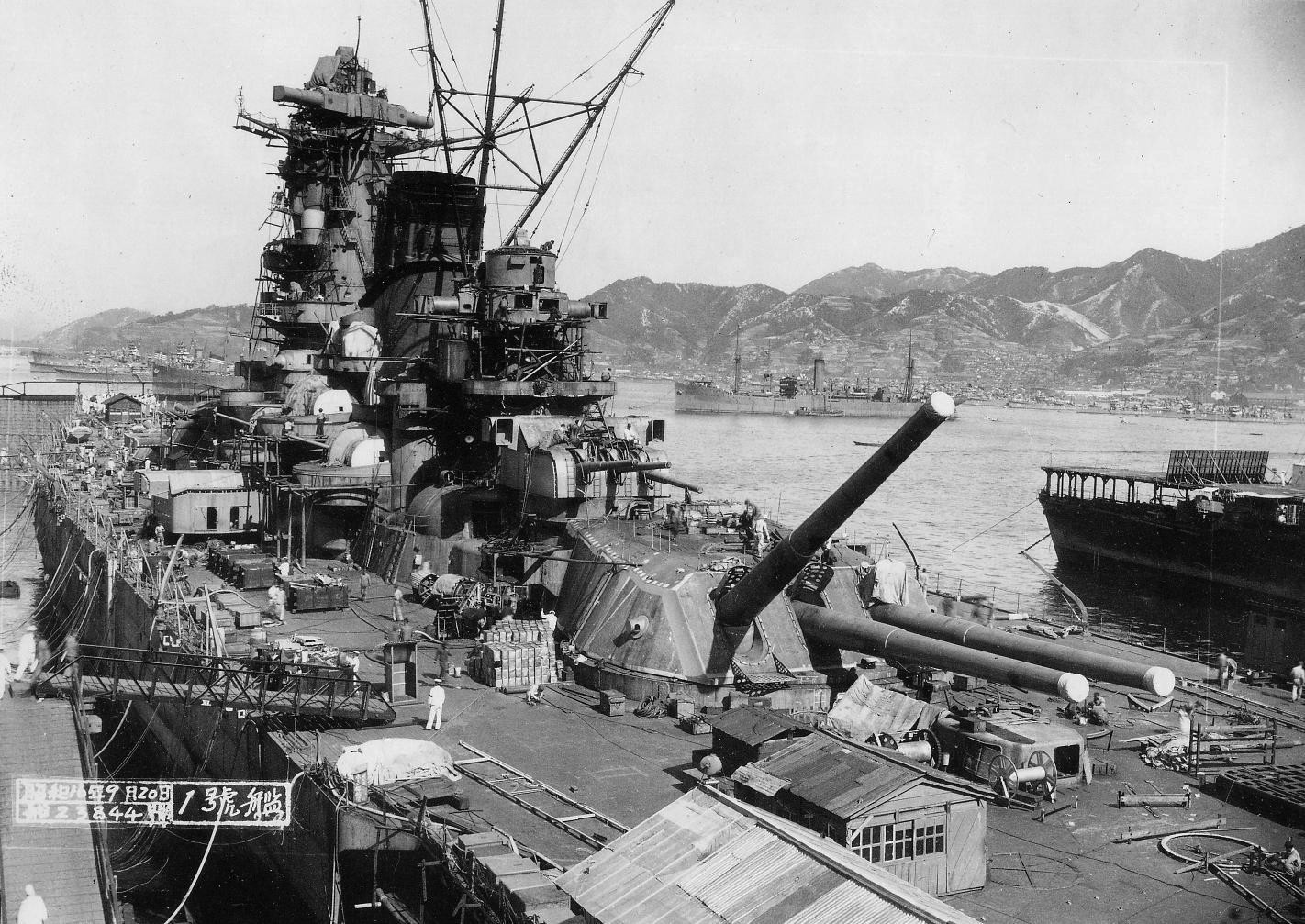
Yamato near the end of her fitting-out in September 1941

Construction of Yamato began in secrecy at the Kure naval base in 1937. She was completed soon after the Japanese attack on Pearl Harbor in December 1941, but had already been rendered obsolete by the Japanese themselves after their successful carrier-based attacks at Pearl Harbor and elsewhere. Yamato, the largest battleship in the world, with nine 18.1-inch guns with a range of over 22 miles, became, in the words of a Milwaukee Journal Sentinel reviewer, a "70,000-ton white elephant the Japanese did not quite know what to do with".

In March 1945, after the Americans had invaded Okinawa and all but eliminated the Japanese Navy, a final kamikaze mission called Operation Ten-Go (Operation Heaven One) was conceived by Japanese commanders at Combined Fleet to repulse the Allied advance on the Japanese archipelago. The plan was to send Yamato with eight support destroyers and a cruiser to Okinawa. Yamato would only be given enough fuel to reach Okinawa, and would have no air cover as all available airplanes would be used for a series of kamikaze attacks on US aircraft carriers. At Okinawa Yamato and her support craft would beach themselves and assist the island defenders. Without air cover there was little chance of Yamato reaching her destination, but, according to American author and journalist Charles Kaiser, the Japanese high command were "perfectly prepared to sacrifice the remnants of [their] fleet to avoid the stigma of surrender".

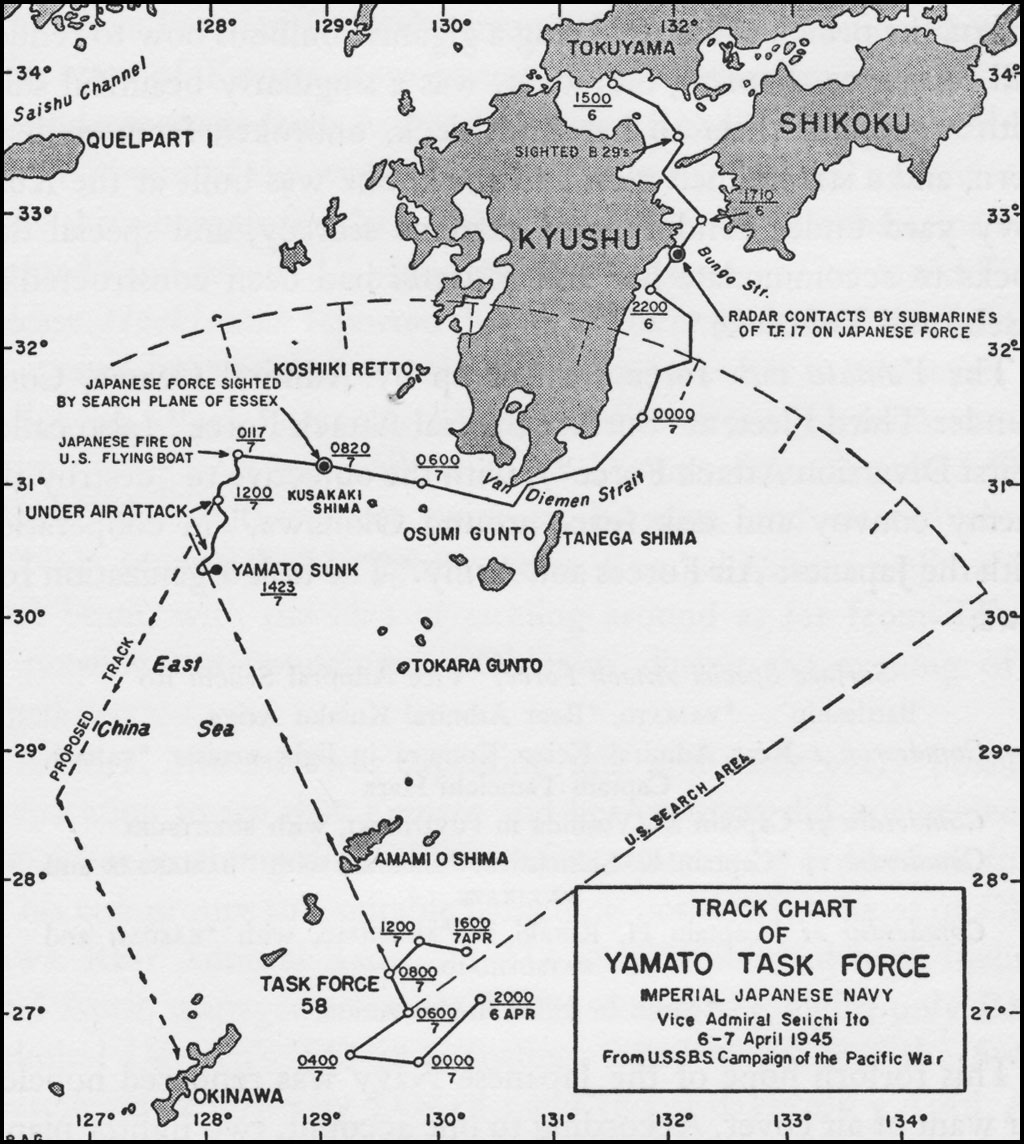
Track chart of Yamato's last sortie to Okinawa in April 1945

Not all Japanese naval officers agreed with Combined Fleet's decision to sacrifice Yamato, and while they had no choice but to comply, some committed one act of defiance by secretly supplying the battleship and the rest of her fleet with enough fuel to return home. Yamato set sail for Okinawa from the Kure naval base on March 29, 1945. On April 7, 1945, the Americans intercepted the Japanese fleet, 200 miles from Okinawa. Using 280 bombers and torpedo planes in three waves of attacks from nine aircraft carriers, they sank the battleship and five of her support ships within three hours. After Yamato went down, the Americans machine-gunned survivors in the water. Spurr explains the reason for their hatred of the Japanese:

The Americans felt no compunction about slaughtering their helpless foes. They had always fought a blatantly racial war in the Pacific – and so had the Japanese. Headline-seeking brass hats openly declared that killing Japs was no worse than killing lice. Reports of Japan's atrocities against war prisoners and even the unnatural fanaticism of the Kamikaze combined to convince the Americans that these were inhuman freaks, deserving little mercy. The apogee of brutalization was to be reached, four months later, at Hiroshima.

After the US planes left the area, the remaining Japanese support ships picked up what survivors they could from the water and returned to Kure. According to Spurr, of Yamato's total crew of 3332, only 269 survived. The Americans lost 12 men in their attack on the Japanese fleet. (Note: Not all sources report the same number of Yamato crew lost. For example, Hackett and Kingsepp (2012) indicate that 3,055 crew out of 3332 were lost, while Garzke and Dulin (1985) report that 3,063 out of 3332 were lost, concurring with Spurr.)

== Reception ==
Roger Jaynes, writing in the Milwaukee Journal Sentinel described A Glorious Way to Die as "a dramatic absorbing account of Yamato's last mission". His only complaint was that the book takes too long to "get into", and that the first 90 pages, most of which deal with background information, should have been heavily condensed. But once "Yamato finally leaves port", Jaynes said the book is "a chilling account of how more than 3,000 Japanese sailors obediently sailed to their deaths, knowing they had no air cover and that the American planes were waiting".

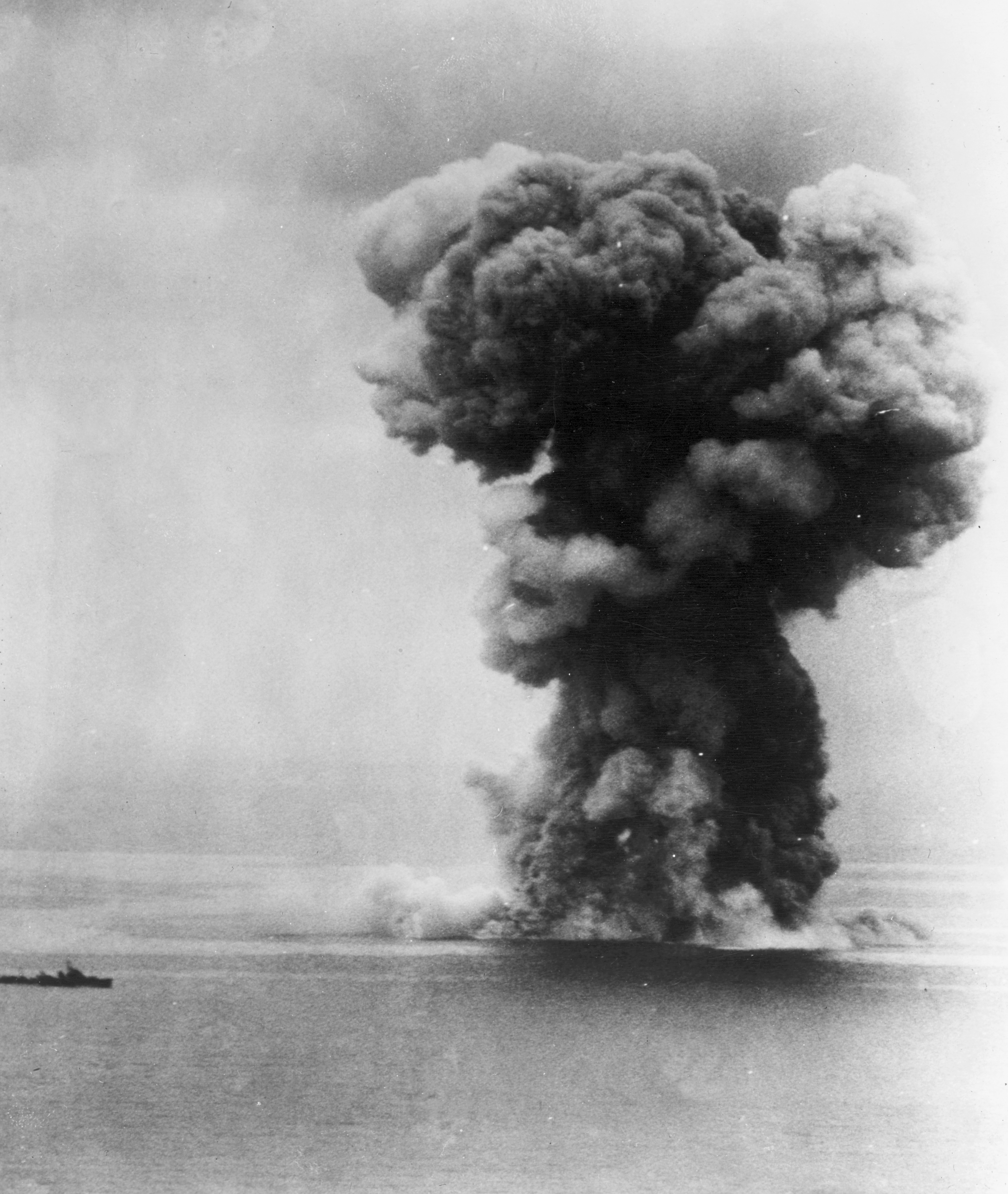
The explosion of Yamato's magazines prior to sinking

In a review of the book in The New York Times, Richard F. Shepard called it a "compelling story". He said that Spurr tells this "naval saga", which had degenerated into a "racial conflict", from the point of view of the people involved, "people who had little time for moralizing or preachments, anything but getting on with the killing". American author and journalist Charles Kaiser, also writing in The New York Times, said that the book's strength is "its ability to re-create the fear the Japanese engendered with their desperation tactics" and the resulting American perception that they were all prepared to fight to the death. Kaiser added that younger readers may have a better understanding from this book of what led to US President Truman's decision to use the atomic bomb against Japan, "even if they ... question the morality of that decision".

A reviewer at the Internet Bookwatch said the book is not just "a dry historical record", but is "aptly presented", well researched and "a worthy addition to World War II history shelves". Kirkus Reviews called the book "A gripping recreation of the last ten days in the life of HIJMS Yamato". It said that Spurr gives the battleship, which "live[s] on as a legend in Japan", "appropriately big-picture treatment", and explains Japan's "predilection for self-immolation" and its kamikaze philosophy. Kearney Smith, recounting his brother's experiences on a US Landing Craft Support ship in the Battle of Okinawa in Aboard LCS 11 in World War II: A Memoir by Lawrence B. Smith, also said that Spurr's book "give[s] lots of insight into the matter of kamikaze attacks".

In a review in the Canadian journal Pacific Affairs, Kyozo Sato noted that the book highlights the Imperial Navy's "fatal lack of foresight" in recognizing the role air support and aircraft carriers would play in naval warfare, and persisted with the construction of Yamato. It also investigates "the politics and mentality of the Japanese leadership and the morale and spirit of the fighting men and the nation". He said that Spurr's hope that his book will help explain why Japan refused to surrender, "is a modest aspiration for his well-balanced treatment of historical evidence and his workmanship in reconstructing the tragic event". Sato's opinion of the book was that it "deserves wide reading".

In 1981, A Glorious Way to Die was selected by the Military Book Club, and was a Literary Guild alternate selection.

== See also ==
- Pacific War
- List of Pacific War campaigns
- Timeline WWII - Pacific Theater

== Bibliography ==
- Spurr, Russell (2010) [1981]. A Glorious Way to Die: The Kamikaze Mission of the Battleship Yamato. Newmarket Press. ISBN 978-1-55704-913-1.

== Works citing this book ==
- Rasor, Eugene L. (1996). The Southwest Pacific Campaign, 1941–1945: Historiography and Annotated Bibliography. Greenwood Press. p. 233. ISBN 978-0-313-28874-6.
- Rose, Lisle Abbott (2007). Power at Sea Volume 2: The Breaking Storm, 1919–1945. University of Missouri Press. pp. 438, 492. ISBN 978-0-8262-1694-6.
- Rottman, Gordon (2002). World War 2 Pacific Island Guide. Greenwood Publishing Group. p. 467. ISBN 978-0-313-31395-0.
- Rottman, Gordon (2012-09-18). Okinawa 1945: The Last Battle. Osprey Publishing. p. 94. ISBN 978-1-78200-462-2.
- Smith, Kearney (2011-01-01). Aboard LCS 11 in World War II: A Memoir by Lawrence B. Smith. Xlibris Corporation. p. 96. ISBN 978-1-4568-4595-7.
