= Japanese ship Yahagi =

Yahagi may refer to one of the following ships of the Imperial Japanese Navy and the Japan Maritime Self-Defense Force, named after the Yahagi River:

- Japanese cruiser Yahagi (1911), a Chikuma-class cruiser; participated in World War I; demilitarized in 1940 and used as barracks ship Hai Kan No. 12 during World War II; scrapped in 1947
- Japanese cruiser Yahagi (1942), an Agano-class cruiser; participated in World War II; sunk by U.S. carrier-based aircraft April 7, 1945 during Operation Ten-Go
- JS Yahagi, a Mogami-class frigate
