= Yahaghi =

Yahaghi is an Iranian surname. Notable people with the surname include:

- Parviz Yahaghi, Iranian composer and violinist
- Mohammad Jafar Yahaghi, Persian writer, literary critic, editor, translator, and professor
- Behzad Yahaghi, Iranian artist and spiritualist

== See also ==
- Yahagi (disambiguation)
