= Charles Kaiser =

American author and journalist (born 1950)

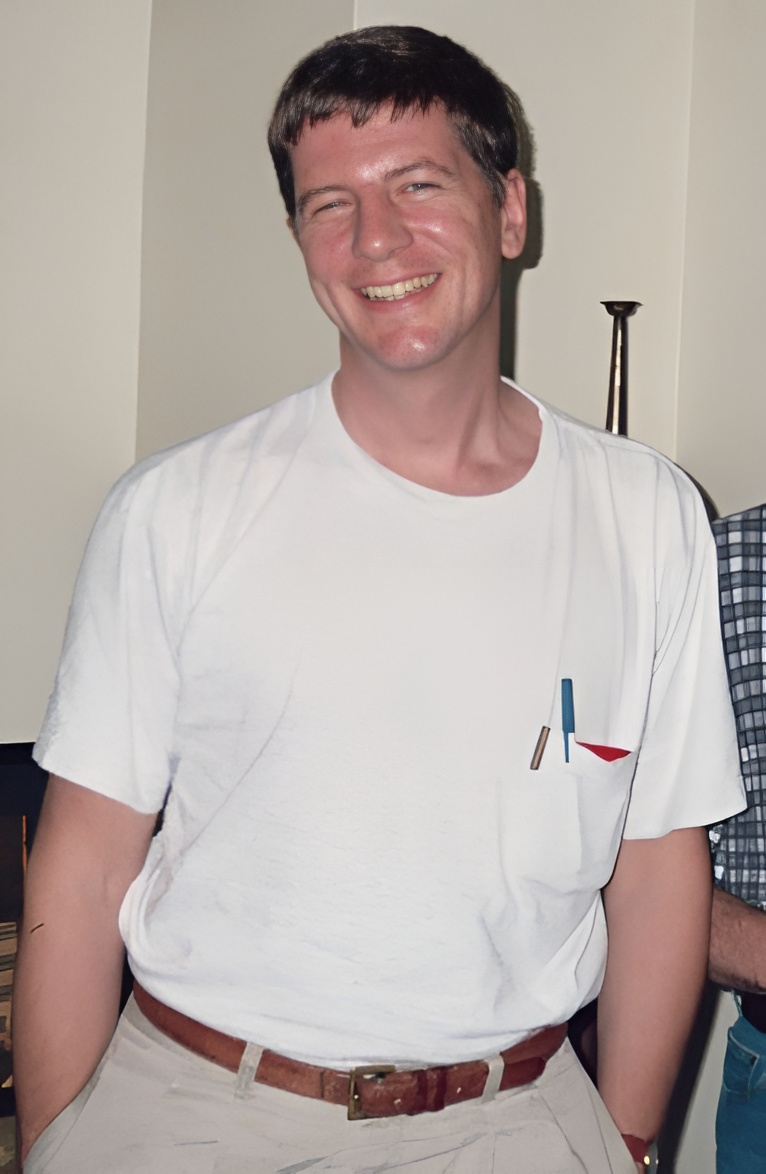
- Kaiser in 1996
- Born: Charles Kaiser; 1950 (age 75–76); Washington, D.C., United States
- Education: Columbia University
- Occupations: Journalist, author
- Spouse: Joe Stouter
- Website: charleskaiser.com

Charles Kaiser is an American author and journalist best known for his nonfiction books 1968 in America (1988), The Gay Metropolis (1997), and The Cost of Courage (2015). A former reporter for The New York Times, The Wall Street Journal, and Newsweek, he is currently a nonfiction book critic for The Guardian.

== Biography ==
Kaiser was born in Washington, D.C., the son of Philip Mayer Kaiser, a United States diplomat, and Hannah Greeley Kaiser; he has two brothers, one of them the journalist Robert Kaiser. He grew up in Washington, Albany, New York, Dakar, Senegal, London, England, Windsor, Connecticut, and New York City. Kaiser studied at Columbia University in the late 1960s and reported on protests there against the Vietnam War, he graduated in 1972, and subsequently worked as a reporter for The New York Times, The Wall Street Journal, and Newsweek. As a freelance journalist, he has contributed to The Washington Post, the Los Angeles Times, the New York Observer, New York Magazine, and Vanity Fair. His first book, 1968 in America, was published in 1988.

Kaiser's second book, The Gay Metropolis (1997), is a social history that traces the cultural accomplishments and increased social acceptance of homosexuality in America between the years 1940 and 1996. Kaiser later said that he wrote the book out of "an obligation to bear witness to what we had all lived through (during the AIDS epidemic)," explaining, "I wanted to write a book that would include AIDS, but not be overwhelmed by it". In 2007, an updated edition of The Gay Metropolis was published, and Kaiser appeared on The Colbert Report to promote the book. In 2019, The Guardian described the third updated edition of The Gay Metropolis as "one of the key popular studies of American social history [and] among the first accounts that sought to provide an extended history of gay life (admittedly mostly male) before and after Stonewall". Kaiser's book has also been cited for popularizing the theory that Judy Garland's funeral was one of the motivating factors behind the Stonewall riots.

In 2012, Kaiser wrote the afterword for a new edition of Merle Miller's landmark 1971 work On Being Different: What it Means to Be a Homosexual. Kaiser's third book, The Cost of Courage, follows the story of the Boulloches, a family who participated in the French Resistance. The book was published in 2015 to enthusiastic reviews from The Washington Post, The Wall Street Journal, and The Christian Science Monitor.

Kaiser has taught journalism at Columbia University and Princeton University. In 2018, he was named Acting Director of the LGBTQ Public Policy Center at Hunter College. Kaiser lives on the Upper West Side of Manhattan with his husband, the artist Joe Stouter.

== Bibliography ==
Title	Year	Publisher	ISBN	Ref.
1968 in America: Music, Politics, Chaos, Counterculture, and the Shaping of a Generation	1988	Grove Press	ISBN 978-1-55584-242-0	
The Gay Metropolis: 1940-1996	1997	Houghton Mifflin Harcourt	ISBN 978-0-395-65781-2	
On Being Different: What It Means to Be a Homosexual (Afterword)	2012	Penguin Random House	ISBN 978-0-14-310696-8	
The Cost of Courage	2015	Other Press	ISBN 978-1-59051-614-0	

== Honors ==
Organizations	Year	Category	Work	Result	Ref.
Lambda Literary Awards	1998	Gay Men’s Studies	The Gay Metropolis: 1940-1996	Won	
Paris Book Festival	2015	General Non-Fiction	The Cost of Courage	Won	
NLGJA: The Association of LGBTQ+ Journalists	2015	LGBTQ+ Journalists Hall of Fame	—	Honored	
