= Kōsaku Aruga =

Japanese admiral (1897–1945)

- 有賀 幸作
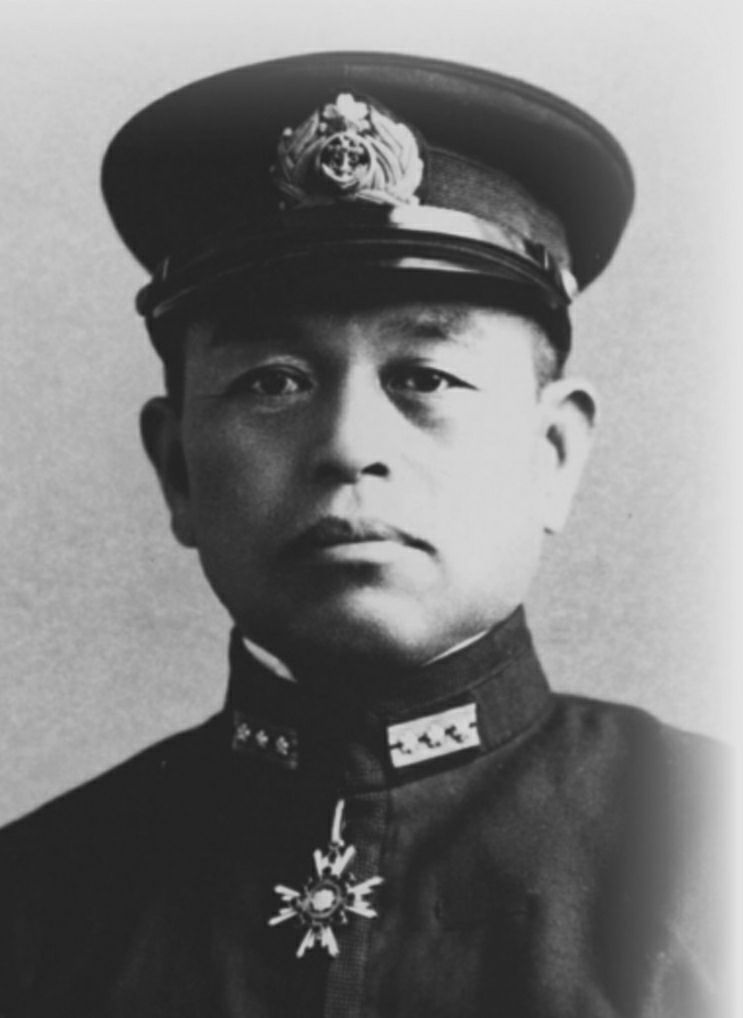
- Born: August 21, 1897; Asahi, Kamiina, Nagano, Japan
- Died: April 7, 1945 (aged 47); Southwest Kyūshū Sea
- Military career
- Allegiance: Empire of Japan
- Branch: Imperial Japanese Navy
- Service years: 1917–1945
- Rank: Vice Admiral (posthumous)
- Nickname: Chimney Man
- Commands: Yūgao, Fuyō, Tachikaze, Akikaze, Matsukaze, Inazuma, 1st Minesweeper Division, 11th Destroyer Division, 4th Destroyer Division, Chōkai, Yamato
- Conflicts: World War II; Pacific War; Battle of Midway; Battle of the Eastern Solomons; Operation Ten-Go †

Kōsaku Aruga (有賀 幸作, Aruga Kōsaku; August 21, 1897 – April 7, 1945), was a career officer in the Imperial Japanese Navy during World War II. He commanded the battleship Yamato during its final mission, Operation Ten-Go.

== Biography ==
Aruga was a native of Nagano prefecture, and graduated from the 45th class of the Imperial Japanese Navy Academy in 1917, ranked 58th of 89 cadets. He served his midshipman duty on the cruiser Iwate and battleship Hyūga, and completed naval artillery and torpedo warfare coursework from 1918 to 1919. After he was commissioned as an ensign, he served on a number of destroyers. From November 1922-November 1923, he was assigned to the battleship Nagato. After his promotion to lieutenant in December 1923, he served as chief torpedo officer on the destroyers Akikaze and Kikuzuki, followed by the light cruisers Naka and Kiso.

After his promotion to lieutenant commander in 1929, Aruga received his first command; the destroyer Yūgao. This was followed by Fuyō in 1930, Tachikaze, Akikaze in 1932, Matsukaze in 1933 and Inazuma in 1934. After a shore assignment to the Chinkai Guard District from 1935 to 1937, Aruga returned to sea as the executive officer on the cruiser Sendai. He subsequently commanded 1st Minesweeper Division and Destroyer Division 11 (DesDiv 11), and was promoted to captain in November 1940.

In June 1941, Aruga was appointed as Captain of destroyer division 4, making the destroyer Arashi his flagship, leading the destroyers Hagikaze, Nowaki, and Maikaze. At the start of the war, destroyer division 4 escorted invasion convoys and took part in shore bombardment missions to assist in the landings of the Philippines and Dutch East Indies. Captain Aruga took up a more active role at the start of March 1942, when Arashi and Nowaki hunted down allied ships attempting to escape the Dutch East Indies, and to great success. Aruga scored several victories as Arashi helped to sink the destroyer HMS Stronghold, the gunboat USS Asheville, the minesweeper HMS Scott Harly, the oil tanker Fancol, and the cargo ships Tomohon, Pageri, and Bintoehan, and helped to capture the cargo ships Bintoehan, Duymaer Van Twist, and Tjisaroea.

Arashi and the rest of destroyer division 4 escorted the Japanese aircraft carriers at the battle of Midway, 4–5 June 1942. During the action, Arashi was attacked by the submarine USS Nautilus, prompting Captain Aruga to order an attack; Arashi dropped 28 depth charges and failed to sink Nautilus. The attack allowed Arashi to be spotted by American aircraft, which trailed Arashi to the location of the Japanese aircraft carriers, leading to a devastating defeat which saw all four Japanese aircraft carriers fatally wounded by US aircraft carriers, prompting Aruga to lead destroyer division 4 in rescuing survivors from the mauled Akagi and Kaga, before scuttling both carriers with torpedo hits. After the battle, Arashi picked up the downed American pilot Ensign Wesley Osmus, who was likely murdered on Arashi's bow, stabbed in the back by a fire axe then thrown off the ship. Blame is placed on Arashi's personal commander Watanabe Yasumasa (who later died on the destroyer Numakaze).

Kōsaku Aruga continued to lead destroyer division 4, which escorted aircraft carriers at the Battle of the Eastern Solomons. In September 1942, Captain Aruga took part in the bombardment of the Gili Gili wharves and the sinking of the American freighter Anshun aboard Arashi, before escorting aircraft carriers at the battle of Santa Cruz. In December, Arashi assisted the damaged Nowaki to repairs in Yokosuka, evacuated the sinking destroyer Teruzuki, then assisted the damaged destroyer Hatsukaze. Captain Aurga's last actions in command of destroyer division 4 came when Arashi led Hagikaze and Maikaze during Operation Ke, before finally being assigned command of the heavy cruiser Chōkai in February 1943. However, Chōkai failed to engage a single enemy warship under Aruga's command due to Japan hoarding their cruisers for a battleline engagement; her only significant action was surviving the air attacks during the bombing of Rabaul in November 1943.

Recalled to Japan in June 1944 after he developed malaria, Aruga served as chief instructor at the Torpedo School until November of that year, when he was reassigned to the 2nd Fleet. On 25 November 1944, he was given command of the battleship Yamato.

In April 1945, under Operation-Ten Gō, Yamato was assigned on a suicide mission against the American forces at the Battle of Okinawa. Given only enough fuel for a one-way mission and only a cruiser and eight destroyers as an escort, Yamato was to wreak havoc on the American landing operation, and to beach herself on the Okinawa shore as a coastal fortress. On April 7, 1945, Yamato was sunk by waves of U.S. Navy carrier-based aircraft. Aruga refused to leave, lashed himself to the binnacle, and went down with his ship. He was posthumously promoted two steps in rank to vice admiral.

== In film ==
- In Yutaka Abe's 1953 film 戦艦大和 Senkan Yamato (lit. "Battleship Yamato"), Aruga was portrayed by Takamaru Sasaki.
- In Shūe Matsubayashi's 1963 film 太平洋の翼 Taiheiyo no tsubasa (lit. "Wings Over the Pacific", later released in the United States under the titles Attack Squadron! and Kamikaze), Aruga was portrayed by Seizaburô Kawazu.
- In the second episode of Leiji Matsumoto's 1974 anime series Uchū Senkan Yamato 宇宙戦艦ヤマト (lit. "Space Battleship Yamato"), Aruga was voiced by Goro Naya.
- In Shūe Matsubayashi's 1981 film 連合艦隊 Rengō Kantai (lit. "Combined Fleet", later released in the United States as The Imperial Navy), Aruga was portrayed by Ichiro Nakatani.
- In Toei's 2005 war film Yamato (男たちの大和 Otokotachi no Yamato), Aruga was portrayed by award-winning actor Eiji Okuda.

== Spelling of last name ==
Some sources render his last name as Ariga; the difference is due to an alternate reading of the first kanji character in his family name.
