= Seiichi Itō =

Japanese admiral (1890–1945)

- 伊藤 整一
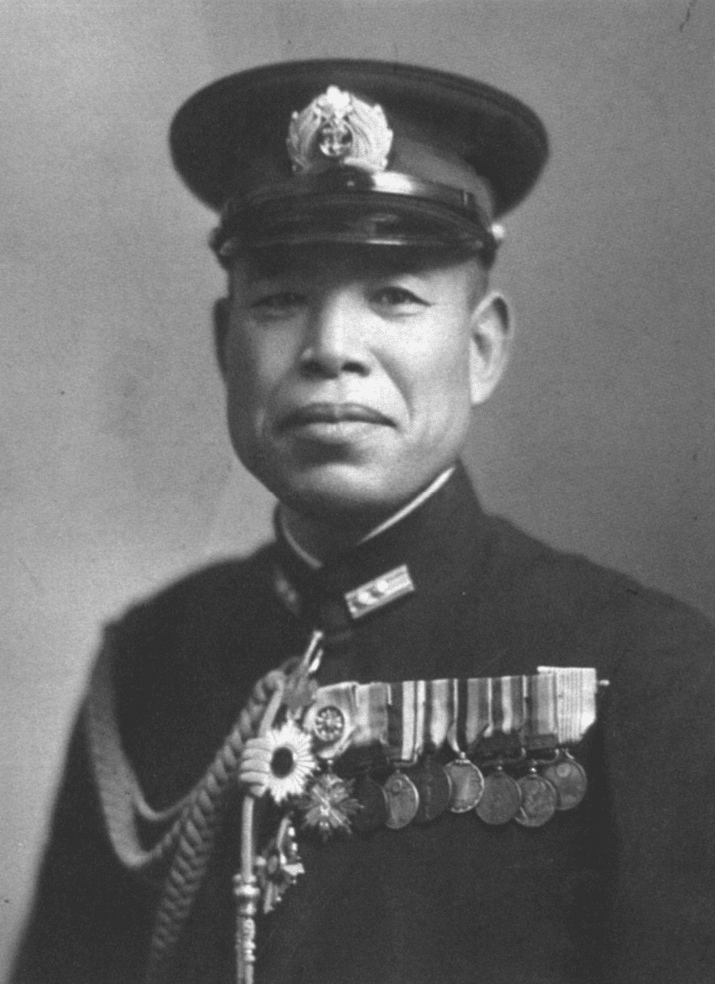
- Born: July 26, 1890; Miyama, Fukuoka, Japan
- Died: April 7, 1945 (aged 54); North of Okinawa
- Military career
- Allegiance: Empire of Japan
- Branch: Imperial Japanese Navy
- Service years: 1911–1945
- Rank: Admiral (posthumous)
- Commands: Kiso, Mogami, Atago, Haruna, Naval Personnel Bureau, 8th Squadron, Vice-chief of Navy General Staff, Naval War College, 2nd Fleet
- Conflicts: World War II; Pacific War; Battle of the East China Sea †

Seiichi Itō (伊藤 整一, Itō Seiichi; July 26, 1890 – April 7, 1945) was an admiral in the Imperial Japanese Navy and the flag officer of the task force centered around the battleship Yamato on his final mission towards the end of World War II.

== Biography ==
=== Early career ===
Born in Miike County Takada Town (present day Miyama City, Fukuoka Prefecture), Itō graduated from the 39th class of the Imperial Japanese Naval Academy in 1911. He was 15th in a class of 148 cadets, and served as midshipman on the cruiser Aso and battleship Aki.

His rise through the ranks was regular and rapid: ensign on December 1, 1912, sub-lieutenant on December 1, 1914, and lieutenant on December 1, 1917.

Itō returned to the Naval Staff College in 1923, graduating from the 21st class as a lieutenant commander. Itō visited the United States from May–December 1927, and was promoted to commander on his return. He became captain on December 1, 1931, and was assigned as naval attaché to Manchukuo from March 1932-November 1933. Along with Admiral Isoroku Yamamoto, Itō, well aware of the disparity in resources and industrial strength between the United States and Japan, was an outspoken proponent of maintaining good relations with the United States.

=== Later career ===
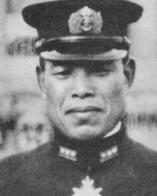
Itō as captain (1931-37)

In November 1933, Itō was given his first command as captain of the light cruiser Kiso. In November 1935, he was reassigned to command the newly commissioned heavy cruiser Mogami. In April 1936, he was given command of the heavy cruiser Atago. In December 1936, Itō was assigned command of the battleship Haruna.

On December 1, 1937, Itō became a rear Admiral and was appointed Chief of Staff to the 2nd Fleet. The following year, he was named chief of the Navy Ministry's Personnel Bureau. After serving for two years, Itō commanded Cruiser Division 8 (CruDiv 8) in November 1940 until his appointment as Chief of Staff of the Combined Fleet in April 1941.

In September of that year, Itō became Vice Chief of the Imperial Japanese Navy General Staff and was promoted to vice admiral a month later on October 15, 1941. He held this post until December 1944, when he was placed in command of the 2nd Fleet, based on the Inland Sea.

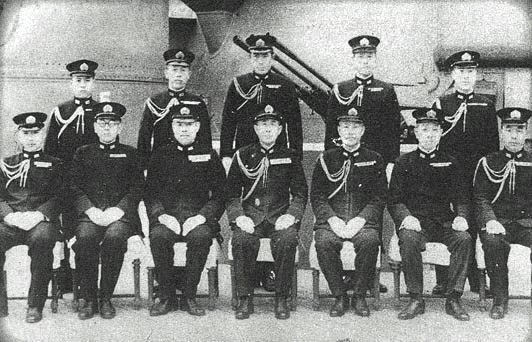
2nd Fleet Staff in Yamato. The third person from left in front is Itō

In early April 1945, Ito commanded the last major offensive by the Imperial Japanese Navy when he led the battleship Yamato on its final sortie accompanied by the light cruiser Yahagi and eight destroyers in Operation Ten-Go, which aimed to destroy United States Navy during the Battle of Okinawa. Itō initially opposed the mission, which he viewed as futile and wasteful, but ultimately relented, after being informed that the Emperor was expecting the Navy to mount some kind of attack. On 7 April 1945, U.S. aircraft sighted the Japanese ships heading for Okinawa and subsequently several hundred American carrier aircraft attacked them. With no Japanese air support available, the Japanese ships were overwhelmed, and Yamato, Yahagi, and four of the destroyers were sunk by multiple bomb and torpedo hits. After ordering the mission cancelled and for the remaining escorts to rescue survivors, Itō chose to go down with the Yamato.

Itō was posthumously promoted to full admiral. Ten days after his death, his only son died taking part in a kamikaze attack near Okinawa.

== In film ==
- In Toei's 2005 war film Yamato (男たちの大和 Otokotachi no Yamato), Itō was portrayed by Japanese actor Tetsuya Watari.
- In Shūe Matsubayashi's 1981 film Rengō Kantai 連合艦隊 (lit. "Combined Fleet", later released in the United States as The Imperial Navy), Itō was portrayed by Kōji Tsuruta.
- In Shūe Matsubayashi's 1963 film Taiheiyo no tsubasa 太平洋の翼 (lit. "Wings Over the Pacific", later released in the United States under the titles Attack Squadron! and Kamikaze), Itō was portrayed by Susumu Fujita.
- In Yutaka Abe's 1953 film Senkan Yamato 戦艦大和 (lit. "Battleship Yamato"), Itō was portrayed by Minoru Takada.

== Notes ==
Military offices
Preceded by Komatsu Teruhisa	Kiso; Commanding Officer; 15 November 1933 – 10 March 1934	Succeeded by Kakuta Kakuji
Preceded by Samejima Tomoshige	Mogami; Commanding Officer; 15 November 1935 – 15 April 1936	Succeeded by Kobayashi Tetsuri
Preceded by Suzukida Kōzō	Atago; Commanding Officer; 15 April 1936 – 1 December 1936	Succeeded by Gotō Aritomo
Preceded by Ozawa Jisaburō	Haruna; Commanding Officer; 1 December 1936 – 15 November 1937	Succeeded by Ōshima Kenshirō
Preceded by Mikawa Gunichi	2nd Fleet; Chief-of-staff; 15 November 1937 – 15 November 1938	Succeeded by Takagi Takeo
Preceded by Shimizu Mitsumi	Naval Personnel Bureau; Director; 15 December 1938 – 28 November 1940	Succeeded by Nakahara Yoshimasa
Preceded by Gotō Eiji	8th Squadron; Commander-in-chief; 28 November 1940 – 10 April 1941	Succeeded by Ugaki Matome
Preceded by Fukudome Shigeru	1st Fleet; Chief-of-staff; 10 April – 1 August 1941	Succeeded by Ugaki Matome
Preceded by Fukudome Shigeru	Combined Fleet; Chief-of-staff; 10 April – 1 August 1941	Succeeded by Ugaki Matome
Preceded by Kondō Nobutake	Navy General Staff; Vice-Chairman; 1 September 1941 – 18 November 1944	Succeeded by Ozawa Jisaburō
Preceded by Ozawa Jisaburō	Naval War College; Headmaster; 18 October 1941 – 1 June 1942	Succeeded by Inagaki Ayao
Preceded by Yoshida Zengo	Naval War College; Headmaster; 15 March – 18 November 1944	Succeeded by Ozawa Jisaburō
Preceded by Kurita Takeo	2nd Fleet; Commander-in-chief; 23 December 1944 – 7 April 1945	Succeeded by Fleet dissolved
