= Yahagi River =

Coordinates: 34°49′14″N 136°58′14″E

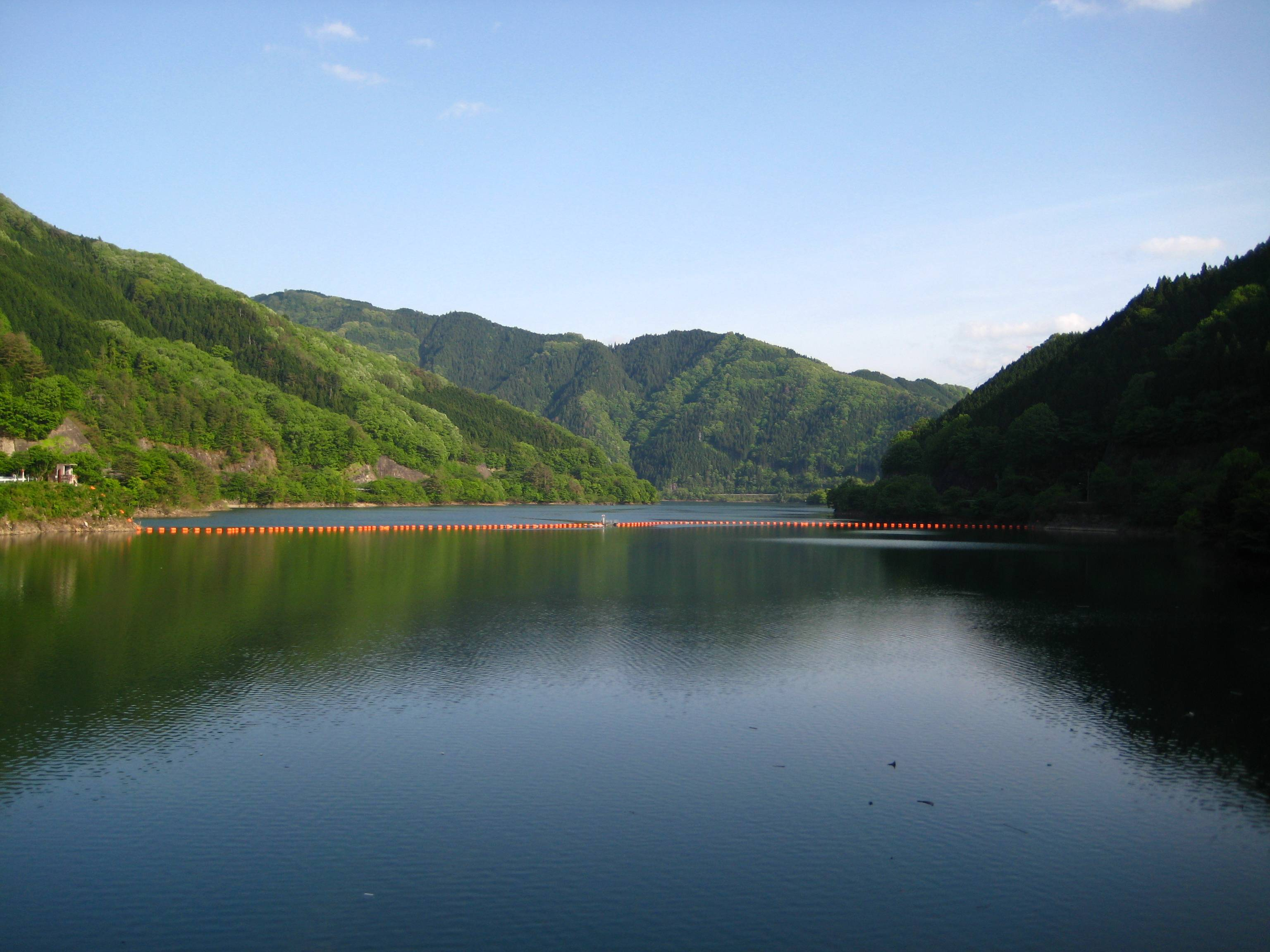
- Yahagi Dam Lake

- Native name: 矢作川 (Japanese)

Location
- Country: Japan

Physical characteristics
- Source
  - location: Mount Ōkawairi
  - elevation: 1,908 m (6,260 ft)
- Mouth
  - location: Mikawa Bay
- Length: 117 km (73 mi)
- Basin size: 1,830 km^{2} (710 sq mi)
- Discharge
  - average: 37.46 m^{3}/s (1,323 cu ft/s)

Basin features
- River system: Yahagi River

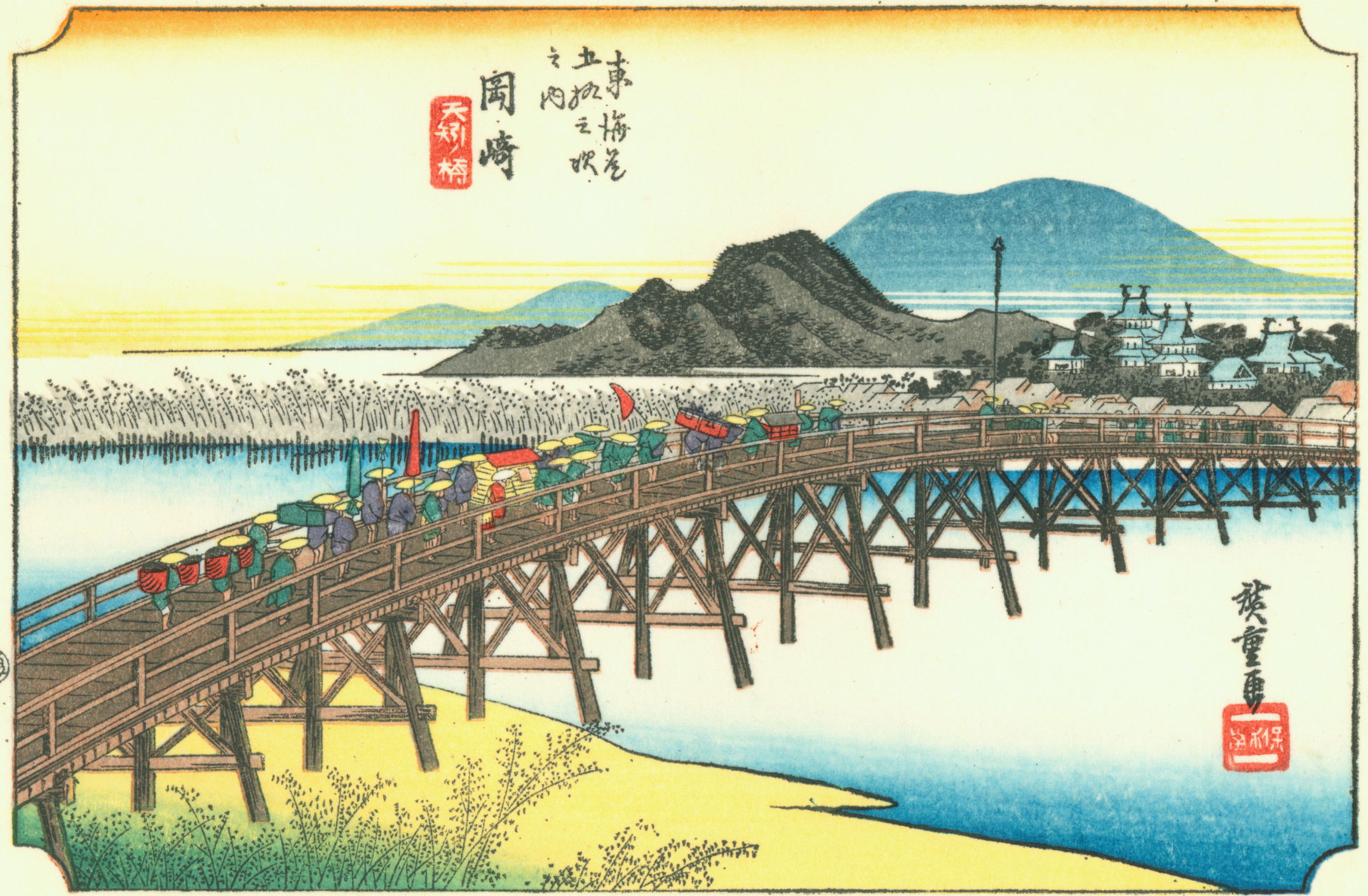
Hiroshige

The Yahagi River (矢作川, Yahagi-gawa) is a river that flows from Nagano Prefecture's Mount Ōkawairi, through Gifu Prefecture, and enters Mikawa Bay from Aichi Prefecture in Japan. It is designated an A class river by the Ministry of Land, Infrastructure, Transport and Tourism (MLIT).

== Geography ==
After flowing south from Mount Ōkawairi, the river enters Gifu Prefecture and forms the prefectural border with Aichi Prefecture between the cities of Ena and Toyota. Downstream, the Yahagifuru River (矢作古川 Yahagifuru-kawa) follows the original path of the river; however, the river was changed to its current path at the beginning of the Edo period because of flooding. The river forms the border between the cities of Nishio and Hekinan when it flows into Mikawa Bay.

== River Communities ==
Nagano Prefecture
Neba, Hiraya (Shimoina District)
Gifu Prefecture
Ena
Aichi Prefecture
Toyota, Okazaki, Anjō, Nishio, Hekinan

== See also ==
- Japanese ship Yahagi
