= Keizō Komura =

Japanese Navy rear admiral

- 古村 啓蔵
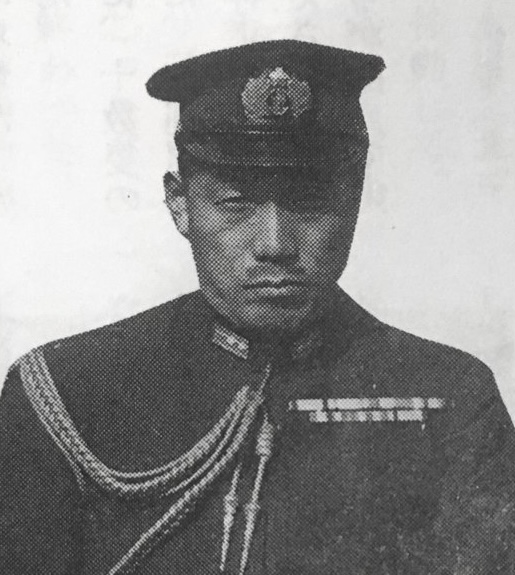
- Born: 20 July 1896; Nakanojo, Gunma, Japan
- Died: 7 February 1978 (aged 81); Tokyo, Japan
- Military career
- Allegiance: Empire of Japan
- Branch: Imperial Japanese Navy
- Service years: 1917–1945
- Rank: Rear Admiral
- Commands: Kuretake, Namikaze, 2nd Destroyer Division, Chikuma, Fusō, Musashi, 1st Carrier Division, 2nd Destroyer Squadron
- Conflicts: World War II; Pacific War; Attack on Pearl Harbor; Indian Ocean Raid; Battle of Midway; Battle of Santa Cruz; Battle of the Philippine Sea; Operation Ten-Go

Keizō Komura (古村 啓蔵, Komura Keizō; 20 July 1896 – 7 February 1978) was a Rear Admiral in the Imperial Japanese Navy during World War II.

== Biography ==
Komura was born in Nakanojo, Gunma prefecture. He graduated from the 45th class of the Imperial Japanese Naval Academy in 1917, ranked 10th in his class of 89 cadets. As midshipman, Komura served on the cruiser Iwate and battleship Settsu. After his commissioning as ensign, he was assigned to the battleships Hizen and Suwo. He later served in various capacities aboard the battleship Nagato, destroyers Nire and Hokaze, and cruisers Izumo, Kako and Jintsu.

Komura graduated from the Naval Staff College in 1929, and with a promotion to lieutenant commander assumed command of the destroyer Kuretake, followed by the Namikaze two years later. From 1932 to 1934, he was naval attaché to the United Kingdom. After his return to Japan, he served in various staff positions. He was promoted to captain on 15 November 1938.

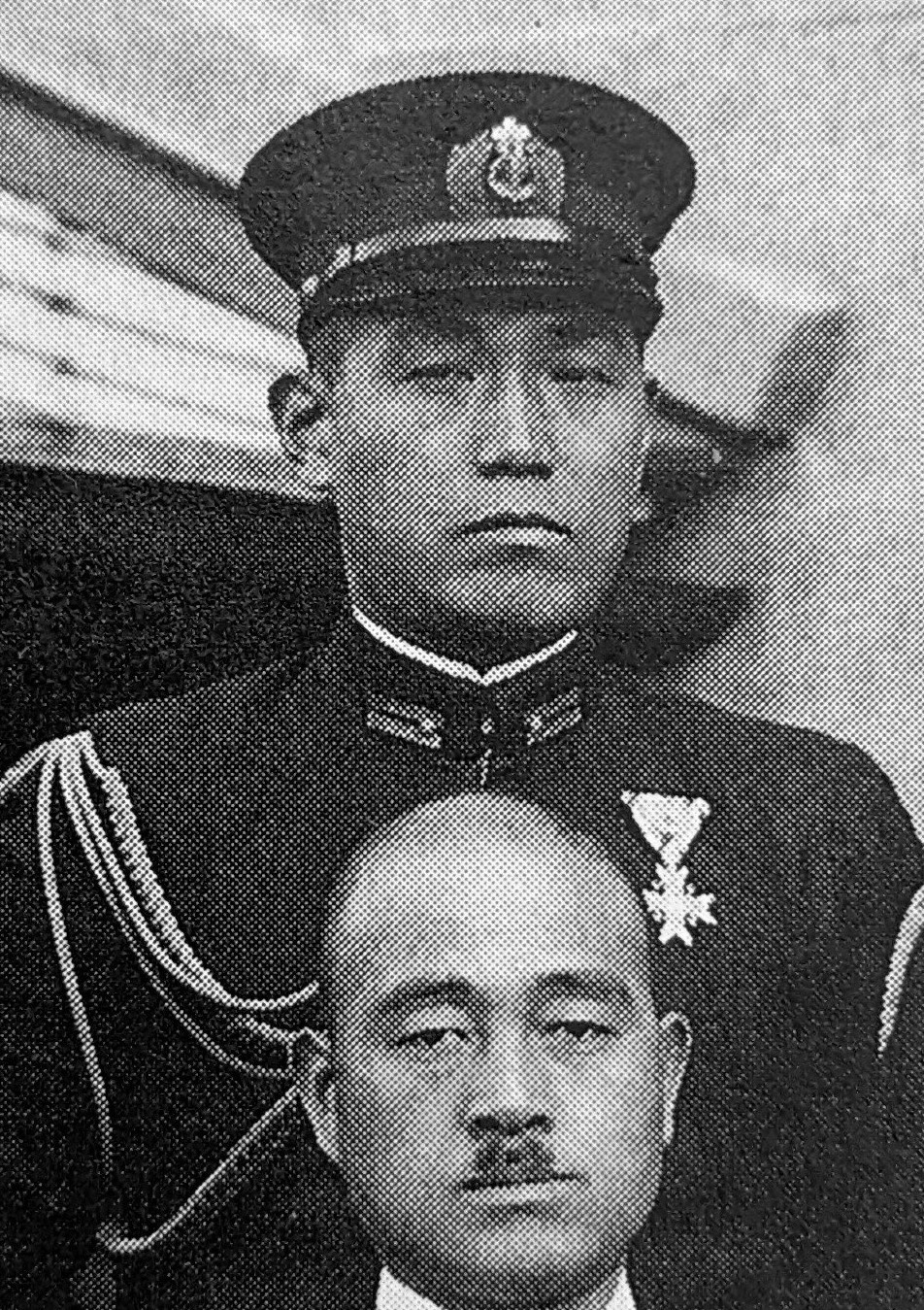
Keizō Komura

Komura commanded the cruiser Chikuma during the attack on Pearl Harbor on 7 December 1941. Participating in naval operations in the Indian Ocean with the carrier task force, Komura took part in several battles including the Battle of Midway and the Battle of Santa Cruz.

Komura was captain of the battleship Fusō from December 1942-June 1943 and Musashi from June–December 1943.

Komura was promoted to rear admiral on 1 November 1943. Appointed chief of staff of the First Task Force, Komura took part in the Battle of the Philippine Sea in June 1944. In October 1944, Komura assumed command of the 1st Carrier Division shortly before the Battle of Leyte Gulf.

On 16 November 1944, the light cruiser Yahagi was assigned as the flagship of Rear Admiral Komura's new DesRon 2. On 6 April 1945, Komura received orders for Operation Ten-Go, to attack the American invasion force on Okinawa. Yahagi was ordered to accompany battleship Yamato from Tokushima for its final suicide mission against the American fleet.

At 12:20 on 7 April, the Yamato force was attacked by waves of 386 aircraft (180 fighters, 75 dive bombers, 131 torpedo bombers) from Task Force 58.

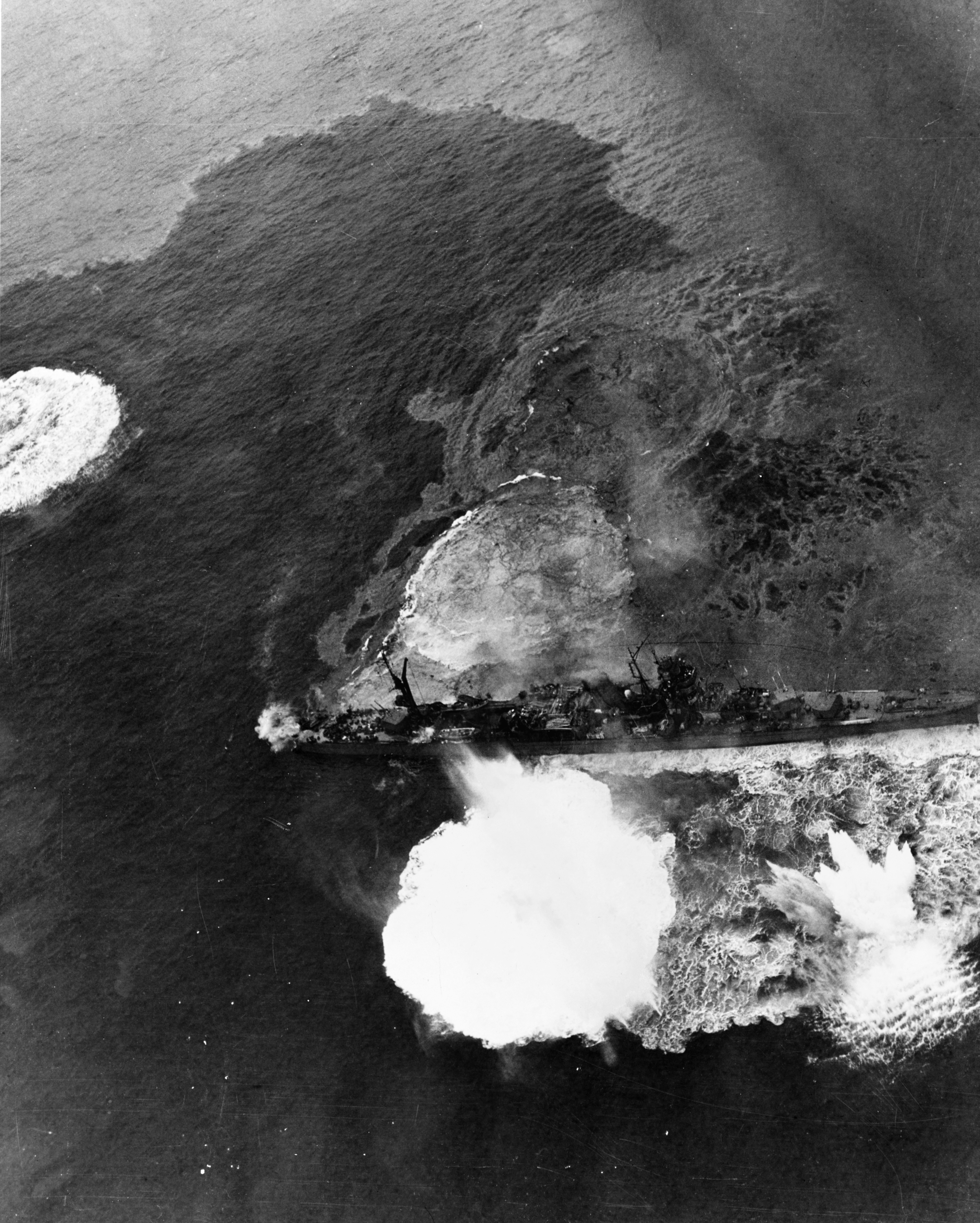
Light cruiser Yahagi under intense bomb and torpedo attack

At 12:46, a torpedo hit Yahagi directly in her engine room, killing the entire engineering room crew and bringing her to a complete stop. Dead in the water, Yahagi was hit by at least six more torpedoes and 12 bombs by succeeding waves of air attacks. Yahagi capsized and sank at 14:05 at 30°47′N 128°08′E taking 445 crewmen with her. Komura was among the survivors rescued by the destroyer Yukikaze.

Recalled to Japan in May, Komura was stationed in Tokyo Bay as commanding officer of Yokosuka Naval District until 30 November 1945.

Komura lived on after the war until 1978. He was portrayed by actor Hirotarō Honda in the 2005 Japanese movie Yamato.
