= Operation Kikusui I =

Japanese naval operation in World War II

- Part of the Battle of Okinawa and the Pacific War
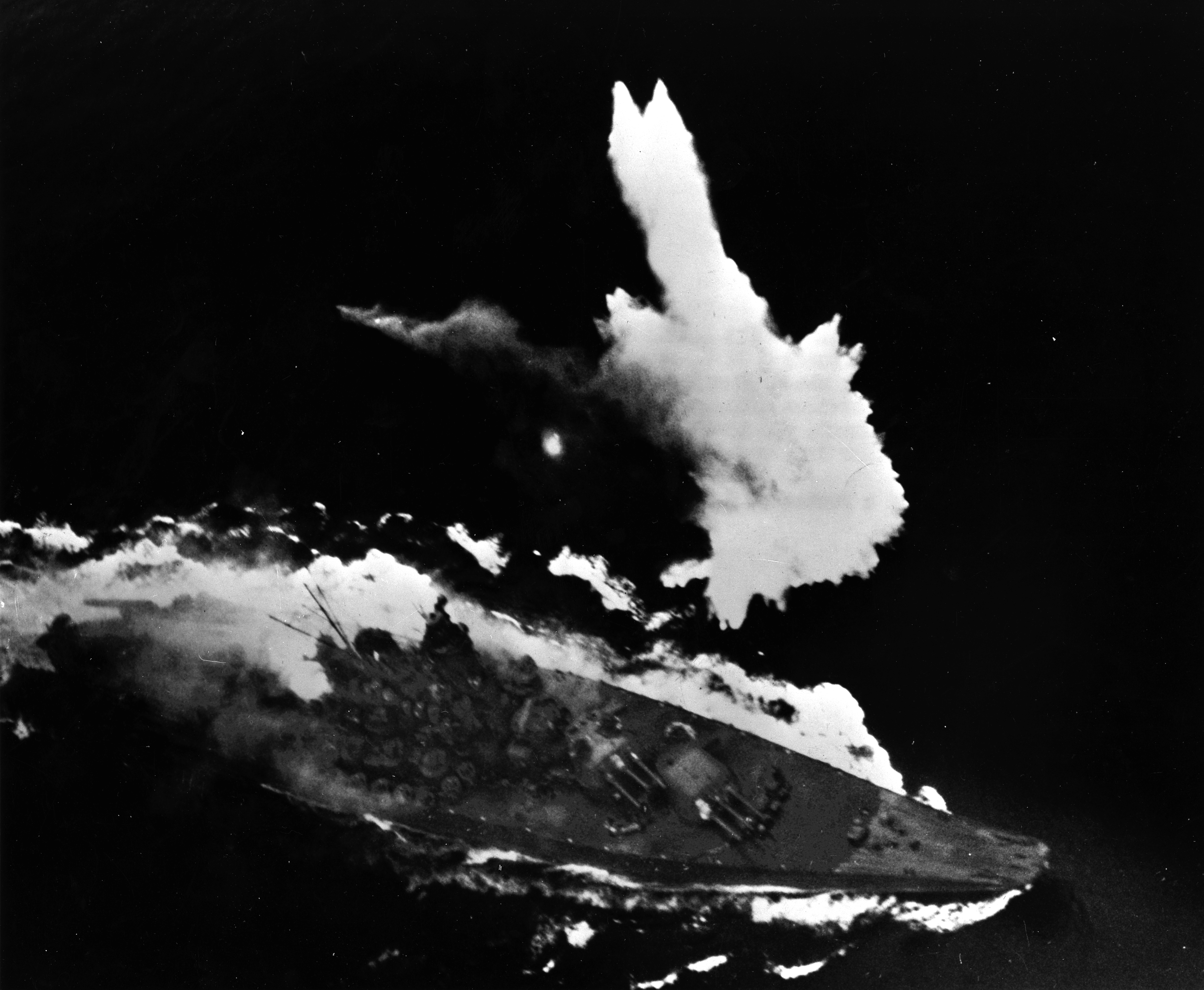
- Yamato under attack
Date	7 April 1945; 81 years ago
Location	Between Kyushu and the Ryukyu Islands
Result	American victory

Belligerents
United States	Japan

Commanders and leaders
Marc Mitscher; Joseph J. Clark; Frederick C. Sherman	Seiichi Itō †; Keizō Komura; Kosaku Aruga †; Tameichi Hara

Units involved
(United States) Fifth Fleet: Task Force 58	(Empire of Japan) 2nd Fleet

Strength
11 aircraft carriers; 6 battleships; 11 cruisers; 30+ destroyers; 386 aircraft	Battleship Yamato; Light cruiser Yahagi; 8 destroyers; 115 aircraft, mostly kamikaze

Casualties and losses
97 killed; 122 wounded; 10-13 aircraft destroyed; 1 aircraft carrier damaged; 2 battleships damaged; 1 destroyer damaged; 52 aircraft damaged	4,137 killed; Yamato sunk; Yahagi sunk; 4 destroyers sunk; 1 destroyer severely damaged; ~100 aircraft destroyed

Operation Kikusui I (菊水作戦, Kikusui Sakusen 1; Operation Chrysanthemum Water 1), best known as Operation Ten-Go (天号作戦, Ten-Gō Sakusen), literally Operation Heaven and in Japanese sources as the Battle off Cape Bono (坊ノ岬沖海戦, Bōno Misaki Oki-Kaisen) was the last major Japanese naval operation in the Pacific Theater of World War II. In April 1945, the Japanese battleship Yamato, the largest battleship in the world, and nine other Japanese warships, embarked from Japan for a suicide attack on Allied forces engaged in the Battle of Okinawa. The Japanese force was attacked by U.S. carrier-borne aircraft before it could reach Okinawa; Yamato and five other Japanese warships were sunk, while 10 American aircraft were shot down. Several ships in the U.S. carrier task force suffered moderate damage from aerial kamikaze attacks, while 100 Japanese planes were lost. Operation Kikusui I, best known as Operation Ten-Go, refers specifically to Yamato's sortie, while Operation Kikusui refers specifically to all Japanese kamikaze operations during the entire Okinawa campaign.

The sinking of Yamato demonstrated U.S. air supremacy in the Asiatic-Pacific Theater and the vulnerability of surface ships without air cover to aerial attack. The battle also exhibited Japan's willingness to make extreme sacrifices in kamikaze attacks aimed at delaying the Allied advance upon the Japanese home islands.

Furthermore, the engagement was also paramount by enabling U.S. forces to prevent Japan from holding a significant advantage over the Allies at Okinawa. The designation of Yamato as a beached fortification against Allied aerial and naval bombardment of Okinawa would have become detrimental towards the invading armies, in that, alike to Operation Downfall, the anticipated losses would have substantially increased for maritime combatants at large, likewise with surrounding infantry support. Historians generally accept that the prior removal of Yamato from the scene was a preliminary objective of the Allies before any further assaults.

== Background ==
By early 1945, following the Solomon Islands campaign, the Battle of the Philippine Sea, and the Battle of Leyte Gulf, the once-formidable Imperial Japanese Navy's Combined Fleet was reduced to just a handful of operational warships and a few remaining aircraft and aircrew. Most of the remaining Japanese warships in the Combined Fleet were stationed at ports in Japan, with most of the large ships at the port of Kure in the Hiroshima Prefecture on the main Japanese island of Honshu.

As a final step before the planned invasion of the Japanese home islands, Allied forces invaded Okinawa on 1 April 1945. In March, when briefing Emperor Hirohito on Japan's response to the expected invasion of Okinawa, Japanese military leaders explained that the Imperial Japanese Army was planning extensive air attacks, including the use of kamikaze tactics. The emperor then reportedly asked, "But what about the Navy? What are they doing to assist in defending Okinawa? Have we no more ships?" Feeling pressured by the emperor to mount some kind of attack, Japanese Navy commanders conceived a kamikaze-type mission for their remaining operational large ships, which included the battleship Yamato.

The resulting plan, drafted under the direction of the commander-in-chief of the Combined Fleet, Admiral Soemu Toyoda, called for Yamato and her escorts to attack the U.S. fleet supporting troops landing on the western coast of Okinawa. Yamato and her escorts were to fight their way to Okinawa and then beach themselves between Higashi and Yomitan and fight as shore batteries until they were destroyed. Once the ships were destroyed, their surviving crew members were supposed to abandon ship and fight on land. Very little, if any, air cover could be provided for the ships, which would render them almost helpless to concentrated attacks from U.S. carrier-based aircraft. In preparation for executing the plan, on 29 March the assigned ships left Kure for Tokuyama, off the port of Mitajiri on the southern coast of Honshu. Despite obeying orders to prepare for the mission, the commander of the Ten-Go force, Vice Admiral Seiichi Itō, still refused to actually order his ships to carry it out, believing the plan to be futile and wasteful.

Other officers of the Imperial Japanese Navy (IJN) also had very negative views about the operation, believing that it was a waste of human life and fuel. Captain Atsushi Ōi, an operations officer at Grand Escort Command, was critical as fuel and resources were diverted from other operations. As he was told that the aim of this operation was "the tradition and the glory of the Navy," he shouted: "this war is of our nation and why should the honor of our 'surface fleet' be more respected? Who cares about their glory? Damn fools!".

Vice Admiral Ryūnosuke Kusaka flew from Tokyo to Tokuyama on 5 April in a final attempt to convince Itō and the assembled commanders of the Combined Fleet to accept the plan. Upon hearing of the proposed operation—which had been kept secret from most of them—the Combined Fleet commanders and captains unanimously joined Itō in rejecting it for the same reasons that he had expressed. Kusaka then explained that the Navy's attack would help divert U.S. aircraft away from the Army's planned kamikaze attacks on the U.S. fleet at Okinawa. He also explained that Japan's national leadership, including the emperor, were expecting the IJN to make their best effort to support the defense of Okinawa.

Upon hearing this, the Combined Fleet commanders relented and accepted the proposed plan. The ships' crews were briefed on the nature of the mission and given the opportunity to stay behind if desired; none did. However, about 80 crew members who were new, sick, or infirm were ordered off the ships, including 67 naval cadets of Etajima Naval Academy Class No. 74, who had arrived on the battleship three days earlier. The ships' crews engaged in some last-minute intense drills to prepare for the mission, mostly practicing damage-control procedures. At midnight, the ships were fueled. Reportedly, in secret defiance of orders to provide the ships with only just enough fuel to reach Okinawa, the Tokuyama personnel actually gave Yamato and the other ships almost all of the remaining fuel in the port, although this probably still was not enough to allow the force to return to Japan from Okinawa. Yamato's executive officer organised a party for the crew for the evening of 5 April, during which many of the officers and sailors drank heavily.

The U.S. Navy was able to monitor preparations for Operation Ten-Go by decoding Japanese radio signals. Through this source, the Americans received conclusive intelligence on 5 and 6 April that the attack was to be attempted. Admiral Raymond Spruance, commander of the United States Fifth Fleet, ordered his forces to prepare to attack the Japanese at 00:30 on 6 April, before Yamato and her escorts sailed.

== Prelude ==
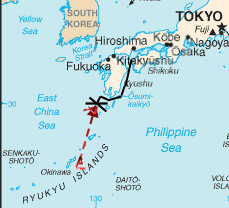
Routes to the area of battle

At 16:00 on 6 April, Yamato (with Vice Admiral Itō on board), the light cruiser Yahagi, and eight destroyers (Asashimo, Hamakaze, Isokaze, Suzutsuki, Hatsushimo, Yukikaze, Fuyutsuki, and Kasumi) departed Tokuyama to begin the mission. Two American submarines, Threadfin and Hackleback, sighted the Japanese force as it proceeded south through the Bungo Channel. Although they were unable to attack because of the ships' speed, they did spend several hours shadowing the Japanese sortie and sending updates on its course to the U.S. fleet. The submarines' messages, which were reportedly sent uncoded, were also picked up by radio operators on the Japanese ships.

At dawn on 7 April, the Japanese force passed the Ōsumi Peninsula into the open ocean heading south from Kyūshū toward Okinawa. They shifted into a defensive formation, with Yahagi leading Yamato and the eight destroyers deployed in a ring around the two larger ships, with each ship 1,500 m (1,600 yd) from each other and proceeding at 20 kn (23 mph; 37 km/h). The destroyer Asashimo developed engine trouble and turned back. U.S. reconnaissance aircraft began to shadow the main force of ships. At 10:00, the force turned west to make it look like they were withdrawing, but at 11:30, after being detected by two American PBM Mariner flying boats, the Yamato fired a salvo with her 460 mm (18.1 in) bow guns using special "beehive" shells (三式焼霰弾; san-shiki shōsan dan), but could not prevent the two planes from shadowing. The forces then turned back towards Okinawa.

Upon receiving contact reports early on 7 April, Spruance ordered Task Force 54, which consisted mostly of modernized standard-type battleships under the command of Rear Admiral Morton Deyo (which were engaged in shore bombardment), to intercept and destroy the Japanese sortie. Deyo moved to execute his orders, but Vice Admiral Marc A. Mitscher, who commanded Task Force 58, pre-empted Spruance and Deyo by launching a massive air strike from his carriers, without informing Spruance until after the launches were completed. Vice Admiral Mitscher, a senior naval aviation officer, had long challenged the battleship-centric doctrines that had dominated U.S. naval strategy for much of the 20th century. His career was defined by a fundamental dispute between advocates of traditional surface fleets and proponents of carrier-based air power—a rivalry embodied in his relationship with his immediate superior, Admiral Raymond Spruance. Although aircraft carriers had played central roles in the major Pacific battles, the ability of air power to independently overcome enemy surface forces had not been demonstrated conclusively. In this context, Operation Kikusui provided a pivotal opportunity to test and potentially confirm the supremacy of carrier-based operations over traditional battleship forces.

Around 10:00 on 7 April, Task Groups 58.1 and 58.3 began launching 280 aircraft from their carriers. Task Group 58.4 launched a further 106 aircraft. The aircraft consisted of F6F Hellcat and F4U Corsair fighters, SB2C Helldiver dive bombers, and TBF Avenger torpedo bombers. Overall, 15 carriers launched aircraft. The air groups launched from five carriers became lost in bad weather and were not able to attack. As a contingency, Spruance ordered Deyo to assemble a force of six battleships, seven cruisers, and 21 destroyers to prepare for a surface engagement with Yamato should the airstrikes prove unsuccessful.

== Battle ==
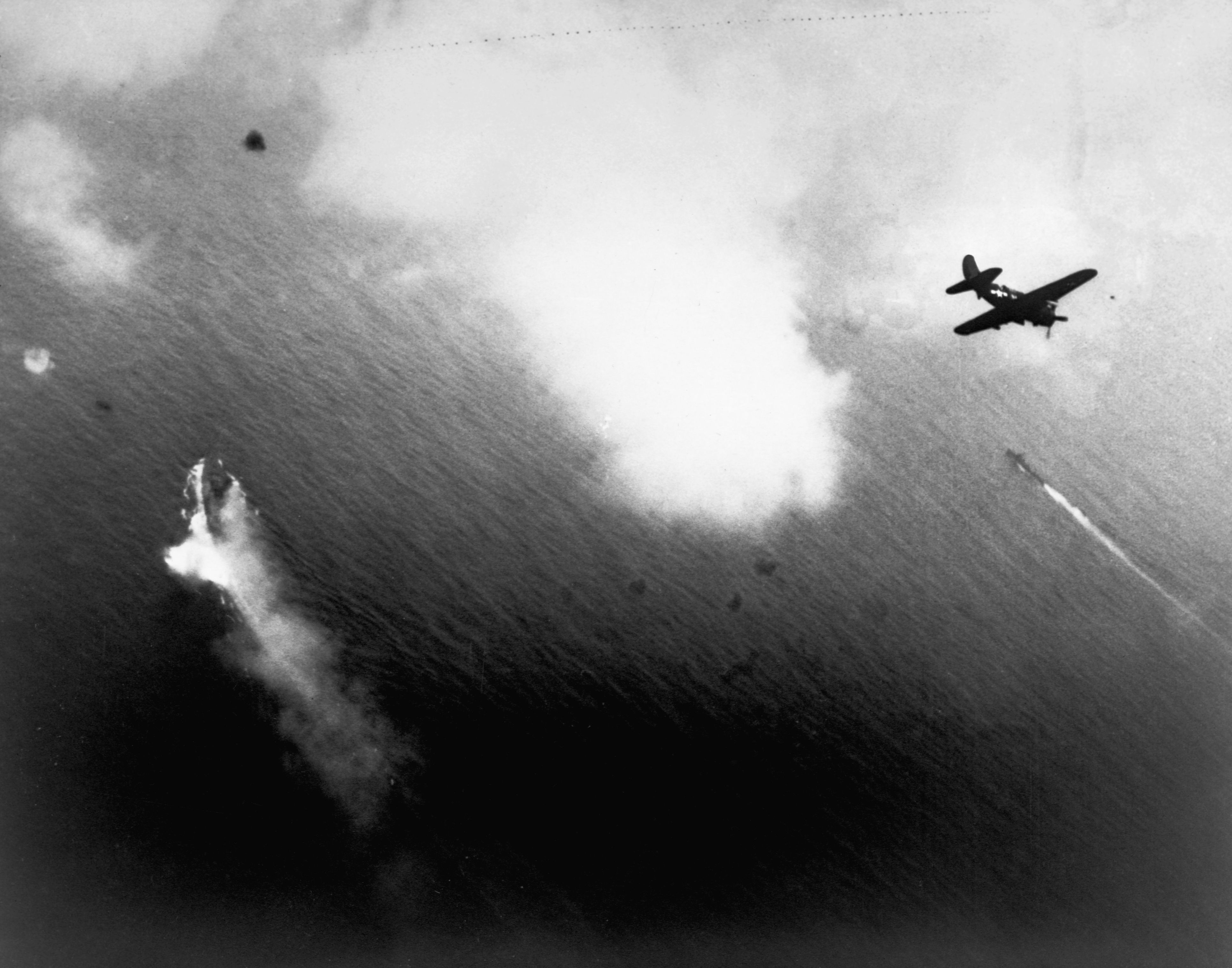
Aircraft such as this SB2C Helldiver begin their attacks on Yamato

Around noon, the first American aircraft arrived over Yamato; these were F6F Hellcat and F4U Corsair fighters conducting a fighter sweep of any Japanese aircraft defending the battle group; however, the severely depleted Imperial Japanese Army Air Force could muster no opposition, which allowed U.S. dive-bomber and torpedo aircraft to set up for their attacks unmolested. These aircraft—after a two-hour flight from Okinawa—arrived over the Yamato battle group and circled the ship formation just out of antiaircraft range; the lack of Japanese fighter resistance provided ample breathing room for American crews to methodically plan and co-ordinate their attack runs.

The first wave of U.S. carrier planes was spotted by a Japanese lookout on the bridge at 12:32. Two minutes later, Yamato opened fire with her 460 mm main batteries. The ships stopped zigzagging and increased speed to 24 kn (28 mph; 44 km/h), began taking evasive maneuvers, and opened fire with their antiaircraft (AA) guns. Yamato carried almost 150 AA guns, including her massive 460 mm main guns that fired San Shiki AA shells. The U.S. pilots deduced that the use of San Shiki and colored gunfire meant that Yamato's gunners relied on visual aiming and range, rather than being radar directed, and as a result "were missing with great consistency" despite the storm of fire that they put up.

The Hellcat and Corsair fighters "were supposed to go first, to strafe, to rocket, to drop light ordnance, distracting the enemy gunners, while the Helldivers plunged almost straight down with their heavy [armor piercing] bombs". This was because the Avenger torpedo bombers "needed all the distraction and diversion they could get when they made their dangerous low-altitude runs straight at the enemy ships." The Avengers mainly attacked from the port side so that torpedoes hitting that side would increase the likelihood of the target ship capsizing.

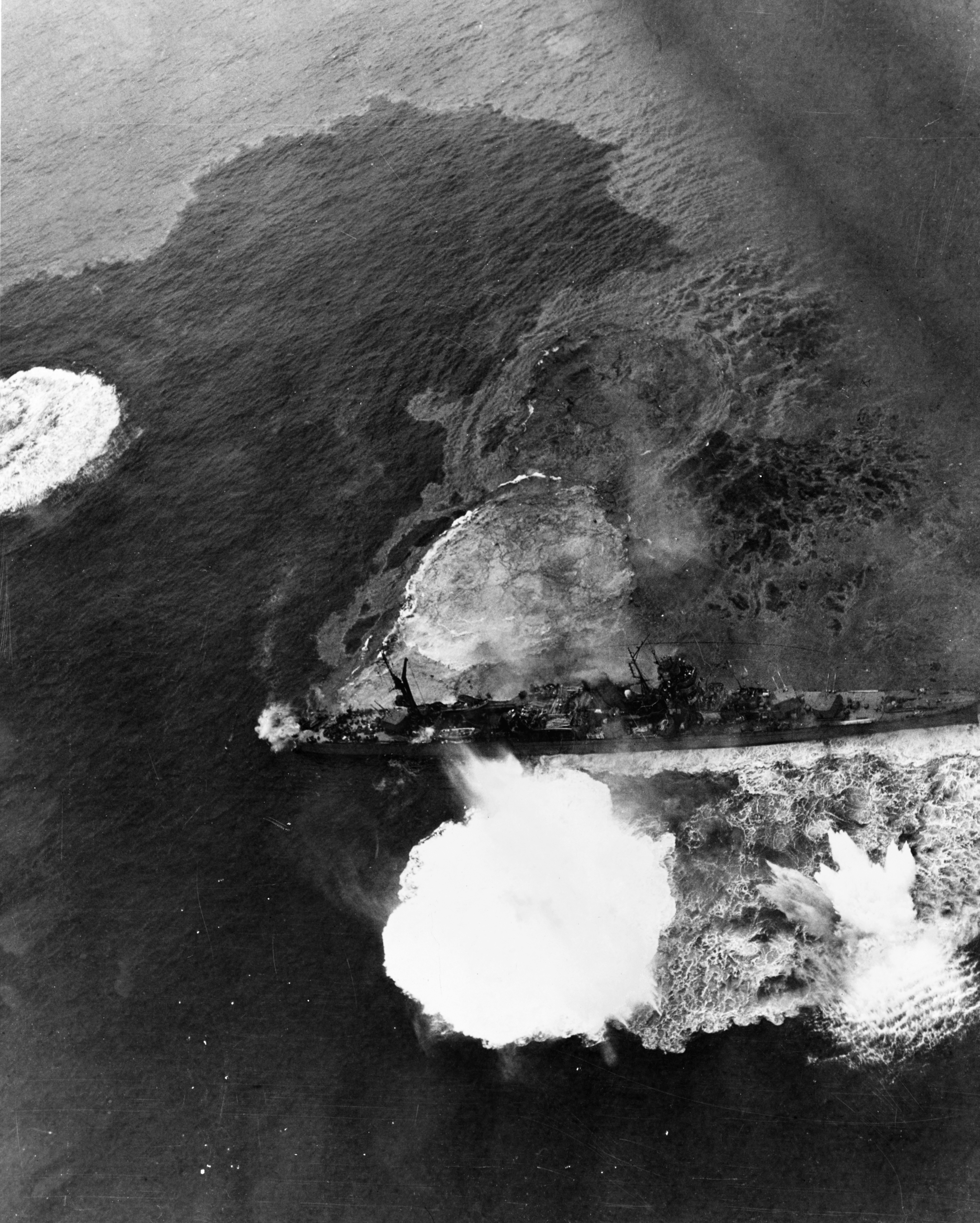
Yahagi under intense bomb and torpedo attacks

At 12:46, a torpedo hit Yahagi directly in her engine room, killing the entire engineering room crew and bringing her to a complete stop. Yahagi was hit by at least six more torpedoes and 12 bombs by succeeding waves of air attacks. The destroyer Isokaze attempted to come to Yahagi's aid, but was attacked and heavily damaged and was scuttled sometime later. Yahagi capsized and sank at 14:05.

During the first attack wave, despite evasive maneuvers that caused most of the bombs and torpedoes aimed at her to miss, Yamato was hit by two armor-piercing bombs and one torpedo. Her speed was not affected, but one of the bombs started a fire aft of the superstructure that was not extinguished. Also, during the first attack wave, destroyers Hamakaze and Suzutsuki were heavily damaged and taken out of the battle. Hamakaze sank later.

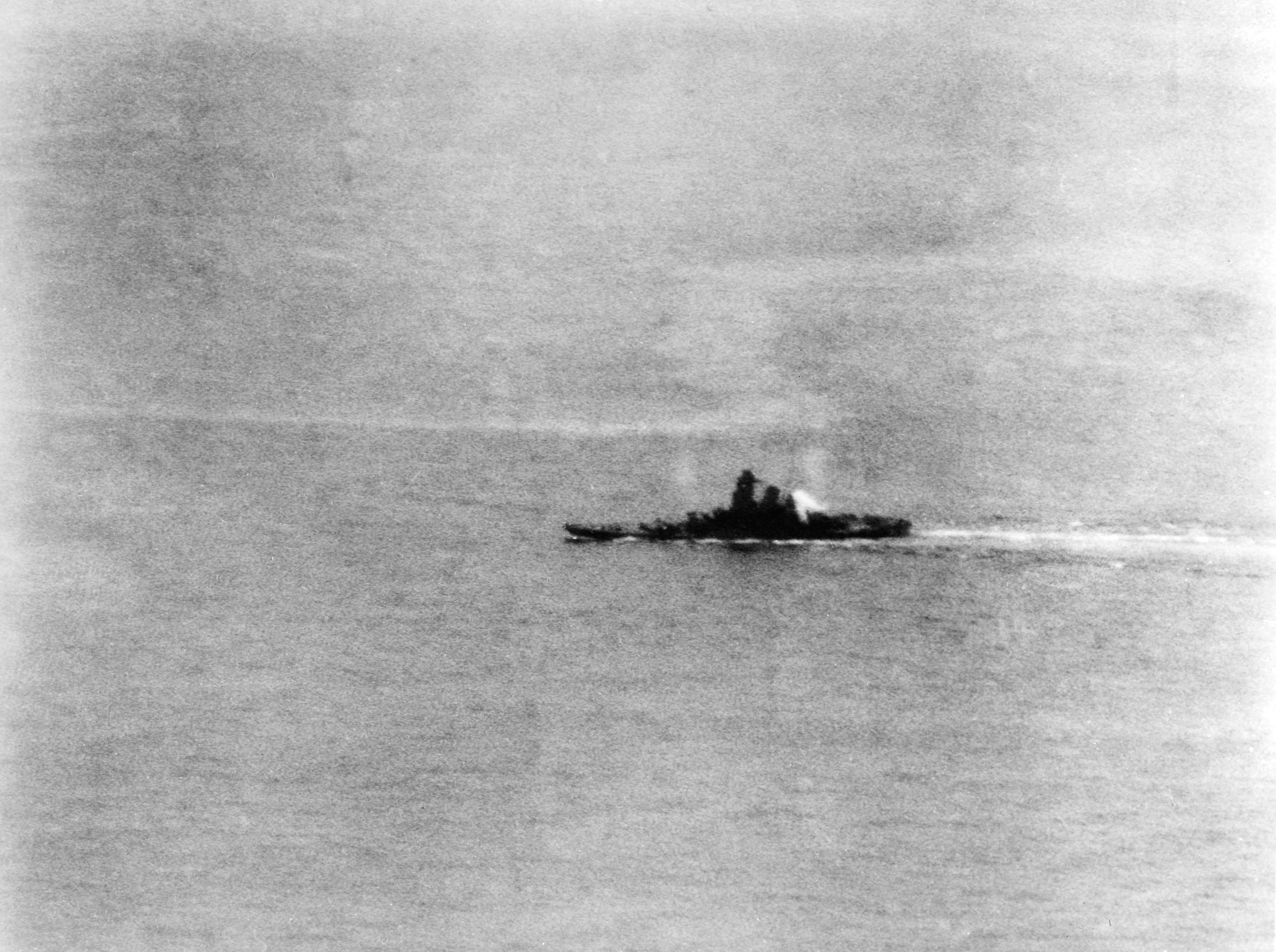
Yamato listing to port and on fire

Between 13:20 and 14:15, the second and third waves of U.S. aircraft attacked, concentrating on Yamato. During this time, Yamato was hit by at least eight torpedoes and up to 15 bombs. The bombs did extensive damage to the topside of the ship, including knocking out power to the gun directors and forcing the AA guns to be individually and manually aimed and fired, greatly reducing their effectiveness. The torpedo hits—almost all on the port side—caused Yamato to list enough that capsizing was an imminent danger.

At 13:33, in a desperate attempt to keep the ship from capsizing, Yamato's damage-control team counter-flooded both starboard engine and boiler rooms. This narrowly mitigated the imminent danger of capsizing, but also drowned the several hundred crew members crewing those stations, who were given no notice that their compartments were about to fill with water. The loss of the starboard engines, plus the weight of the water, caused Yamato to slow to about 10 kn (12 mph; 19 km/h). At that same moment, another 110 aircraft were launched from Task Group 58. Twenty Avengers made a torpedo run from 60° to port. Yamato started a sharp turn to port, but three torpedoes ripped into her port side amidships, jamming her auxiliary rudder in position hard port.

With Yamato proceeding more slowly, so being more accessible to target, U.S. torpedo aircraft concentrated on hitting her rudder and stern with torpedoes to affect her steering ability, which they succeeded in doing. At 14:02, after being informed that the ship could no longer steer and was sinking, Itō ordered the mission canceled, the crew to abandon the ship, and the remaining ships to begin rescuing survivors. Yamato communicated this message to the other surviving ships by signal flag because her radios had been destroyed.

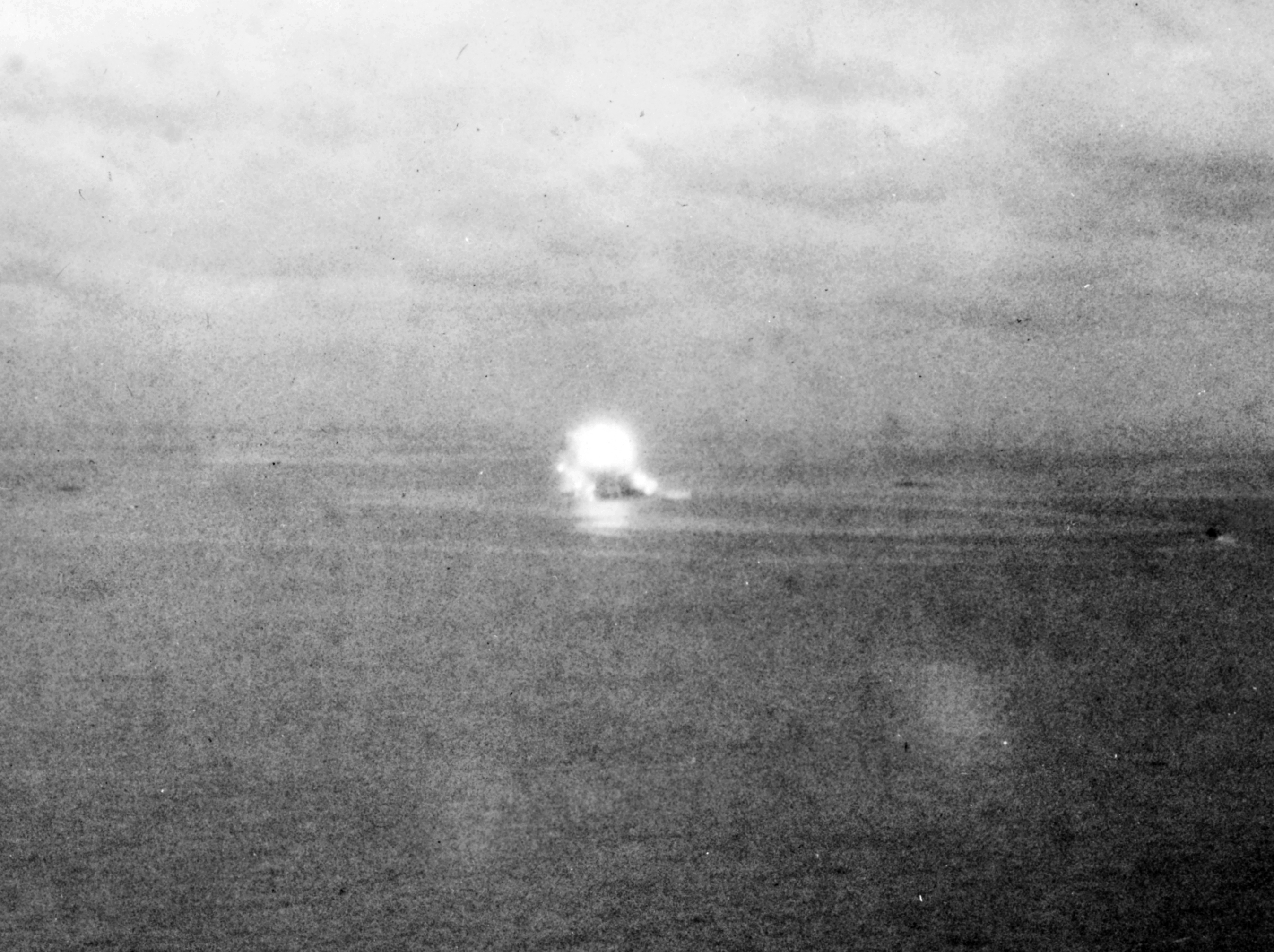
Only known photo of Yamato exploding

Vice Admiral Seiichi Itō, along with Captain Kōsaku Aruga, who commanded Yamato for the battle, refused to abandon ship, with Itō retiring to the flag cabin, while Aruga tied himself to the binnacle. As the order to abandon the ship was issued after the ship began to capsize, many of her crew were trapped. American aircraft continued to attack Yamato during this period, and she suffered several more torpedo hits. At 14:20, Yamato capsized completely and began to sink (30°22′N 128°04′E). At 14:23, she suddenly blew up with an explosion so large that it was reportedly heard and seen 200 km (110 nmi; 120 mi) away in Kagoshima and sent up a mushroom-shaped cloud almost 20,000 ft (6,100 m) into the air. Japanese survivor Mitsuru Yoshida said that her large explosion downed several U.S. planes observing her end. The explosion is believed to have occurred when the fires ignited by bomb hits reached the main magazines.

Attempting to make it back to port, the destroyer Asashimo was bombed and sunk with no survivors. The destroyer Kasumi was also crippled and had to be scuttled by other, relatively undamaged destroyers. Suzutsuki was able to make it to Sasebo, Japan, despite her bow being blown off, by steaming in reverse the entire way.

The remaining three less-damaged destroyers (Fuyutsuki, Yukikaze, and Hatsushimo) were able to rescue 280 survivors from Yamato (sources differ on the size of Yamato's crew, giving it as between 2,750 and 3,300 men), plus 555 survivors from Yahagi (out of a crew of 1,000) and just over 800 survivors from Isokaze, Hamakaze, and Kasumi. Between 3,700 and 4,250 Japanese naval personnel perished in the battle. The ships took the survivors to Sasebo.

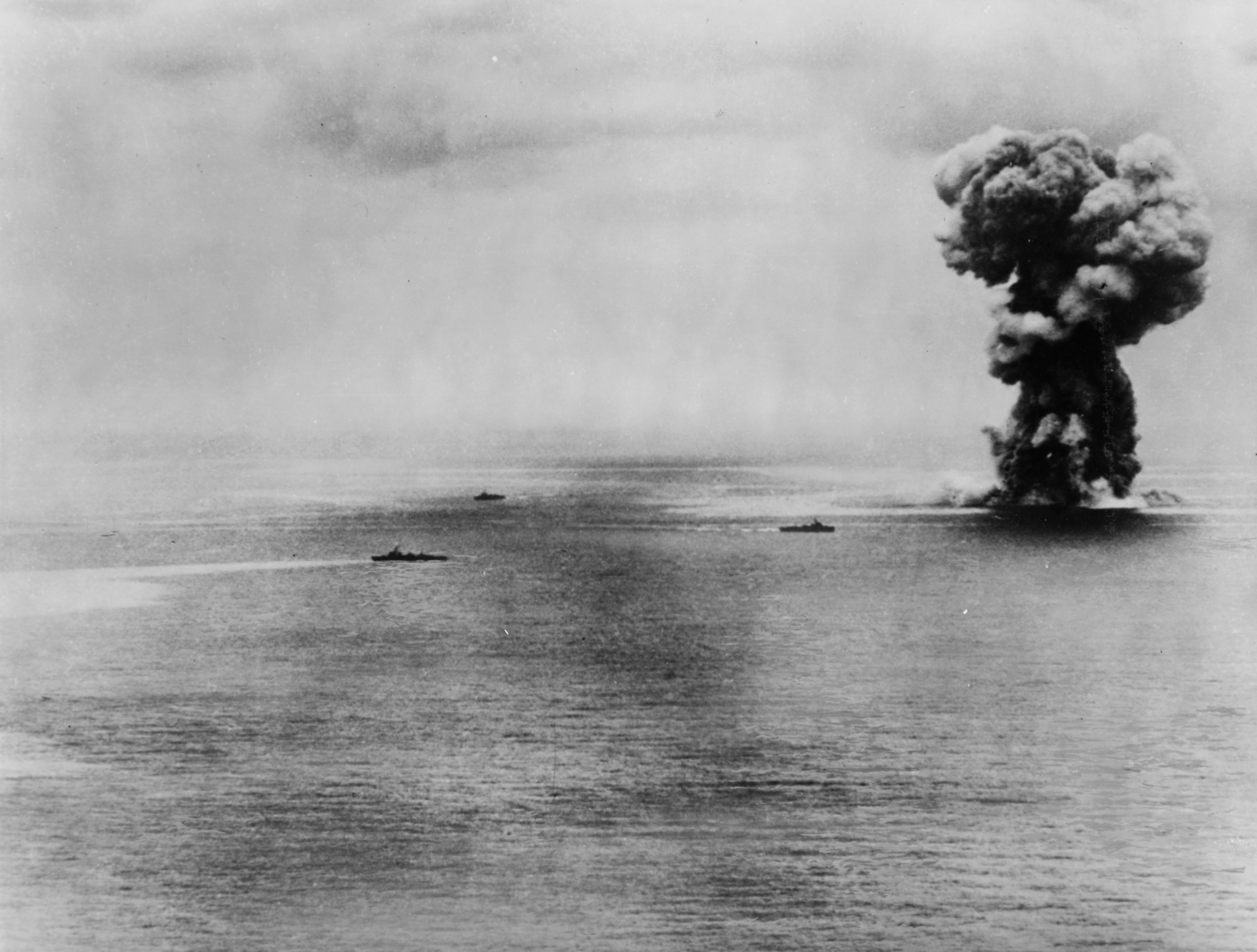
Yamato moments after the explosion. Visible in the left foreground is Suzutsuki, steaming in reverse with a damaged bow.

In total, 10 U.S. aircraft were shot down by AA fire from the Japanese ships; some aircrews were rescued by seaplane or submarine. The U.S. lost 12 men. Some of the Japanese survivors reported that U.S. fighter aircraft strafed Japanese survivors floating in the water. Other Japanese survivors reported that U.S. aircraft temporarily halted their attacks on the destroyers during the time that the destroyers were busy picking up survivors from the water.

== Aerial kamikaze attacks ==
Besides Operation Kikusui I, Operation Ten-Go also involved numerous suicide attacks on the U.S. invasion forces. The Japanese Army conducted an air attack on the U.S. naval fleet at Okinawa, but they failed to sink any ships. Around 115 aircraft—many of them kamikaze—attacked the U.S. ships throughout 7 April. Kamikaze aircraft hit the aircraft carrier Hancock, battleship Maryland, and destroyer Bennett, causing moderate damage to Hancock and Maryland and severe damage to Bennett. About 100 Japanese aircraft were lost in the attack.

== Aftermath ==
Kikusui I was the last major Japanese naval operation of the war, and the remaining Japanese warships had little involvement in combat operations for the rest of the conflict. Suzutsuki was never repaired. Fuyutsuki was repaired but hit a U.S. air-dropped mine at Moji, Japan, on 20 August 1945, and was not subsequently repaired. Yukikaze survived the war almost undamaged. Hatsushimo hit a U.S. air-dropped mine on 30 July 1945, near Maizuru, Japan, and was the 129th, and last, Japanese destroyer sunk in the war.

Okinawa was declared secure by Allied forces on 21 June 1945, after an intense and costly battle. Japan surrendered on 15 August 1945 after the atomic bombings of Hiroshima and Nagasaki and the USSR launching an invasion of northern China and Korea. The apparent willingness of Japan to sacrifice so many of its people using suicidal tactics such as Operation Ten-Go and in the Battle of Okinawa was reportedly a factor in the American decision to employ atomic weapons against Japan. Maryland was repaired and upgraded following the kamikaze attacks from Operation Ten-Go, although the war ended right after she returned to service.

Yamato remains fairly prominent in modern Japanese culture, where she is often portrayed as a symbol of Japanese nationalism. Academic Robert Farley has written that popular depictions of the battleship portray her destruction as a "heroic, but also pointless and futile, sacrifice". One of the reasons the event may have such significance in Japanese culture is that the word Yamato is often used as a poetic name for Japan. Thus, the end of the battleship Yamato could serve as a metaphor for the end of the Japanese empire, amidst her allegorical greatest might.

== Bibliography ==
- Abe, S. (1994). 特攻大和艦隊 [Special Attack Fleet Yamato] (in Japanese). Shinjuku: Tatsumi Publishing Co. ISBN 978-4-87602-211-3.
- Cleaver, Thomas McKelvey (2018). Tidal Wave: From Leyte Gulf to Tokyo Bay. Oxford: Bloomsbury Publishing. ISBN 978-1-4728-2546-9.
- Feifer, G. (2001). "Operation Heaven Number One". The Battle of Okinawa: The Blood and the Bomb. The Lyons Press. ISBN 1-58574-215-5.
- Garzke, W. H.; Dulin, R. O. (1985). Battleships: Axis and Neutral Battleships in World War II. Annapolis: Naval Institute Press. ISBN 0-87021-101-3.
- Hara, Tameichi (1961). "The Last Sortie". Japanese Destroyer Captain. New York & Toronto: Ballantine Books. ISBN 0-345-27894-1.
- Jentschura, Hansgeorg; Jung, Dieter; Mickel, Peter (1977). Warships of the Imperial Japanese Navy, 1869–1945. Annapolis: United States Naval Institute. ISBN 0-87021-893-X.
- Morison, Samuel Eliot (1960). Victory in the Pacific. History of United States Naval Operations in World War II. Vol. XIV. Boston: Little, Brown and Company. OCLC 7649498.
- Potter, E. B. (2016). Triumph in the Pacific; The Navy's Struggle Against Japan. Verdun Press. ISBN 978-1-78720-013-5.
- Prados, John (1995). Combined Fleet Decoded: The Secret History of American Intelligence and the Japanese Navy in World War II. New York City: Random House. ISBN 0-679-43701-0.
- Skulski, J. (1989). The Battleship Yamato. Annapolis: Naval Institute Press. ISBN 0-87021-019-X.
- Spurr, R. (1995). A Glorious Way to Die. Newmarket Press. ISBN 1-55704-248-9.
- Yoshida, M.; Minear, R. H. (1999). Requiem for Battleship Yamato. Annapolis, Maryland: Naval Institute Press. ISBN 1-55750-544-6.
