= List of battleships =

The list of battleships includes all battleships built between the late 1880s and 1946, beginning roughly with the first pre-dreadnought battleships, which are usually defined as the British Royal Sovereign class or Majestic class. Dreadnoughts and fast battleships are also included. Earlier armored capital ships (built between the 1850s and 1880s) are found at the list of ironclads, along with the list included at coastal defence ship.

Cancelled ships that began construction are included, but projects that were not laid down, such as the French Lyon class, or were purely design studies, like the German L 20e α-class, are not included.

== Key ==
Key
This color indicates ships that were cancelled
This color indicates ships that were converted to another ship type

== List ==
Name	Launched	Class	Type	Operator	Fate
Africa	1904-05-20	King Edward VII class	Semi-dreadnought	Royal Navy	Broken up, 1920
Agamemnon	1906-06-23	Lord Nelson class	Semi-dreadnought	Royal Navy	Broken up, 1927
Agincourt	1913-01-22		Dreadnought	Royal Navy	Ex-Ottoman Sultân Osmân-ı Evvel, former Brazilian Rio de Janeiro, seized near completion, 31 July 1914
Ajax	1912-03-21	King George V class (1911)	Super-dreadnought	Royal Navy	Broken up, 1926
Aki	1907-04-15	Satsuma class	Semi-dreadnought	Imperial Japanese Navy	Sunk as target, 2 September 1924
Alabama (BB-8)	1898-05-18	Illinois class	Pre-dreadnought	United States Navy	Broken up, 1924
Alabama (BB-60)	1942-02-16	South Dakota class	Fast battleship	United States Navy	Museum ship at Battleship Memorial Park in Mobile Bay
Albemarle	1901-03-05	Duncan class	Pre-dreadnought	Royal Navy	Broken up, 1919
Albion	1898-06-21	Canopus class	Pre-dreadnought	Royal Navy	Broken up, 1919
Alfonso XIII	1913-05-07	España class	Dreadnought	Spanish Navy	Sunk by mines, 30 April 1937
Almirante Cochrane	1918-06-08	Almirante Latorre class	Super-dreadnought	Chilean Navy	Sold incomplete to UK, converted to aircraft carrier, sunk during operation pedestal in 1942 Eagle
Almirante Latorre	1913-11-17	Almirante Latorre class	Super-dreadnought	Chilean Navy	Sold incomplete to UK, 9 September 1914, renamed Canada; repurchased as Almirante Latorre, April 1920; broken up, 1959
Ammiraglio di Saint Bon	1897-04-29	Ammiraglio di Saint Bon class	Pre-dreadnought	Regia Marina	Broken up, 1920
Andrea Doria	1913-03-30	Andrea Doria class	Dreadnought	Regia Marina	Broken up, 1956
Andrei Pervozvanny	1906-10-20	Andrei Pervozvanny class	Semi-dreadnought	Imperial Russian Navy	Broken up, 1925
Anson	1940-02-24	King George V class (1939)	Fast battleship	Royal Navy	Ex-Jellicoe scarpped in 1957
Arizona	1915-06-19	Pennsylvania class	Super-dreadnought	United States Navy	Sunk at Pearl Harbor, 1941
Arkansas	1911-01-14	Wyoming class	Dreadnought	United States Navy	Sunk at Bikini Atoll in nuclear weapons test Operation Crossroads, 1946
Árpád	1901-09-11	Habsburg class	Pre-dreadnought	Austro-Hungarian Navy	Awarded to UK 1920, scrapped 1921
Asahi	1899-03-13		Pre-dreadnought	Imperial Japanese Navy	Sunk by USS Salmon, 25 May 1942
Audacious	1912-09-14	King George V class (1911)	Super-dreadnought	Royal Navy	Mined and sunk, 27 October 1914
Babenberg	1902-10-04	Habsburg class	Pre-dreadnought	Austro-Hungarian Navy	Awarded to UK 1920, scrapped 1921
Baden	1915-10-30	Bayern class	Super-dreadnought	Imperial German Navy	Beached in Scapa Flow, 21 June 1919; sunk as target off Portsmouth, 16 August 1921
Barfleur	1892-08-10	Centurion class	Pre-dreadnought	Royal Navy	Broken up, 1910
Barham	1914-10-31	Queen Elizabeth class	Super-dreadnought	Royal Navy	Sunk by German U-331 off Egyptian coast, 25 November 1941 – sinking was filmed
Bayern	1915-02-18	Bayern class	Super-dreadnought	Imperial German Navy	Scuttled in Scapa Flow, 21 June 1919; raised for scrap, 1934
Béarn	1920-04-15	Normandie class	Super-dreadnought	French Navy	Converted to aircraft carrier
Bellerophon	1907-07-27	Bellerophon class	Dreadnought	Royal Navy	Broken up, 1921
Benbow	1913-11-12	Iron Duke class	Super-dreadnought	Royal Navy	
Benedetto Brin	1901-11-07	Regina Margherita class	Pre-dreadnought	Regia Marina	Destroyed by internal explosion, 27 September 1915
Bismarck	1939-02-14	Bismarck class	Fast battleship	Kriegsmarine	Sunk, 27 May 1941
Borodino	1901-09-08	Borodino class	Pre-dreadnought	Imperial Russian Navy	Sunk at the Battle of Tsushima, 27 May 1905
Bouvet	1896-04-27		Pre-dreadnought	French Navy	Sunk by mines, 18 March 1915
Brandenburg	1891-09-21	Brandenburg class	Pre-dreadnought	Imperial German Navy	Broken up, 1919
Braunschweig	1902-12-20	Braunschweig class	Pre-dreadnought	Imperial German Navy	Broken up, 1931
Brennus	1891-10-17		Pre-dreadnought	French Navy	Broken up, 1922
Bretagne	1913-04-21	Bretagne class	Super-dreadnought	French Navy	Sunk by British forces during the Attack on Mers-el-Kébir, 3 July 1940
Britannia	1904-12-10	King Edward VII class	Semi-dreadnought	Royal Navy	Torpedoed by German UB-50 off Cape Trafalgar, 9 November 1918
Bulwark	1899-10-18	London class	Pre-dreadnought	Royal Navy	Blew up at Sheerness, 26 November 1914
Caesar	1896-09-02	Majestic class	Pre-dreadnought	Royal Navy	Broken up, 1921
California	1919-11-20	Tennessee class	Super-dreadnought	United States Navy	Broken up, 1959
Canopus	1897-10-12	Canopus class	Pre-dreadnought	Royal Navy	Broken up, 1920
Carnot	1894-07-12		Pre-dreadnought	French Navy	Broken up, 1922
Centurion (1892)	1892-08-03	Centurion class	Pre-dreadnought	Royal Navy	Broken up, 1910
Centurion (1911)	1911-11-18	King George V class (1911)	Super-dreadnought	Royal Navy	Scuttled as Mulberry harbour blockship off Normandy, 9 June 1944
Charlemagne	1895-10-17	Charlemagne class	Pre-dreadnought	French Navy	Broken up, 1920
Charles Martel	1893-08-29		Pre-dreadnought	French Navy	
Clemenceau	Cancelled	Richelieu class	Fast battleship	French Navy	Cancelled, 1940; broken up, 1951
Collingwood	1908-11-07	St. Vincent class	Dreadnought	Royal Navy	Broken up, 1922
Colorado	1921-03-22	Colorado class	Super-dreadnought	United States Navy	Broken up, 1959
Colossus	1910-04-09	Colossus class	Dreadnought	Royal Navy	Broken up, 1928
Commonwealth	1903-05-13	King Edward VII class	Semi-dreadnought	Royal Navy	Broken up, 1921
Condorcet	1909-04-19	Danton class	Semi-dreadnought	French Navy	Broken up, 1945
Connecticut	1904-09-29	Connecticut class	Semi-dreadnought	United States Navy	Broken up, 1923
Conqueror	1911-05-01	Orion class	Super-dreadnought	Royal Navy	Broken up, 1922
Conte di Cavour	1911-08-10	Conte di Cavour class	Dreadnought	Regia Marina	Broken up, 1947
Cornwallis	1901-07-13	Duncan class	Pre-dreadnought	Royal Navy	Sunk by German U-32, 9 January 1917
Courbet	1911-09-23	Courbet class	Dreadnought	French Navy	Scuttled as breakwater off Sword Beach, 9 June 1944, during Operation Neptune, scrapped in situ
Dante Alighieri	1910-08-20		Dreadnought	Regia Marina	Broken up, 1928
Danton	1909-07-04	Danton class	Semi-dreadnought	French Navy	Sunk by U-64, 1917
Delaware	1909-02-06	Delaware class	Dreadnought	United States Navy	Broken up, 1924
Démocratie	1904-04-30	Liberté class	Pre-dreadnought	French Navy	Broken up, 1921
Deutschland	1904-11-19	Deutschland class	Pre-dreadnought	Imperial German Navy	Broken up, 1920
Diderot	1909-04-20	Danton class	Semi-dreadnought	French Navy	Broken up, 1937
Dominion	1903-08-25	King Edward VII class	Semi-dreadnought	Royal Navy	Broken up, 1921
Dreadnought	1906-02-10		Dreadnought	Royal Navy	Broken up, 1921
Duilio	1913-04-24	Andrea Doria class	Dreadnought	Regia Marina	Broken up, 1956
Duke of York	1940-02-28	King George V class (1939)	Fast battleship	Royal Navy	Broken up, 1957
Duncan	1901-03-21	Duncan class	Pre-dreadnought	Royal Navy	Broken up, 1920
Dunkerque	1935-10-02	Dunkerque class	Fast battleship	French Navy	Scuttled at Toulon, 27 November 1942; broken up, 1955
Dvenadsat Apostolov	1890-09-13		Pre-dreadnought	Imperial Russian Navy	Broken up, 1931
Elsass	1903-05-26	Braunschweig class	Pre-dreadnought	Imperial German Navy	Broken up, 1936
Emanuele Filiberto	1897-09-29	Ammiraglio di Saint Bon class	Pre-dreadnought	Regia Marina	Broken up, 1920
Emperor of India	1913-11-27	Iron Duke class	Super-dreadnought	Royal Navy	Sunk as gunnery target on Owers Bank, 10–11 June 1931, raised and scrapped
Empress of India	1891-05-07	Royal Sovereign class	Pre-dreadnought	Royal Navy	Sunk as gunnery target off Portland, 4 November 1913
Erin	1913-09-03	Reşadiye class	Super-dreadnought	Royal Navy	Ex-Ottoman Reşadiye, seized near completion, 31 July 1914
Erzherzog Ferdinand Max	1905-05-21	Erzherzog Karl class	Pre-dreadnought	Austro-Hungarian Navy	Awarded to UK, broken up, 1920
Erzherzog Franz Ferdinand	1908-09-30	Radetzky class	Semi-dreadnought	Austro-Hungarian Navy	Broken up, 1926
Erzherzog Friedrich	1904-04-30	Erzherzog Karl class	Pre-dreadnought	Austro-Hungarian Navy	Awarded to France, scrapped 1920
Erzherzog Karl	1903-10-04	Erzherzog Karl class	Pre-dreadnought	Austro-Hungarian Navy	Awarded to France, broken up, 1920
España	1912-02-05	España class	Dreadnought	Spanish Navy	Wrecked off Cape Tres Forcas, 26 August 1923
Evstafi	1906-11-03	Evstafi class	Pre-dreadnought	Imperial Russian Navy	Broken up, 1922
Exmouth	1901-08-31	Duncan class	Pre-dreadnought	Royal Navy	Broken up, 1920
Fatih Sultan Mehmed	Cancelled	Reşadiye class	Super-dreadnought	Ottoman Navy	Broken up on the slipway, 1914
Flandre	1914-10-20	Normandie class	Super-dreadnought	French Navy	Cancelled; broken up, 1924
Florida	1910-05-12	Florida class	Dreadnought	United States Navy	Broken up, 1931
Formidable	1898-11-17	Formidable class	Pre-dreadnought	Royal Navy	Sunk by German U-24 off Portland, 1 January 1915
France	1912-11-07	Courbet class	Dreadnought	French Navy	Wrecked, 1922; broken up between 1935 and 1958
Friedrich der Grosse	1911-06-10	Kaiser class	Dreadnought	Imperial German Navy	Scuttled in Scapa Flow, 21 June 1919; raised for scrap, 1936
Fuji	1896-03-31	Fuji class	Pre-dreadnought	Imperial Japanese Navy	Broken up, 1948
Fusō	1914-03-28	Fusō class	Super-dreadnought	Imperial Japanese Navy	Sunk during Battle of Leyte Gulf, 25 October 1944
Gangut	1911-10-07	Gangut class	Dreadnought	Imperial Russian Navy	Broken up, 1957
Gascogne	1914-09-20	Normandie class	Super-dreadnought	French Navy	Cancelled; broken up, 1924
Gaulois	1896-10-06	Charlemagne class	Pre-dreadnought	French Navy	Sunk by UB-47, 27 December 1916
Georgia	1904-10-11	Virginia class	Pre-dreadnought	United States Navy	Broken up, 1923
Giulio Cesare	1911-10-15	Conte di Cavour class	Dreadnought	Regia Marina	Sunk, 29 October 1955
Glory	1899-03-11	Canopus class	Pre-dreadnought	Royal Navy	Broken up, 1922
Gneisenau	1936-12-08	Scharnhorst class	Fast battleship	Kriegsmarine	Sunk as blockship at Gotenhafen, 23 March 1945
Goliath	1898-03-23	Canopus class	Pre-dreadnought	Royal Navy	Sunk by Ottoman destroyer Muâvenet-i Millîye, 5 May 1915
Grosser Kurfürst	1913-05-05	König class	Dreadnought	Imperial German Navy	Scuttled in Scapa Flow, 21 June 1919, raised for scrap 1938
Habsburg	1900-09-09	Habsburg class	Pre-dreadnought	Austro-Hungarian Navy	Awarded to UK 1920, scrapped 1921
Hannibal	1896-04-28	Majestic class	Pre-dreadnought	Royal Navy	Broken up, 1920
Hannover	1905-09-29	Deutschland class	Pre-dreadnought	Imperial German Navy	Broken up, 1944
Hatsuse	1899-06-27	Shikishima class	Pre-dreadnought	Imperial Japanese Navy	Mined and sunk, 15 May 1904
Helgoland	1909-09-25	Helgoland class	Dreadnought	Imperial German Navy	Surrendered to UK 1920, broken up, 1921
Hercules	1910-05-10	Colossus class	Dreadnought	Royal Navy	Broken up, 1921
Hessen	1903-09-18	Braunschweig class	Pre-dreadnought	Imperial German Navy	Broken up, 1960
Hibernia	1905-06-17	King Edward VII class	Semi-dreadnought	Royal Navy	Broken up, 1921
Hindustan	1903-12-19	King Edward VII class	Semi-dreadnought	Royal Navy	Broken up, 1921
Hood	1891-07-30	Royal Sovereign class (modified)	Pre-dreadnought	Royal Navy	Sunk as a blockship in Portland harbour, 4 November 1914
Howe	1940-04-09	King George V class (1939)	Fast battleship	Royal Navy	
Hyūga	1917-01-27	Ise class	Super-dreadnought	Imperial Japanese Navy	Sunk, 24 July 1945
Idaho (BB-24)	1905-12-09	Mississippi class	Pre-dreadnought	United States Navy	Sold to Greece, 1914; sunk, 1941
Idaho (BB-42)	1917-06-20	New Mexico class	Super-dreadnought	United States Navy	Broken up, 1947
Iéna	1898-09-1		Pre-dreadnought	French Navy	Destroyed by magazine explosion, 1907
Illinois (BB-7)	1898-10-04	Illinois class	Pre-dreadnought	United States Navy	Broken up, 1956
Illinois (BB-65)	Cancelled	Iowa class	Fast battleship	United States Navy	Laid down 6 December 1942, cancelled before launch
Illustrious	1896-09-17	Majestic class	Pre-dreadnought	Royal Navy	Broken up, 1920
Imperatritsa Ekaterina Velikaya	1914-06-06	Imperatritsa Mariya class	Dreadnought	Imperial Russian Navy	Sunk, 18 June 1918
Imperatritsa Mariya	1913-11-01	Imperatritsa Mariya class	Dreadnought	Imperial Russian Navy	Sunk, 20 October 1916
Imperator Aleksandr III (1901)	1901-08-03	Borodino class	Pre-dreadnought	Imperial Russian Navy	Sunk at the Battle of Tsushima, 27 May 1905
Imperator Aleksandr III (1914)	1914-04-15	Imperatritsa Mariya class	Dreadnought	Imperial Russian Navy	Broken up, 1924
Imperator Nikolai I	1916-10-18		Dreadnought	Imperial Russian Navy	Cancelled before completion; broken up, 1923
Imperator Pavel I	1907-09-07	Andrei Pervozvanny class	Pre-dreadnought	Imperial Russian Navy	Broken up, 1923
Impero	1939-11-15	Littorio class	Fast battleship	Regia Marina	Not completed; broken up, 1948
Implacable	1899-03-11	Formidable class	Pre-dreadnought	Royal Navy	Broken up, 1921
Indiana (BB-1)	1893-02-28	Indiana class	Pre-dreadnought	United States Navy	Sunk as a target, 1 November 1920
Indiana (BB-58)	1941-11-21	South Dakota class	Fast battleship	United States Navy	Broken up 1963, parts preserved in namesake state
Ioann Zlatoust	1906-05-	Evstafi class	Pre-dreadnought	Imperial Russian Navy	Broken up, 1922
Iowa (BB-4)	1896-03-28		Pre-dreadnought	United States Navy	Sunk as a target, 23 March 1923
Iowa (BB-61)	1942-08-27	Iowa class	Fast battleship	United States Navy	Museum ship at the Pacific Battleship Center in the Port of Los Angeles
Iron Duke	1912-10-12	Iron Duke class	Super-dreadnought	Royal Navy	Flagship of Grand Fleet at the Battle of Jutland
Irresistible	1898-12-15	Formidable class	Pre-dreadnought	Royal Navy	Mined at the Dardanelles, 18 March 1915
Ise	1916-11-12	Ise class	Super-dreadnought	Imperial Japanese Navy	Sunk, 28 July 1945
Jaime I	1914-09-21	España class	Dreadnought	Spanish Navy	Destroyed by internal explosion, 17 June 1937
Jauréguiberry	1893-10-27		Pre-dreadnought	French Navy	Broken up, 1934
Jean Bart (1911)	1911-09-22	Courbet class	Dreadnought	French Navy	Broken up, 1945
Jean Bart (1940)	1940-03-06	Richelieu class	Fast battleship	French Navy	Broken up, 1970
Jupiter	1895-11-18	Majestic class	Pre-dreadnought	Royal Navy	Broken up, 1920
Justice	1904-10-27	Liberté class	Pre-dreadnought	French Navy	Broken up, 1922
Kaga	1921-11-17	Tosa class	Super-dreadnought	Imperial Japanese Navy	Cancelled under terms of Washington Naval Treaty 1922; converted to aircraft carrier; sunk during Battle of Midway, 4 June 1942
Kaiser	1911-03-22	Kaiser class	Dreadnought	Imperial German Navy	Scuttled in Scapa Flow, 21 June 1919, raised for scrap 1929
Kaiser Barbarossa	1900-04-21	Kaiser Friedrich III class	Pre-dreadnought	Imperial German Navy	Broken up, 1920
Kaiser Friedrich III	1896-07-01	Kaiser Friedrich III class	Pre-dreadnought	Imperial German Navy	Broken up, 1920
Kaiser Karl der Grosse	1899-10-18	Kaiser Friedrich III class	Pre-dreadnought	Imperial German Navy	Broken up, 1920
Kaiser Wilhelm II	1897-09-14	Kaiser Friedrich III class	Pre-dreadnought	Imperial German Navy	Broken up, 1922
Kaiser Wilhelm der Grosse	1899-06-01	Kaiser Friedrich III class	Pre-dreadnought	Imperial German Navy	Broken up, 1920
Kaiserin	1911-11-11	Kaiser class	Dreadnought	Imperial German Navy	Scuttled in Scapa Flow, 21 June 1919, raised for scrap 1936
Kansas	1905-0812	Connecticut class	Pre-dreadnought	United States Navy	Broken up, 1923
Kashima	1905-03-22	Katori class	Pre-dreadnought	Imperial Japanese Navy	Broken up, 1924
Katori	1905-07-04	Katori class	Pre-dreadnought	Imperial Japanese Navy	Broken up, 1924
Kawachi	1910-10-15	Kawachi class	Dreadnought	Imperial Japanese Navy	Destroyed by magazine explosion, 12 July 1918
Kearsarge	1898-03-24	Kearsarge class	Pre-dreadnought	United States Navy	Converted to crane ship, 1920; broken up, 1955
Kentucky (BB-6)	1898-03-24	Kearsarge class	Pre-dreadnought	United States Navy	Broken up, 1923
Kentucky (BB-66)	Cancelled	Iowa class	Fast battleship	United States Navy	Laid down 7 March 1942, cancelled before launch
King Edward VII	1903-07-23	King Edward VII class	Semi-dreadnought	Royal Navy	Mined off Cape Wrath, 6 January 1916
King George V (1911)	1911-10-09	King George V class (1911)	Super-dreadnought	Royal Navy	Broken up, 1926
King George V (41)	1939-02-21	King George V class (1939)	Fast battleship	Royal Navy	Sold for scrap 1957
Knyaz Suvorov	1902-09-25	Borodino class	Pre-dreadnought	Imperial Russian Navy	Sunk at the Battle of Tsushima, 27 May 1905
König	1913-03-01	König class	Dreadnought	Imperial German Navy	Scuttled in Scapa Flow, 21 June 1919
König Albert	1912-04-27	Kaiser class	Dreadnought	Imperial German Navy	Scuttled in Scapa Flow, 21 June 1919, raised for scrap 1935
Kronprinz	1914-02-21	König class	Dreadnought	Imperial German Navy	Renamed Kronprinz Wilhelm 1918, scuttled in Scapa Flow, 21 June 1919
Kurfürst Friedrich Wilhelm	1891-06-30	Brandenburg class	Pre-dreadnought	Imperial German Navy	Sold to Turkey, 12 September 1910; renamed Barbaros Hayreddin; sunk by HMS E11, 8 August 1915
Languedoc	1916-05-01	Normandie class	Super-dreadnought	French Navy	Cancelled; broken up, 1929
Leonardo da Vinci	1911-10-14	Conte di Cavour class	Dreadnought	Regia Marina	Sunk, 2 August 1916
Liberté	1905-04-19	Liberté class	Pre-dreadnought	French Navy	Sunk by magazine explosion, 1911
Littorio	1937-08-22	Littorio class	Fast battleship	Regia Marina	Broken up, 1948
London	1899-09-21	London class	Pre-dreadnought	Royal Navy	Broken up, 1920
Lord Nelson	1906-09-04	Lord Nelson class	Semi-dreadnought	Royal Navy	Broken up, 1920
Lorraine	1913-09-30	Bretagne class	Super-dreadnought	French Navy	Broken up, 1954
Lothringen	1904-05-27	Braunschweig class	Pre-dreadnought	Imperial German Navy	Broken up, 1931
Louisiana	1904-08-27	Connecticut class	Pre-dreadnought	United States Navy	Broken up, 1923
Magnificent	1894-12-19	Majestic class	Pre-dreadnought	Royal Navy	Broken up, 1921
Maine	1901-7-27	Maine class	Pre-dreadnought	United States Navy	Broken up, 1922
Majestic	1895-01-31	Majestic class	Pre-dreadnought	Royal Navy	Torpedoed by German U-21 at the Dardanelles, 27 May 1915
Malaya	1915-03-18	Queen Elizabeth class	Super-dreadnought	Royal Navy	
Markgraf	1913-06-04	König class	Dreadnought	Imperial German Navy	Scuttled in Scapa Flow, 21 June 1919
Marlborough	1912-01-25	Iron Duke class	Super-dreadnought	Royal Navy	
Mars	1896-03-30	Majestic class	Pre-dreadnought	Royal Navy	Broken up, 1921
Maryland	1920-02-20	Colorado class	Super-dreadnought	United States Navy	Broken up, 1959
Massachusetts (BB-2)	1893-06-10	Indiana class	Pre-dreadnought	United States Navy	Sunk as a target, January 1921
Massachusetts (BB-59)	1941-09-23	South Dakota class	Fast battleship	United States Navy	Museum ship at Battleship Cove in Fall River, Massachusetts
Masséna	1895-07-24		Pre-dreadnought	French Navy	Sunk as a breakwater, 1915
Mecklenburg	1901-11-09	Wittelsbach class	Pre-dreadnought	Imperial German Navy	Broken up, 1920
Michigan	1908-07-11	South Carolina class	Dreadnought	United States Navy	Broken up, 1924
Mikasa	1900-11-08		Pre-dreadnought	Imperial Japanese Navy	Preserved as a museum ship
Minas Geraes	1908-09-10	Minas Geraes class	Dreadnought	Brazilian Navy	Broken up, 1953
Minnesota	1905-04-08	Connecticut class	Pre-dreadnought	United States Navy	Broken up, 1923
Mirabeau	1909-10-28	Danton class	Semi-dreadnought	French Navy	Broken up, 1928
Mississippi (BB-23)	1905-09-30	Mississippi class	Pre-dreadnought	United States Navy	Sold to Greece, 8 July 1914, sunk 1941
Mississippi (BB-41)	1917-01-25	New Mexico class	Super-dreadnought	United States Navy	Broken up, 1956
Missouri (BB-11)	1901-12-28	Maine class	Pre-dreadnought	United States Navy	Broken up, 1922
Missouri (BB-63)	1944-01-29	Iowa class	Fast battleship	United States Navy	Last battleship retired by the US Navy – museum ship at Pearl Harbor
Monarch	1911-03-30	Orion class	Super-dreadnought	Royal Navy	Broken up, 1925
Montagu	1901-03-05	Duncan class	Pre-dreadnought	Royal Navy	Wrecked on Lundy Island, 30 May 1906
Moreno	1911-09-23	Rivadavia class	Dreadnought	Argentine Navy	Broken up, 1956
Musashi	1940-11-01	Yamato class	Fast battleship	Imperial Japanese Navy	Sunk during Battle of Leyte Gulf, 24 October 1944
Mutsu	1920-05-31	Nagato class	Super-dreadnought	Imperial Japanese Navy	Destroyed by magazine explosion, 8 June 1943
Nagato	1919-11-09	Nagato class	Super-dreadnought	Imperial Japanese Navy	Sunk as target, 1946
Napoli	1905-09-10	Regina Elena class	Pre-dreadnought	Regia Marina	Broken up, 1926
Nassau	1908-03-07	Nassau class	Dreadnought	Imperial German Navy	Surrendered to Japan 1920, broken up, 1921
Navarin	1891-10-20		Pre-dreadnought	Imperial Russian Navy	Sunk at the Battle of Tsushima, 28 May 1905
Nebraska	1904-10-07	Virginia class	Pre-dreadnought	United States Navy	Broken up, 1923
Nelson	1925-09-03	Nelson class	Treaty battleship	Royal Navy	scrapped in 1949
Neptune	1909-09-30		Dreadnought	Royal Navy	Broken up, 1922
Nevada	1914-07-11	Nevada class	Super-dreadnought	United States Navy	Sunk as a target, 1948
New Hampshire	1906-06-30	Connecticut class	Pre-dreadnought	United States Navy	Broken up, 1923
New Jersey (BB-16)	1904-11-10	Virginia class	Pre-dreadnought	United States Navy	Sunk as a target, 1923
New Jersey (BB-62)	1942-12-07	Iowa class	Fast battleship	United States Navy	Museum ship in Camden, New Jersey
New Mexico	1917-04-23	New Mexico class	Super-dreadnought	United States Navy	Broken up, 1947
New York	1912-10-30	New York class	Super-dreadnought	United States Navy	Sunk as a target, 1948
New Zealand	1904-02-04	King Edward VII class	Semi-dreadnought	Royal Navy	Renamed Zealandia 1911, broken up, 1921
Normandie	1914-10-19	Normandie class	Super-dreadnought	French Navy	Cancelled; broken up, 1925
North Carolina	1940-06-13	North Carolina class	Fast battleship	United States Navy	Museum ship in Wilmington, North Carolina
North Dakota	1908-11-10	Delaware class	Dreadnought	United States Navy	Broken up, 1931
Ocean	1898-07-05	Canopus class	Pre-dreadnought	Royal Navy	Mined in Morto Bay off Cape Helles, 18 March 1915
Ohio	1901-5-18	Maine class	Pre-dreadnought	United States Navy	Broken up, 1923
Oklahoma	1914-03-23	Nevada class	Super-dreadnought	United States Navy	Sunk at Pearl Harbor, 1941; raised, sank under tow to be broken up, 1947
Oldenburg (1910)	1910-06-30	Helgoland class	Dreadnought	Imperial German Navy	Surrendered to Japan 1920, broken up, 1921
Oregon	1893-10-26	Indiana class	Pre-dreadnought	United States Navy	Broken up, 1956
Oryol	1902-07-19	Borodino class	Pre-dreadnought	Imperial Russian Navy	Broken up, 1922
Orion	1910-08-20	Orion class	Super-dreadnought	Royal Navy	Broken up, 1922
Oslyabya	1898-11-08	Peresvet class	Pre-dreadnought	Imperial Russian Navy	Sunk at the Battle of Tsushima, 27 May 1905
Ostfriesland	1909-09-30	Helgoland class	Dreadnought	Imperial German Navy	Surrendered to USA 1920, sunk as a target by aircraft off Cape Henry, 21 July 1921
Paris	1912-09-28	Courbet class	Dreadnought	French Navy	Broken up, 1955
Patrie	1903-12-17	République class	Pre-dreadnought	French Navy	Broken up, 1928
Pennsylvania	1915-04-16	Pennsylvania class	Super-dreadnought	United States Navy	Sank as a target, 1948
Peresvet	1898-05-19	Peresvet class	Pre-dreadnought	Imperial Russian Navy	Mined and sunk, 4 January 1917
Petropavlovsk (1894)	1894-11-09	Petropavlovsk class	Pre-dreadnought	Imperial Russian Navy	Sunk, 13 April 1904
Petropavlovsk (1911)	1911-09-09	Gangut class	Dreadnought	Imperial Russian Navy	Sunk, 23 September 1941
Pobeda	1900-05-10	Peresvet class	Pre-dreadnought	Imperial Russian Navy	Broken up, 1922
Poltava (1894)	1894-11-06	Petropavlovsk class	Pre-dreadnought	Imperial Russian Navy	Broken up, 1923
Poltava (1911)	1911-07-10	Gangut class	Dreadnought	Imperial Russian Navy	Broken up, 1925
Pommern	1905-12-02	Deutschland class	Pre-dreadnought	Imperial German Navy	Torpedoed by British destroyers at the Battle of Jutland, 1 June 1916
Posen	1908-12-12	Nassau class	Dreadnought	Imperial German Navy	Surrendered to UK 1920, broken up, 1922
Potemkin	1900-10-09		Pre-dreadnought	Imperial Russian Navy	Broken up, 1922
Preussen	1903-10-30	Braunschweig class	Pre-dreadnought	Imperial German Navy	Partially scrapped, 1931; sunk by bombers, 1945; raised and scrapped, 1954
Prince George	1894-09-10	Majestic class	Pre-dreadnought	Royal Navy	Foundered en route to Germany for break-up, 30 December 1921
Prince of Wales (1902)	1902-03-25	London class	Pre-dreadnought	Royal Navy	Broken up, 1920
Prince of Wales (53)	1939-05-03	King George V class (1939)	Fast battleship	Royal Navy	Sunk by Japanese torpedo bombers off Kuantan, South China Sea, 10 December 1941
Prinz Eugen	1912-11-30	Tegetthoff class	Dreadnought	Austro-Hungarian Navy	Sunk as target off Toulon, 28 June 1922
Prinzregent Luitpold	1912-02-17	Kaiser class	Dreadnought	Imperial German Navy	Scuttled in Scapa Flow, 21 June 1919, raised for scrap 1931
Provence	1913-04-20	Bretagne class	Super-dreadnought	French Navy	Scuttled at Toulon, 27 November 1942, raised 1943, sunk again as blockship, raised again for scrap 1949
Queen	1902-03-08	London class	Pre-dreadnought	Royal Navy	Broken up, 1920
Queen Elizabeth	1913-10-16	Queen Elizabeth class	Super-dreadnought	Royal Navy	
Radetzky	1909-07-03	Radetzky class	Semi-dreadnought	Austro-Hungarian Navy	Broken up, 1920
Ramillies (1892)	1892-03-01	Royal Sovereign class	Pre-dreadnought	Royal Navy	Broken up, 1913
Ramillies (07)	1916-09-12	Revenge class	Super-dreadnought	Royal Navy	
Regina Elena	1904-06-19	Regina Elena class	Pre-dreadnought	Regia Marina	Broken up, 1923
Regina Margherita	1901-05-30	Regina Margherita class	Pre-dreadnought	Regia Marina	Sunk, 11 December 1916
Renown	1895-05-08	Centurion class (modified)	Pre-dreadnought	Royal Navy	Broken up, 1914
République	1902-09-04	République class	Pre-dreadnought	French Navy	Broken up, 1921
Repulse	1892-02-27	Royal Sovereign class	Pre-dreadnought	Royal Navy	Broken up, 1911
Resolution (1892)	1892-05-28	Royal Sovereign class	Pre-dreadnought	Royal Navy	Broken up, 1914
Resolution (09)	1915-01-14	Revenge class	Super-dreadnought	Royal Navy	
Retvizan	1900-10-23		Pre-dreadnought	Imperial Russian Navy	Sunk as a target ship, July 1924
Revenge (1892)	1892-11-03	Royal Sovereign class	Pre-dreadnought	Royal Navy	Broken up, 1919
Revenge (06)	1915-05-29	Revenge class	Super-dreadnought	Royal Navy	Ex-Renown
Rheinland	1908-09-26	Nassau class	Dreadnought	Imperial German Navy	Surrendered to UK 1920, broken up, 1921
Rhode Island	1904-5-17	Virginia class	Pre-dreadnought	United States Navy	Broken up, 1923
Richelieu	1939-01-17	Richelieu class	Fast battleship	French Navy	Broken up, 1968
Rivadavia	1911-08-26	Rivadavia class	Dreadnought	Argentine Navy	Broken up, 1956
Rodney	1925-12-17	Nelson class	Treaty battleship	Royal Navy	
Roma (1907)	1907-04-21	Regina Elena class	Pre-dreadnought	Regia Marina	Broken up, 1932
Roma (1940)	1940-06-09	Littorio class	Fast battleship	Regia Marina	Sunk, 9 September 1943
Rostislav	1896-09		Pre-dreadnought	Imperial Russian Navy	Sunk, November 1920
Royal Oak (1892)	1892-11-05	Royal Sovereign class	Pre-dreadnought	Royal Navy	Broken up, 1914
Royal Oak (08)	1914-11-17	Revenge class	Super-dreadnought	Royal Navy	Torpedoed by German U-47 at Scapa Flow, 14 October 1939
Royal Sovereign (1891)	1891-02-26	Royal Sovereign class	Pre-dreadnought	Royal Navy	Broken up, 1913
Royal Sovereign (05)	1915-04-29	Revenge class	Super-dreadnought	Royal Navy	Transferred to Soviet Union 1944–49, renamed Arkhangelsk
Russell	1901-02-19	Duncan class	Pre-dreadnought	Royal Navy	Mined off Malta, 27 April 1916
Sachsen	1916-11-21	Bayern class	Super-dreadnought	Imperial German Navy	Incomplete at end of World War I, broken up, 1921
Saint Louis	1896-09-02	Charlemagne class	Pre-dreadnought	French Navy	Broken up, 1933
Salamis	1914-11-11		Dreadnought	Royal Hellenic Navy	Cancelled, December 1914; broken up, 1932
São Paulo	1909-04-19	Minas Geraes class	Dreadnought	Brazilian Navy	Foundered, 4 November 1951
Satsuma	1906-11-06	Satsuma class	Semi-dreadnought	Imperial Japanese Navy	Sunk as target, 7 September 1924
Scharnhorst	1936-10-03	Scharnhorst class	Fast battleship	Kriegsmarine	Sunk at the Battle of North Cape, 26 December 1943
Schlesien	1906-05-28	Deutschland class	Pre-dreadnought	Imperial German Navy	Scuttled after mine strike at Swinemünde, 3 May 1945, broken up in situ 1949–1956
Schleswig-Holstein	1906-12-17	Deutschland class	Pre-dreadnought	Imperial German Navy	Sunk by British air attack at Gotenhafen, 18 December 1944, raised and used as target by Soviet Navy until the 1960s
Schwaben	1901-08-19	Wittelsbach class	Pre-dreadnought	Imperial German Navy	Broken up, 1920
Settsu	1911-03-30	Kawachi class	Dreadnought	Imperial Japanese Navy	Sunk, 24 July 1945
Sevastopol (1895)	1895-06-01	Petropavlovsk class	Pre-dreadnought	Imperial Russian Navy	Scuttled, 2 January 1905
Sevastopol (1911)	1911-06-26	Gangut class	Dreadnought	Imperial Russian Navy	Broken up, 1957
Shikishima	1898-11-01	Shikishima class	Pre-dreadnought	Imperial Japanese Navy	Broken up, 1947
Shinano	1944-10-08	Yamato class	Fast battleship	Imperial Japanese Navy	Converted to aircraft carrier, sunk by USS Archerfish, 29 November 1944
Sissoi Veliky	1894-06		Pre-dreadnought	Imperial Russian Navy	Sunk at the Battle of Tsushima, 28 May 1905
Slava	1903-08-29	Borodino class	Pre-dreadnought	Imperial Russian Navy	Sunk at the Battle of Moon Sound, 17 October 1917
South Carolina	1908-07-25	South Carolina class	Dreadnought	United States Navy	Broken up, 1924
South Dakota (BB-57)	1941-06-07	South Dakota class	Fast battleship	United States Navy	Broken up 1962, parts preserved at Sioux Falls, South Dakota
St. Vincent	1908-09-10	St. Vincent class	Dreadnought	Royal Navy	Broken up, 1921
Strasbourg	1936-12-12	Dunkerque class	Fast battleship	French Navy	Scuttled at Toulon, 27 November 1942; broken up, 1955
Suffren	1899-07-25		Pre-dreadnought	French Navy	Sunk by U-47, 1916
Superb	1907-11-07	Bellerophon class	Dreadnought	Royal Navy	Broken up, 1923
Swiftsure	1903-01-12	Swiftsure class	Pre-dreadnought	Royal Navy	Ex-Chilean Constitución, purchased 1903; broken up, 1920
Szent István	1914-01-17	Tegetthoff class	Dreadnought	Austro-Hungarian Navy	Sunk by MAS 15, 10 June 1918
Tegetthoff	1912-03-21	Tegetthoff class	Dreadnought	Austro-Hungarian Navy	Broken up, 1924
Temeraire	1907-08-24	Bellerophon class	Dreadnought	Royal Navy	Broken up, 1921
Tennessee	1919-04-30	Tennessee class	Super-dreadnought	United States Navy	Broken up, 1959
Texas	1912-05-18	New York class	Super-dreadnought	United States Navy	Museum ship at San Jacinto Battleground State Historic Site
Thunderer	1911-02-01	Orion class	Super-dreadnought	Royal Navy	Broken up, 1926
Thüringen	1909-11-27	Helgoland class	Dreadnought	Imperial German Navy	Surrendered to France 1920, beached off Gâvres as a target, broken up, 1923–1933
Tirpitz	1939-04-01	Bismarck class	Fast battleship	Kriegsmarine	Sunk, 12 November 1944
Tosa	1921-12-18	Tosa class	Super-dreadnought	Imperial Japanese Navy	Cancelled under terms of Washington Naval Treaty 1922; scuttled, 9 February 1925
Tri Sviatitelia	1893-11-12		Pre-dreadnought	Imperial Russian Navy	Broken up, 1922
Triumph	1903-01-15	Swiftsure class	Pre-dreadnought	Royal Navy	Ex-Chilean Libertad, purchased 1903; torpedoed by German U-21, 25 May 1915
Tsesarevich	1901-02-23		Pre-dreadnought	Imperial Russian Navy	Broken up, 1922
Utah	1909-12-23	Florida class	Dreadnought	United States Navy	Sunk at Pearl Harbor, 1941
Valiant	1914-11-04	Queen Elizabeth class	Super-dreadnought	Royal Navy	
Vanguard (1909)	1909-02-22	St. Vincent class	Dreadnought	Royal Navy	Destroyed by magazine explosion, 9 July 1917
Vanguard (23)	1944-11-30		Fast battleship	Royal Navy	Last battleship launched, sold for scrap in 1960
Vasilefs Konstantinos	Cancelled before launch	Bretagne class	Dreadnought	Royal Hellenic Navy	Work halted August 1914, broken up in 1925
Venerable	1899-11-02	London class	Pre-dreadnought	Royal Navy	Broken up, 1920
Vengeance	1899-07-25	Canopus class	Pre-dreadnought	Royal Navy	Broken up, 1921
Vergniaud	1910-04-12	Danton class	Semi-dreadnought	French Navy	Broken up, 1929
Vérité	1907-05-28	Liberté class	Pre-dreadnought	French Navy	Broken up, 1922
Vermont	1905-08-31	Connecticut class	Pre-dreadnought	United States Navy	Broken up, 1923
Victorious	1895-10-19	Majestic class	Pre-dreadnought	Royal Navy	Broken up, 1922
Virginia	1904-04-05	Virginia class	Pre-dreadnought	United States Navy	Sunk as a target, 1923
Viribus Unitis	1911-06-24	Tegetthoff class	Dreadnought	Austro-Hungarian Navy	Sunk by Italian limpet mine, 1 November 1918
Vittorio Emanuele	1904-10-12	Regina Elena class	Pre-dreadnought	Regia Marina	Broken up, 1923
Vittorio Veneto	1937-07-22	Littorio class	Fast battleship	Regia Marina	Broken up, 1948
Voltaire	1909-01-16	Danton class	Semi-dreadnought	French Navy	Broken up, 1939
Warspite	1913-11-26	Queen Elizabeth class	Super-dreadnought	Royal Navy	
Washington (BB-47)	1921-09-01	Colorado class	Super-dreadnought	United States Navy	Cancelled under terms of Washington Naval Treaty, 1922; sunk as gunnery target, 1924
Washington (BB-56)	1940-06-01	North Carolina class	Fast battleship	United States Navy	Sold for scrap, 1961
Weissenburg	1891-12-14	Brandenburg class	Pre-dreadnought	Imperial German Navy	Sold to Turkey, 12 September 1910; renamed Turgut Reis; broken up, 1950
West Virginia	1921-11-19	Colorado class	Super-dreadnought	United States Navy	Broken up, 1959
Westfalen	1908-07-01	Nassau class	Dreadnought	Imperial German Navy	Surrendered to UK 1920, broken up, 1924
Wettin	1901-06-06	Wittelsbach class	Pre-dreadnought	Imperial German Navy	Broken up, 1920
Wisconsin (BB-9)	1898-11-26	Illinois class	Pre-dreadnought	United States Navy	Broken up, 1922
Wisconsin (BB-64)	1943-12-07	Iowa class	Fast battleship	United States Navy	Museum ship at Nauticus in Norfolk, Virginia
Wittelsbach	1900-07-03	Wittelsbach class	Pre-dreadnought	Imperial German Navy	Broken up, 1920
Wörth	1892-08-06	Brandenburg class	Pre-dreadnought	Imperial German Navy	Broken up, 1919
Württemberg	1917-06-20	Bayern class	Super-dreadnought	Imperial German Navy	Incomplete at end of World War I, broken up, 1921
Wyoming	1911-05-25	Wyoming class	Dreadnought	United States Navy	Broken up, 1948
Yamashiro	1915-11-03	Fusō class	Super-dreadnought	Imperial Japanese Navy	Sunk during Battle of Leyte Gulf, 25 October 1944
Yamato	1940-08-08	Yamato class	Fast battleship	Imperial Japanese Navy	Sunk, 7 April 1945
Yashima	1896-02-28	Fuji class	Pre-dreadnought	Imperial Japanese Navy	Mined and sunk, 15 May 1904
Zähringen	1901-06-12	Wittelsbach class	Pre-dreadnought	Imperial German Navy	Converted to radio-controlled target ship 1926–28; scuttled as blockship at Gotenhafen, 26 March 1945, broken up in situ 1949–1950
Zrínyi	1910-04-12	Radetzky class	Semi-dreadnought	Austro-Hungarian Navy	Broken up, 1920

== See also ==
- List of ironclads
- List of battlecruisers
- List of battleships of World War I
- List of battleships of World War II
