= Italian battleship Regina Elena =

Pre-dreadnought battleship of the Italian Royal Navy

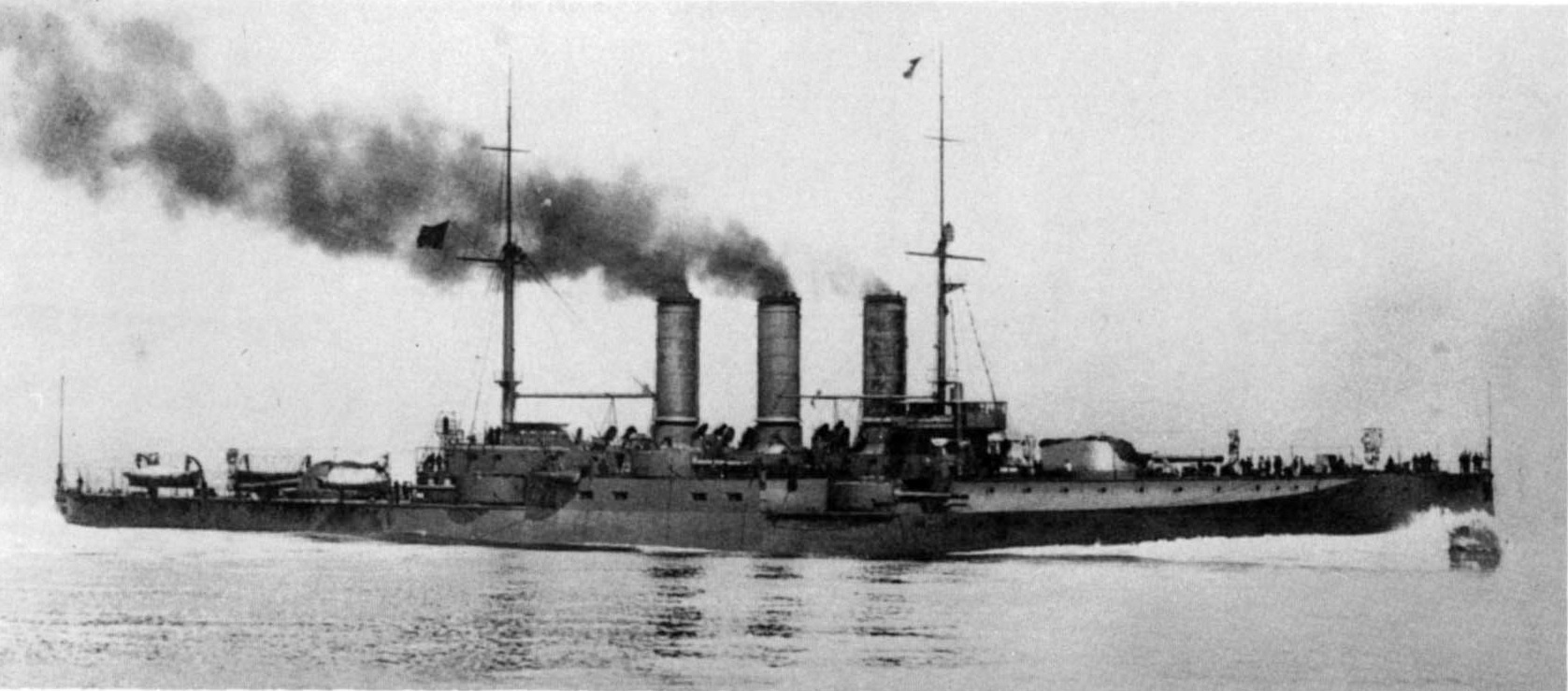
- Regina Elena on 17 May 1907, about four months before she was commissioned.

History

Italy
- Name: Regina Elena
- Namesake: Elena of Montenegro
- Operator: Regia Marina (Italian Royal Navy)
- Builder: Arsenale di La Spezia
- Laid down: 27 March 1901
- Launched: 19 June 1904
- Completed: 11 September 1907
- Stricken: 16 February 1923
- Fate: Scrapped

General characteristics
- Class & type: Regina Elena-class battleship
- Displacement: 13,807 long tons (14,029 t)
- Length: 144.6 m (474 ft 5 in)
- Beam: 22.4 m (73 ft 6 in)
- Draft: 8.58 m (28 ft 2 in)
- Installed power: 28 × Belleville boilers; 19,299 ihp (14,391 kW)
- Propulsion: 2 × triple-expansion steam engines; 2 × screw propellers
- Speed: 20.8 knots (38.5 km/h; 23.9 mph)
- Range: 10,000 nmi (19,000 km; 12,000 mi) at 10 knots (19 km/h; 12 mph)
- Complement: 742–764
- Armament: 2 × 305 mm (12 in)/40 guns; 12 × 203 mm (8 in)/45 guns; 16 × 76 mm (3 in)/40 guns; 2 × 450 mm (17.7 in) torpedo tubes
- Armor: Belt: 250 mm (9.8 in); Turrets: 203 mm (8 in); Decks: 38 mm (1.5 in); Conning tower: 254 mm (10 in)

Regina Elena was the lead ship of her class of pre-dreadnought battleships built for the Italian Regia Marina (Royal Navy). The ship was built by the La Spezia shipyard between 1901 and 1907, and was armed with a main battery of two 305 mm (12 in) guns and twelve 203 mm (8 in) guns. She was quite fast for the period, with a top speed of nearly 21 knots (39 km/h; 24 mph). Regina Elena was active in both the Italo-Turkish War with the Ottoman Empire in 1911–1912, where she participated in the Italian conquest of Cyrenaica, and World War I in 1915–1918, where she saw no action due to the threat of submarines in the narrow confines of the Adriatic Sea. She was retained for a few years after the war, but was ultimately stricken in February 1923 and broken up for scrap.

== Design ==
The design for the Regina Elena class was prepared by the noted naval engineer, Vittorio Cuniberti, then the Chief Engineer of the Italian Regia Marina (Royal Navy). The Navy specified a vessel that would be more powerful than contemporary armored cruisers and faster than foreign pre-dreadnought battleships on a displacement of no more than 13,000 long tons (13,210 t). The first two vessels—Regina Elena and Vittorio Emanuele—were ordered for the 1901 fiscal year, and the final pair—Roma and Napoli—were authorized the following year.

=== Characteristics ===
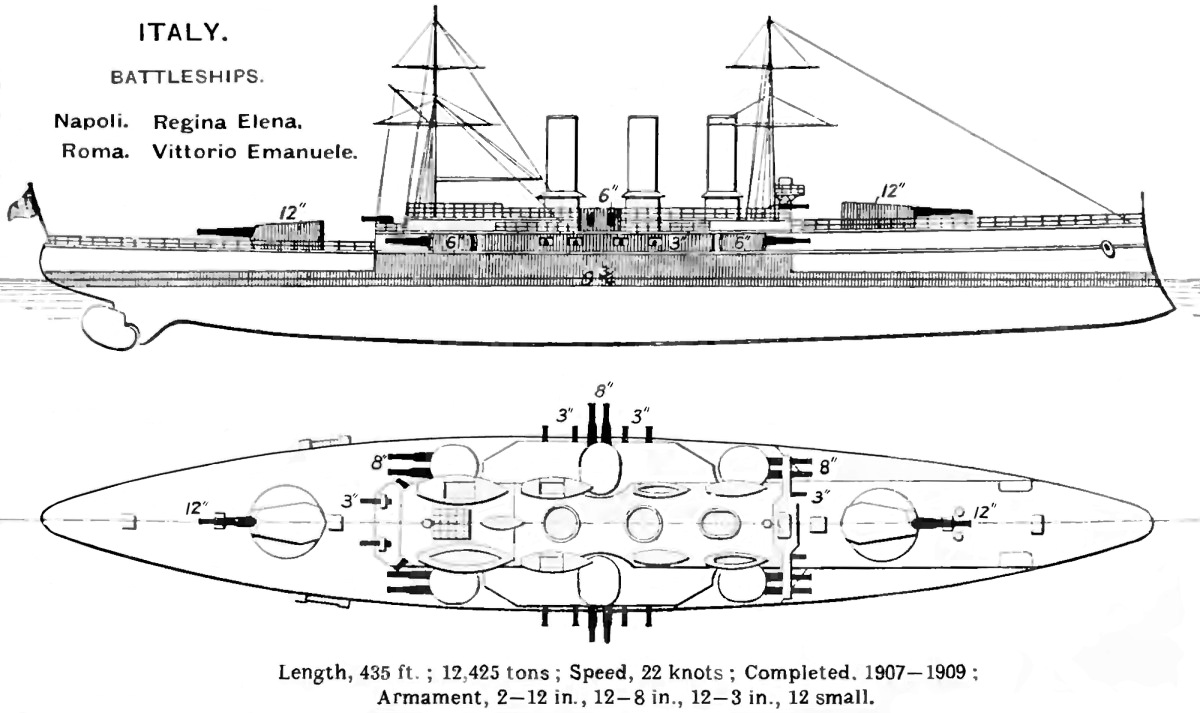
A line drawing of the Regina Elena-class battleships from the 1912 edition of Brassey's Naval Annual

Regina Elena was 144.6 meters (474 ft 5 in) long overall and had a beam of 22.4 m (73 ft 6 in) and a maximum draft of 8.58 m (28 ft 2 in). She displaced 13,807 long tons (14,029 t) at full load. The ship had a slightly inverted bow and a long forecastle deck that extended past the main mast. Regina Elena had a crew of 742–764 officers and enlisted men.

Her propulsion system consisted of two vertical triple-expansion steam engines, each driving a screw propeller. Steam for the engines was provided by twenty-eight coal-fired Belleville boilers that were vented into three funnels. The ship's propulsion system was rated at 19,299 indicated horsepower (14,391 kW) and provided a top speed of 20.8 knots (38.5 km/h; 23.9 mph) and a range of approximately 10,000 nautical miles (19,000 km; 12,000 mi) at 10 knots (19 km/h; 12 mph).

As built, the ship was armed with a main battery of two 305 mm (12 in) 40-caliber guns placed in two single gun turrets, one forward and one aft. The ship was also equipped with a secondary battery of twelve 203 mm (8 in) 45-cal. guns in six twin turrets amidships. Close-range defense against torpedo boats was provided by a battery of sixteen 76 mm (3 in) 40-cal. guns in casemates and pivot mounts. Regina Elena was also equipped with two 450 mm (17.7 in) torpedo tubes placed in the hull below the waterline.

Regina Elena was protected with Krupp steel manufactured in Terni. The main belt was 250 mm (9.8 in) thick, and the deck was 38 mm (1.5 in) thick. The conning tower was protected by 254 mm (10 in) of armor plating. The main battery guns had 203 mm thick plating, and the secondary gun turrets had 152 mm (6 in) thick sides.

== Service history ==
Regina Elena was laid down at the Arsenale di La Spezia shipyard in La Spezia on 27 March 1901, and was launched on 19 June 1904. After fitting-out work was completed, she was commissioned into the Italian fleet on 11 September 1907. She thereafter served in the Mediterranean Squadron, and was ready for the annual maneuvers in late September and early October, under the command of Vice Admiral Alfonso di Brocchetti. In April 1908, Regina Elena participated in a naval demonstration off Asia Minor in protest of the Ottoman decision to prohibit Italian post offices in Ottoman territory. The ship was at that time commanded by Prince Luigi Amedeo, Duke of the Abruzzi. The ship went to Messina in the aftermath of the 1908 Messina earthquake. Regina Elena remained in the active duty squadron through 1910, by which time her three sisters had been completed, bringing the total number of front-line battleships to six, including the two Regina Margherita-class battleships. (Note: These were all pre-dreadnought battleships, and were thus obsolescent by this period, but Italy's first dreadnought, Dante Alighieri, did not enter service until 1913.)

=== Italo-Turkish War ===
Regina Elena at anchor

On 29 September 1911, Italy declared war on the Ottoman Empire in order to seize Libya. For the duration of the conflict, Regina Elena was assigned to the 1st Division of the 1st Squadron along with her three sisters, under the command of Vice Admiral Augusto Aubry. She joined the squadron late, on 5 October. On 18 October, Regina Elena and her three sisters, along with three cruisers and several destroyers and torpedo boats escorted a convoy that carried half of the 2nd Infantry Division to Benghazi. When the Ottomans refused to surrender the city before the amphibious assault, the Italian fleet opened fire on the Turkish defenders at 08:00, while landing parties from the ships and the Army infantry went ashore. The Italians quickly forced the Ottomans to withdraw into the city by evening. After a short siege, the Ottoman forces withdrew on 29 October, leaving the city to the Italians.

By December, Regina Elena and the other ships of the 1st Squadron were dispersed in the ports of Cyrenaica. Regina Elena, Roma, and the armored cruiser San Marco were stationed in Benghazi, with Regina Elena recently arriving from Tobruk. While there, they supported the Italian Army as it occupied the city and surrounding area by contributing landing parties and providing fire support to the ground troops. The gunfire support supplied by Regina Elena contributed to the defeat of a major attack on the city by an Ottoman army on 14–15 December. In early 1912, most of the fleet had withdrawn to Italy for repairs and refit, leaving only a small force of cruisers and light craft to patrol the North African coast.

The 1st Division left Taranto on 13 April for a demonstration off the Anatolian coast, along with the battleships of the 3rd Division, which had left from Tobruk. The two squadrons met on 17 April off the island of Stampalia, after which the combined fleet steamed north. The following day, the ships cut submarine telegraph cables between Imbros, Tenedos, Lemnos, Salonica, and the Dardanelles. The ships then steamed to the entrance to the Dardanelles in an attempt to lure out the Ottoman fleet. When the Ottoman coastal fortifications began to take the Italian ships under fire, the Italians returned fire and inflicted serious damage on them. On 19 April, Regina Elena and most of the fleet returned to Italy, leaving only Pisa, Amalfi, and a flotilla of torpedo boats to cruise off the Ottoman coast.

On 30 April, the 1st Division again departed from Taranto, bound for the island of Rhodes. Meanwhile, the 3rd Division battleships escorted a convoy of troopships from Tobruk to the island. The Italian heavy ships cruised off the city of Rhodes while the transports landed the expeditionary force 10 miles (16 km) to the south on 4 May; the soldiers quickly advanced on the city, supported by artillery fire from the Italian fleet. The Turks surrendered the city the following day. Between 8 and 20 May, Regina Elena was involved in the seizure of several islands in the Dodecanese between Crete, Rhodes, and Samos. In June, Regina Elena and the rest of the 1st Division was stationed at Rhodes. Over the next two months, the ships cruised in the Aegean to prevent the Turks from attempting to launch their own amphibious operations to retake the islands Italy had seized in May. The 1st Division returned to Italy in late August for repairs and refitting, and were replaced by the battleships of the 2nd Squadron. The 1st Division left port on 14 October, but was recalled later that day, when the Ottomans had agreed to sign a peace treaty to end the war.

In March 1914, Regina Elena was involved in experiments with wireless telegraphy in Syracuse, Sicily. The tests were conducted by Guglielmo Marconi and were supervised by the Duke of the Abruzzi.

=== World War I ===
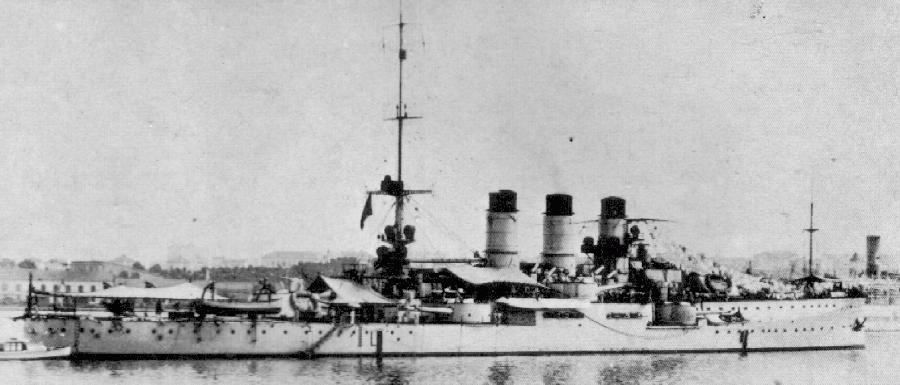
Regina Elena at Taranto in May 1915.

Italy declared neutrality after the outbreak of World War I in August 1914, but by July 1915, the Triple Entente had convinced the Italians to enter the war against the Central Powers. The primary naval opponent for the duration of the war was the Austro-Hungarian Navy; the Naval Chief of Staff, Admiral Paolo Thaon di Revel, believed the threat from submarines in the confined waters of the Adriatic was too serious to permit an active fleet policy. He therefore planned a distant blockade with the battle fleet, while smaller vessels, such as the MAS boats conducted raids. The heavy ships of the Italian fleet would be preserved for a potential major battle in the event that the Austro-Hungarian fleet should emerge from its bases.

As a result, the ship's career during the war was limited. During the war, Regina Elena and her three sisters were assigned to the 2nd Division. They spent much of the war rotating between the bases at Taranto, Brindisi, and Valona, but did not see combat. In February 1916, Regina Elena and Roma sortied briefly in response to mistaken reports that the Austro-Hungarian fleet was at sea. On 14–15 May 1917, three light cruisers of the Austro-Hungarian Navy raided the Otranto Barrage; in the ensuring Battle of the Strait of Otranto, Regina Elena and her sisters raised steam to assist the Allied warships, but the Italian commander refused to permit them to join the battle for fear of risking their loss in the submarine-infested Adriatic.

Under the terms of the Washington Naval Treaty, Italy was permitted to retain Regina Elena and her three sisters. The Italian Navy could have kept the ships in service indefinitely, but they could not be replaced by new battleships under the normal practice of the Treaty system. Nevertheless, she was stricken from the naval register on 16 February 1923 and subsequently broken up for scrap.
