= Italian battleship Vittorio Emanuele =

Pre-dreadnought battleship of the Italian Royal Navy

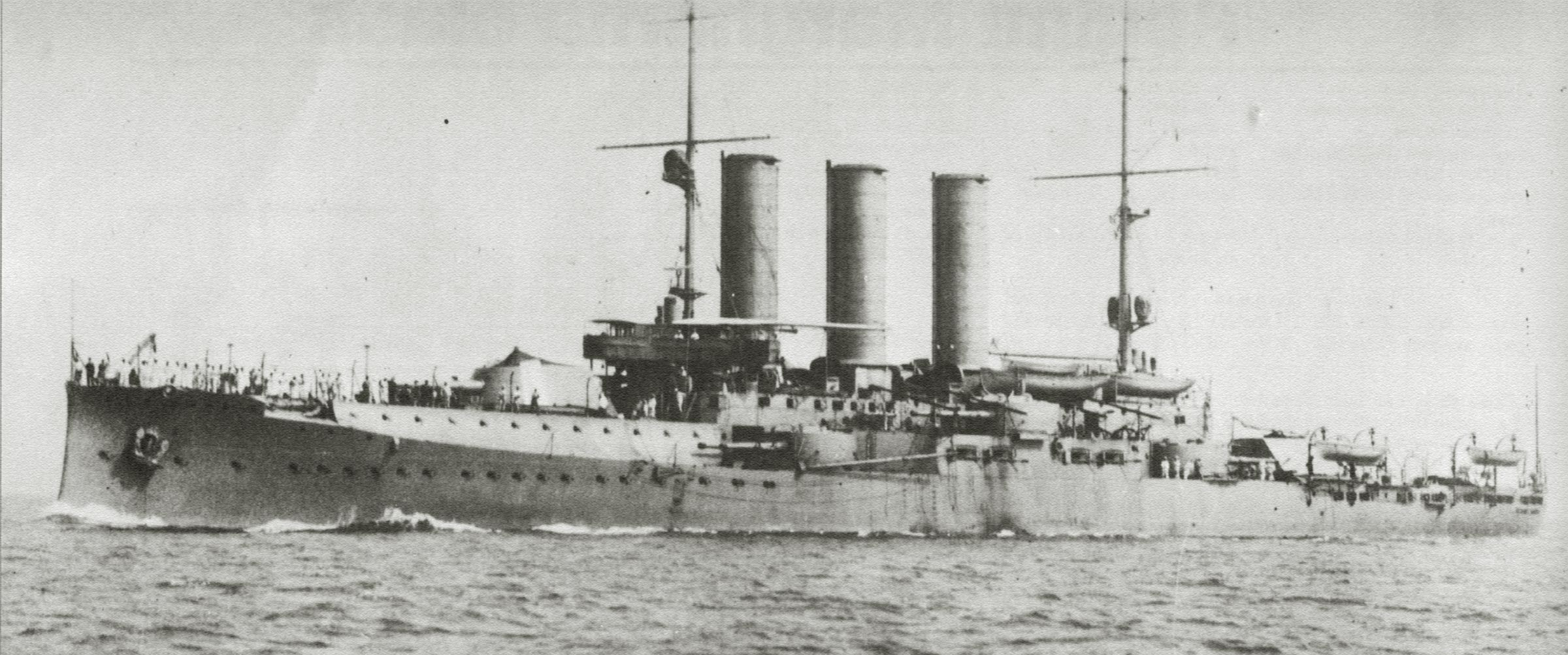
- Vittorio Emanuele during World War I

History

Italy
- Name: Vittorio Emanuele
- Namesake: Victor Emmanuel II of Italy
- Operator: Regia Marina (Italian Royal Navy)
- Builder: Regio Cantiere di Castellammare di Stabia
- Laid down: 18 September 1901
- Launched: 12 October 1904
- Completed: 1 August 1908
- Stricken: 1 April 1923
- Fate: Scrapped

General characteristics
- Class & type: Regina Elena-class battleship
- Displacement: 13,914 long tons (14,137 t)
- Length: 144.6 m (474 ft 5 in)
- Beam: 22.4 m (73 ft 6 in)
- Draft: 8.58 m (28 ft 2 in)
- Installed power: 28 × Belleville boilers; 19,424 ihp (14,484 kW)
- Propulsion: 2 × triple-expansion steam engines; 2 × screw propellers
- Speed: 21.36 knots (39.56 km/h; 24.58 mph)
- Range: 10,000 nmi (19,000 km; 12,000 mi) at 10 knots (19 km/h; 12 mph)
- Complement: 742–764
- Armament: 2 × 305 mm (12 in)/40 guns; 12 × 203 mm (8 in)/45 guns; 16 × 76 mm (3 in)/40 guns; 2 × 450 mm (17.7 in) torpedo tubes
- Armor: Belt: 250 mm (9.8 in); Turrets: 203 mm (8 in); Decks: 38 mm (1.5 in); Conning tower: 254 mm (10 in)

Vittorio Emanuele was an Italian pre-dreadnought battleship, laid down in 1901, launched in 1904 and completed in 1908. She was the second member of the Regina Elena class, which included three other vessels: Regina Elena, Napoli, and Roma. Vittorio Emmanuele was armed with a main battery of two 305 mm (12 in) guns and twelve 203 mm (8 in) guns. She was quite fast for the period, with a top speed of nearly 21 knots (39 km/h; 24 mph).

Vittorio Emmaneule saw action in the Italo-Turkish War as the flagship of the 1st Division. During the war, she participated in operations in Cyrenaica and the eastern Mediterranean Sea, including the seizure of the islands of Rhodes and the Dodecanese. She served during the First World War, but saw no combat during the war due to the hesitance of both the Italian and Austro-Hungarian navies to risk their capital ships in pitched battle. She remained in service as a training ship until 1923, when she was stricken from the naval register and broken up for scrap.

== Design ==
The design for the Regina Elena class was prepared by the noted naval engineer, Vittorio Cuniberti, then the Chief Engineer of the Italian Regia Marina (Royal Navy). The Navy specified a vessel that would be more powerful than contemporary armored cruisers and faster than foreign pre-dreadnought battleships on a displacement of no more than 13,000 long tons (13,210 t). The first two vessels—Regina Elena and Vittorio Emanuele—were ordered for the 1901 fiscal year, and the final pair—Roma and Napoli—were authorized the following year.

=== Characteristics ===
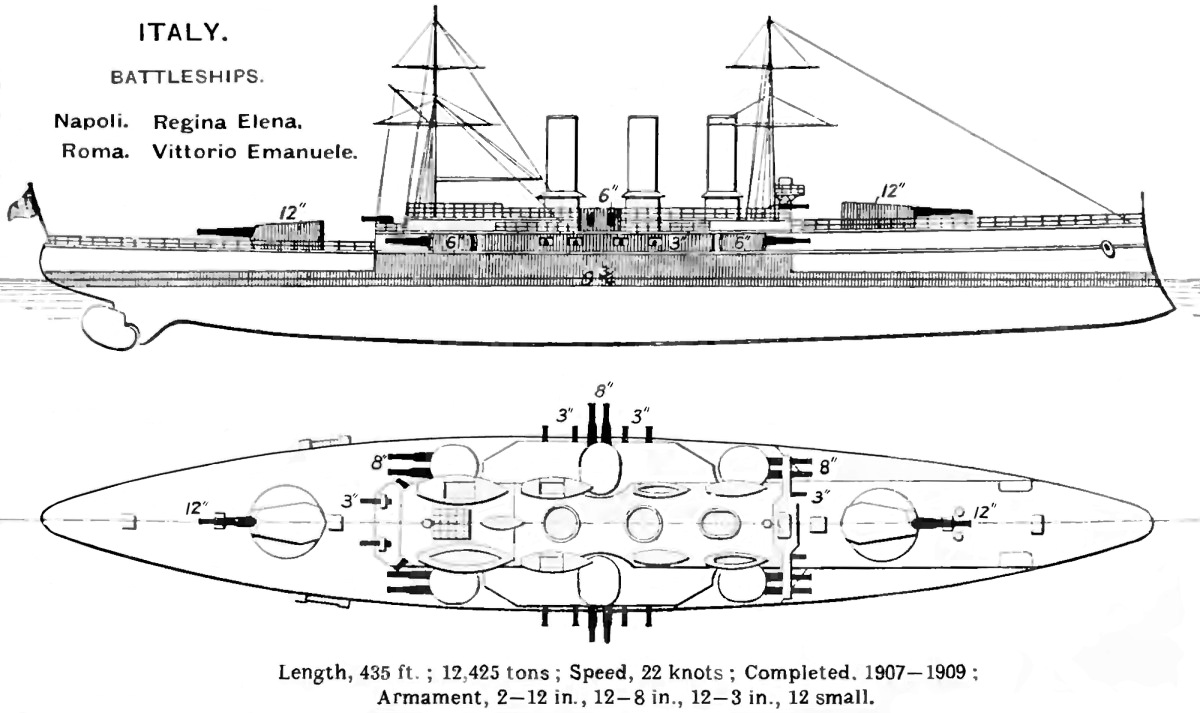
A line drawing of the Regina Elena-class battleships from the 1912 edition of Brassey's Naval Annual

Vittorio Emanuele was 144.6 meters (474 ft 5 in) long overall and had a beam of 22.4 m (73 ft 6 in) and a maximum draft of 8.58 m (28 ft 2 in). She displaced 13,914 long tons (14,137 t) at full load. The ship had a slightly inverted bow and a long forecastle deck that extended past the main mast. Vittorio Emanuele had a crew of 742–764 officers and enlisted men.

Her propulsion system consisted of two vertical triple-expansion steam engines, each driving a screw propeller. Steam for the engines was provided by twenty-eight coal-fired Belleville boilers that were vented into three funnels. The ship's propulsion system was rated at 19,424 indicated horsepower (14,484 kW) and provided a top speed of 21.36 knots (39.56 km/h; 24.58 mph) and a range of approximately 10,000 nautical miles (18,520 km; 11,508 mi) at 10 knots (19 km/h; 12 mph).

As built, the ship was armed with a main battery of two 305 mm (12 in) 40-caliber guns placed in two single gun turrets, one forward and one aft. The ship was also equipped with a secondary battery of twelve 203 mm (8 in) 45-cal. guns in six twin turrets amidships. Close-range defense against torpedo boats was provided by a battery of sixteen 76 mm (3 in) 40-cal. guns in casemates and pivot mounts. Vittorio Emanuele was also equipped with two 450 mm (17.7 in) torpedo tubes placed in the hull below the waterline.

Vittorio Emanuele was protected with Krupp steel manufactured in Terni. The main belt was 250 mm (9.8 in) thick, and the deck was 38 mm (1.5 in) thick. The conning tower was protected by 254 mm (10 in) of armor plating. The main battery guns had 203 mm thick plating, and the secondary gun turrets had 152 mm (6 in) thick sides.

== Service history ==
Vittorio Emanuele was built by the Regio Cantiere di Castellammare di Stabia shipyard in Castellammare di Stabia; her keel was laid down on 18 September 1901. The ship was launched on 12 October 1904, and construction was completed on 1 August 1908. Vittorio Emanuele served in the active duty squadron through 1910, by which time her three sisters had been completed, bringing the total number of front-line battleships to six, which also included the two Regina Margherita-class battleships. (Note: These were all pre-dreadnought battleships, and were thus obsolescent by this period, but Italy's first dreadnought, Dante Alighieri, did not enter service until 1913.) The active duty squadron was typically in service for seven months of the year for training; the rest of the year they were placed in reserve.

=== Italo-Turkish War ===
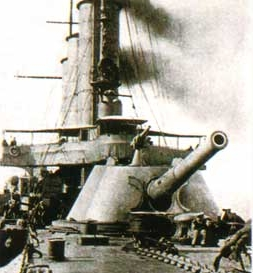
The forward gun turret on Vittorio Emanuele

On 29 September 1911, Italy declared war on the Ottoman Empire in order to seize Libya. Vittorio Emanuele served as the flagship of Vice Admiral Augusto Aubry, the commander of the 1st Division throughout the conflict. On 30 September, Vittorio Emanuele, her sister Roma, and the armored cruiser Pisa cruised in the Aegean Sea, searching for the Ottoman training squadron that had departed Beirut for Constantinople two days before, and did not know that war had been declared. The Italian flotilla failed to locate its prey, which managed to safely reach Constantinople.

On 18 October, Vittorio Emanuele and her three sisters, along with three cruisers and several destroyers and torpedo boats escorted a convoy that carried half of the 2nd Infantry Division to Benghazi. When the Ottomans refused to surrender the city before the amphibious assault, the Italian fleet opened fire on the Turkish defenders at 08:00, while landing parties from the ships and the Army infantry went ashore. The Italians quickly forced the Ottomans to withdraw into the city by evening. After a short siege, the Ottoman forces withdrew on 29 October, leaving the city to the Italians.

By December, Vittorio Emanuele and the other ships of the 1st Squadron were dispersed in the ports of Cyrenaica. Vittorio Emanuele, Pisa, and the protected cruisers Etruria and Etna were stationed in Tobruk. While there, they supported the Italian Army as it occupied the city and surrounding area by contributing landing parties and providing fire support to the ground troops. In early 1912, most of the fleet had withdrawn to Italy for repairs and refit, leaving only a small force of cruisers and light craft to patrol the North African coast. On 4 March, Aubry died while aboard his flagship; Admiral Luigi Faravelli replaced him as the squadron commander.

On 13 April, the 1st Division left Taranto, bound for the island of Rhodes. Meanwhile, the 3rd Division escorted a convoy of troopships from Tobruk to the island. The Italian heavy ships demonstrated off the city of Rhodes while the transports landed the expeditionary force 10 miles (16 km) to the south on 4 May; the soldiers quickly advanced on the city, supported by artillery fire from the Italian fleet. The Turks surrendered the city the following day. Between 8 and 20 May, Vittorio Emanuele was involved in the seizure of several islands in the Dodecanese between Crete, Rhodes, and Samos.

In June, Vittorio Emanuele and the rest of the 1st Division was stationed at Rhodes. Over the next two months, the ships cruised in the Aegean to prevent the Turks from attempting to launch their own amphibious operations to retake the islands Italy had seized in May. The 1st Division returned to Italy in late August for repairs and refitting, and were replaced by the battleships of the 2nd Squadron. The 1st Division left port on 14 October, but was recalled later that day, when the Ottomans had agreed to sign a peace treaty to end the war.

=== World War I ===
Italy declared neutrality after the outbreak of World War I in August 1914, but by July 1915, the Triple Entente had convinced the Italians to enter the war against the Central Powers. The Austro-Hungarian Navy, Italy's traditional naval rival, was the primary opponent in the conflict. The Italian Naval Chief of Staff, Admiral Paolo Thaon di Revel, believed that an active fleet policy was prohibited by the serious threat from submarines in the confined waters of the Adriatic Sea. Instead, Revel decided to implement blockade at the southern end of the Adriatic with the battle fleet, while smaller vessels, such as the MAS boats conducted raids on Austro-Hungarian ships and installations. Meanwhile, Revel's capital ships would be preserved to confront the Austro-Hungarian battle fleet in the event that it sought a decisive engagement. As a result, the ship was not particularly active during the war.

During the war, Vittorio Emanuele and her three sisters were assigned to the 2nd Division. They spent much of the war rotating between the bases at Taranto, Brindisi, and Valona, but did not see combat. On 14–15 May 1917, three light cruisers of the Austro-Hungarian Navy raided the Otranto Barrage; in the ensuring Battle of the Strait of Otranto, Vittorio Emanuele and her sisters raised steam to assist the Allied warships, but the Italian commander refused to permit them to join the battle for fear of risking their loss in the submarine-infested Adriatic.

After the end of the war, Vittorio Emanuele was used as a training ship for a short period. In the summer of 1922, she was in Constantinople when the American destroyer USS Bulmer accidentally collided with a cutter from Vittorio Emanuele, causing minor damage to the boat. Then-Lieutenant Joseph J. Clark, Bulmer's executive officer, came aboard Vittorio Emanuele to apologize for the incident.

In early 1922, the world's major navies, including Italy, signed the Washington Naval Treaty. According to the terms of the treaty, Italy could keep Vittorio Emanuele and her three sisters, along with the newer dreadnought battleships. Due to the small size and age of the ships, particularly in comparison to the modern dreadnoughts, the Italians could have kept the ships in service indefinitely. They could not, however, be replaced by new battleships under the normal practice of the Treaty system, which provided for replacements after a ship was 20 years old. Vittorio Emanuele was stricken from the naval register on 1 April 1923 and subsequently broken up for scrap.
