= Italian battleship Napoli =

Pre-dreadnought battleship of the Italian Royal Navy

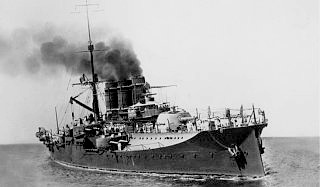
- Napoli

History

Italy
- Name: Napoli
- Namesake: Naples
- Operator: Regia Marina (Italian Royal Navy)
- Builder: Regio Cantiere di Castellammare di Stabia
- Laid down: 21 October 1903
- Launched: 10 September 1905
- Completed: 1 September 1908
- Stricken: 3 September 1926
- Fate: Scrapped

General characteristics
- Class & type: Regina Elena-class battleship
- Displacement: 13,774 long tons (13,995 t)
- Length: 144.6 m (474 ft 5 in)
- Beam: 22.4 m (73 ft 6 in)
- Draft: 8.58 m (28 ft 2 in)
- Installed power: 28 × Babcock & Wilcox boilers; 19,618 ihp (14,629 kW)
- Propulsion: 2 × triple-expansion steam engines; 2 × screw propellers
- Speed: 21.39 knots (39.61 km/h; 24.62 mph)
- Range: 10,000 nmi (19,000 km; 12,000 mi) at 10 knots (19 km/h; 12 mph)
- Complement: 742–764
- Armament: 2 × 305 mm (12 in)/40 guns; 12 × 203 mm (8 in)/45 guns; 24 × 76 mm (3 in)/40 guns; 2 × 450 mm (17.7 in) torpedo tubes
- Armor: Belt: 250 mm (9.8 in); Turrets: 203 mm (8 in); Decks: 38 mm (1.5 in); Conning tower: 254 mm (10 in)

Napoli was a Regina Elena-class pre-dreadnought battleship built for the Italian Regia Marina (Royal Navy) in 1903–08. She was the last member of the four-ship class, which included the lead ship Regina Elena, Vittorio Emanuele, and Roma. Napoli was armed with a main battery of two 305 mm (12 in) and twelve 203 mm (8 in) guns, and was capable of a top speed of 21 knots (39 km/h; 24 mph).

Napoli saw action in the Italo-Turkish War in 1911 and 1912; she took part in the attack on Derna, Libya, and the amphibious assaults on the islands of Rhodes and the Dodecanese in the Aegean Sea. Napoli remained in service during World War I in 1915–1918, but saw no action as a result of the cautious policies of both the Italian and Austro-Hungarian navies. She remained in the Italian inventory until she was stricken from the naval register in August 1926 and was subsequently broken up for scrap.

== Design ==
The design for the Regina Elena class was prepared by the noted naval engineer, Vittorio Cuniberti, then the Chief Engineer of the Italian Regia Marina (Royal Navy). The Navy specified a vessel that would be more powerful than contemporary armored cruisers and faster than foreign pre-dreadnought battleships on a displacement of no more than 13,000 long tons (13,210 t). The first two vessels—Regina Elena and Vittorio Emanuele—were ordered for the 1901 fiscal year, and the final pair—Roma and Napoli—were authorized the following year.

=== Characteristics ===
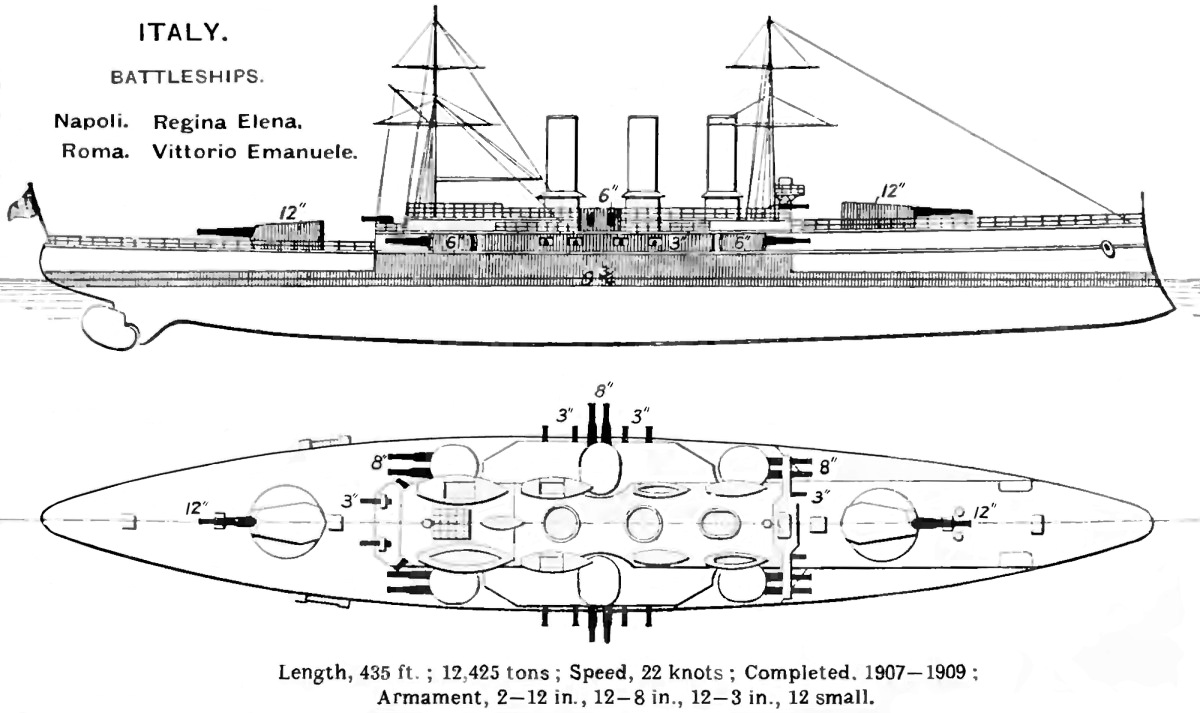
A line drawing of the Regina Elena-class battleships from the 1912 edition of Brassey's Naval Annual

Napoli was 144.6 meters (474 ft 5 in) long overall and had a beam of 22.4 m (73 ft 6 in) and a maximum draft of 8.58 m (28 ft 2 in). The ship had a slightly inverted bow and a long forecastle deck that extended past the main mast. She displaced 13,774 long tons (13,995 t) at full load. Napoli had a crew of 742–764 officers and enlisted men.

Her propulsion system consisted of two vertical four-cylinder triple-expansion steam engines, each driving a screw propeller. Steam for the engines was provided by twenty-eight coal-fired Babcock & Wilcox boilers that were vented into three funnels. The ship's propulsion system was rated at 19,618 indicated horsepower (14,629 kW) and provided a top speed of 22.15 knots (41.02 km/h; 25.49 mph) and a range of approximately 10,000 nautical miles (19,000 km; 12,000 mi) at 10 knots (19 km/h; 12 mph).

As built, the ship was armed with a main battery of two 305 mm (12 in) 40-caliber guns placed in two single gun turrets, one forward and one aft. The ship was also equipped with a secondary battery of twelve 203 mm (8 in) 45-cal. guns in six twin turrets amidships. Close-range defense against torpedo boats was provided by a battery of twenty-four 76 mm (3 in) 40-cal. guns in casemates and pivot mounts. Napoli was also equipped with two 450 mm (17.7 in) torpedo tubes placed in the hull below the waterline.

Napoli was protected with Krupp steel manufactured in Terni. The main belt was 250 mm (9.8 in) thick, and the deck was 38 mm (1.5 in) thick. The conning tower was protected by 254 mm (10 in) of armor plating. The main battery guns had 203 mm thick plating, and the secondary gun turrets had 152 mm (6 in) thick sides.

== Service history ==
The keel for Napoli was laid down at the Regio Cantiere di Castellammare di Stabia shipyard in Castellammare di Stabia on 21 October 1903. She was launched on 10 September 1905, and completed on 1 August 1908. Napoli served in the active duty squadron through 1910, which included her three sisters and the two Regina Margherita-class battleships. At the time, these six battleships represented Italy's front-line battle fleet. (Note: These were all pre-dreadnought battleships, and were thus obsolescent by this period, but Italy's first dreadnought, Dante Alighieri, did not enter service until 1913.) The active duty squadron was typically in service for seven months of the year for training; the rest of the year they were placed in reserve.

=== Italo-Turkish War ===
Illustration of Napoli c. 1908, by Oscar Parkes

On 29 September 1911, Italy declared war on the Ottoman Empire in order to seize Libya. For the duration of the conflict, Napoli served in the 1st Division of the 1st Squadron with her three sister ships, under the command of Vice Admiral Augusto Aubry. After the outbreak of war, Napoli, her sister Roma, and the armored cruisers Pisa and Amalfi, were sent to blockade Tripoli in North Africa. On 2 October, the battleship Benedetto Brin and the training squadron arrived to relieve Napoli and the other ships, which thereafter left to rejoin the flagship, Vittorio Emanuele.

On 15 October, Napoli, which had been detached to reinforce the armored cruisers in the 2nd Division, 1st Squadron, arrived in Derna, Libya in company with several troopships. After a request sent to the defending Ottoman garrison to surrender was rejected, Napoli and the armored cruisers bombarded the town. In the span of 30 minutes, they had razed the town. At 14:00, the Italians attempted to land a contingent of 500 infantry, but heavy Turkish fire repulsed the assault, which prompted further bombardment from the Italian fleet. On 18 October, the Turks retreated from the town, which was thereafter occupied by the Italian army. In the meantime, Napoli had rejoined the 1st Division, and on 18 October, the unit had escorted a convoy of troopships to Benghazi. The Italian fleet bombarded the city the next morning after the Ottoman garrison refused to surrender. During the bombardment, parties from the ships and the infantry from the troopships went ashore. The Italians quickly forced the Ottomans to withdraw into the city by evening. After a short siege, the Ottoman forces withdrew on 29 October, leaving the city to the Italians.

In November, the Ottomans launched a major attempt to retake the town. Toward the end of the month, the Italians launched a counter-attack that consisted of three battalions of infantry and 150 men from Napoli. By December, Napoli and the other ships of the 1st Squadron were dispersed in the ports of Cyrenaica; Napoli remained in Derna. In early 1912, most of the fleet, including Napoli, withdrew to Italy for repairs and refit, leaving only a small force of cruisers and light craft to patrol the North African coast. On 13 April, the 1st Division left Taranto, bound for the island of Rhodes. Meanwhile, the 3rd Division escorted a convoy of troopships from Tobruk to the island. The Italian heavy ships demonstrated off the city of Rhodes while the transports landed the expeditionary force 10 miles (16 km) to the south on 4 May; the soldiers quickly advanced on the city, supported by artillery fire from the Italian fleet. The Turks surrendered the city the following day.

Between 8 and 20 May, Napoli was involved in the seizure of several islands in the Dodecanese between Crete, Rhodes, and Samos. In June, Napoli and the rest of the 1st Division was stationed at Rhodes. Over the next two months, the ships cruised in the Aegean to prevent the Turks from attempting to launch their own amphibious operations to retake the islands Italy had seized in May. The 1st Division returned to Italy in late August for repairs and refitting, and were replaced by the battleships of the 2nd Squadron. The 1st Division left port on 14 October, but was recalled later that day, when the Ottomans had agreed to sign a peace treaty to end the war.

=== World War I ===
Italy declared neutrality after the outbreak of World War I in August 1914, but by July 1915, the Triple Entente had convinced the Italians to enter the war against the Central Powers. Italy's traditional naval rival, the Austro-Hungarian Navy, was the primary opponent in the conflict, and lay directly across the narrow Adriatic Sea. Admiral Paolo Thaon di Revel, the Italian Naval Chief of Staff, understood that Austro-Hungarian submarines presented too serious a threat to his capital ships for him to mount an active fleet policy. Instead, Revel decided to implement blockade at the relatively safer southern end of the Adriatic with the battle fleet, while smaller vessels, such as the MAS boats conducted raids on Austro-Hungarian ships and installations. Meanwhile, Revel's battleships would be preserved to confront the Austro-Hungarian battle fleet in the event that it sought a decisive engagement. As a result, the ship was not particularly active during the war.

During the war, Napoli and her three sisters were assigned to the 2nd Division. They spent much of the war rotating between the bases at Taranto, Brindisi, and Valona, but did not see combat. On 14–15 May 1917, three light cruisers of the Austro-Hungarian Navy raided the Otranto Barrage; in the ensuring Battle of the Strait of Otranto, Napoli and her sisters raised steam to assist the Allied warships, but the Italian commander refused to permit them to join the battle for fear of risking their loss in the submarine-infested Adriatic.

In early 1922, the world's major navies, including Italy, signed the Washington Naval Treaty. According to the terms of the treaty, Italy could keep Napoli and her three sisters, along with the newer dreadnought battleships. Due to the small size and age of the ships, particularly in comparison to the modern dreadnoughts, the Italians could have kept the ships in service indefinitely. They could not, however, be replaced by new battleships under the normal practice of the Treaty system, which provided for replacements after a ship was 20 years old. Napoli was retained for a few years, but was stricken from the naval register on 3 August 1926 and sold for scrap.
