= Italian battleship Roma (1907) =

Pre-dreadnought battleship of the Italian Royal Navy

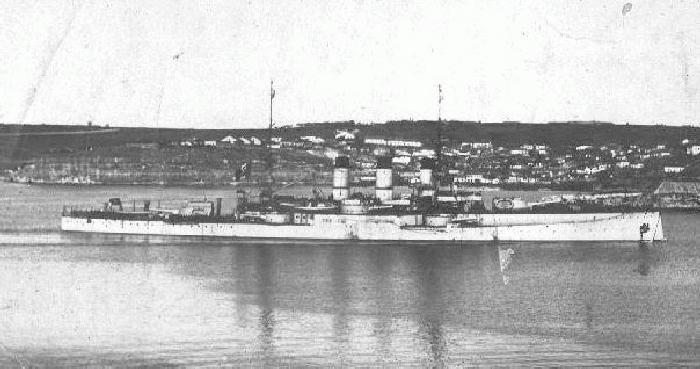
- Roma at anchor in Constantinople (November 1918)

History

Italy
- Name: Roma
- Namesake: Rome
- Operator: Regia Marina (Italian Royal Navy)
- Builder: Arsenale di La Spezia
- Laid down: 20 September 1903
- Launched: 21 April 1907
- Completed: 17 December 1908
- Stricken: 3 September 1926
- Fate: Broken up for scrap

General characteristics
- Class & type: Regina Elena-class battleship
- Displacement: 13,772 long tons (13,993 t)
- Length: 144.6 m (474 ft)
- Beam: 22.4 m (73 ft)
- Draft: 8.58 m (28.1 ft)
- Installed power: 28 × Babcock & Wilcox boilers; 21,968 ihp (16,382 kW)
- Propulsion: 2 × triple-expansion steam engines; 2 × screw propellers
- Speed: 22.15 knots (41.02 km/h; 25.49 mph)
- Range: 10,000 nmi (19,000 km; 12,000 mi) at 10 knots (19 km/h; 12 mph)
- Complement: 742–764
- Armament: 2 × 305 mm (12 in)/40 guns; 12 × 203 mm (8 in)/45 guns; 24 × 76 mm (3 in)/40 guns; 2 × 450 mm (17.7 in) torpedo tubes
- Armor: Belt: 250 mm (9.8 in); Turrets: 203 mm (8 in); Decks: 38 mm (1.5 in); Conning tower: 254 mm (10 in)

Roma was an Italian pre-dreadnought battleship, laid down in 1903, launched in 1907 and completed in 1908. She was the third member of the Regina Elena class, which included three other vessels: Regina Elena, Napoli, and Vittorio Emanuele. Roma was armed with a main battery of two 305 mm (12 in) guns and twelve 203 mm (8 in) guns. She was quite fast for the period, with a top speed of nearly 21 knots (39 km/h; 24 mph).

Roma saw action in the Italo-Turkish War in 1911 and 1912; she took part in the attack on Benghazi, and the amphibious assaults on the islands of Rhodes and the Dodecanese in the Aegean Sea. Roma remained in service during World War I in 1915–1918, but saw no action as a result of the cautious policies of both the Italian and Austro-Hungarian navies. She remained in the Italian inventory until she was stricken from the naval register in September 1926 and was subsequently broken up for scrap.

== Design ==
The design for the Regina Elena class was prepared by the noted naval engineer, Vittorio Cuniberti, then the Chief Engineer of the Italian Regia Marina (Royal Navy). The Navy specified a vessel that would be more powerful than contemporary armored cruisers and faster than foreign pre-dreadnought battleships on a displacement of no more than 13,000 long tons (13,210 t). The first two vessels—Regina Elena and Vittorio Emanuele—were ordered for the 1901 fiscal year, and the final pair—Napoli and Roma—were authorized the following year.

=== Characteristics ===
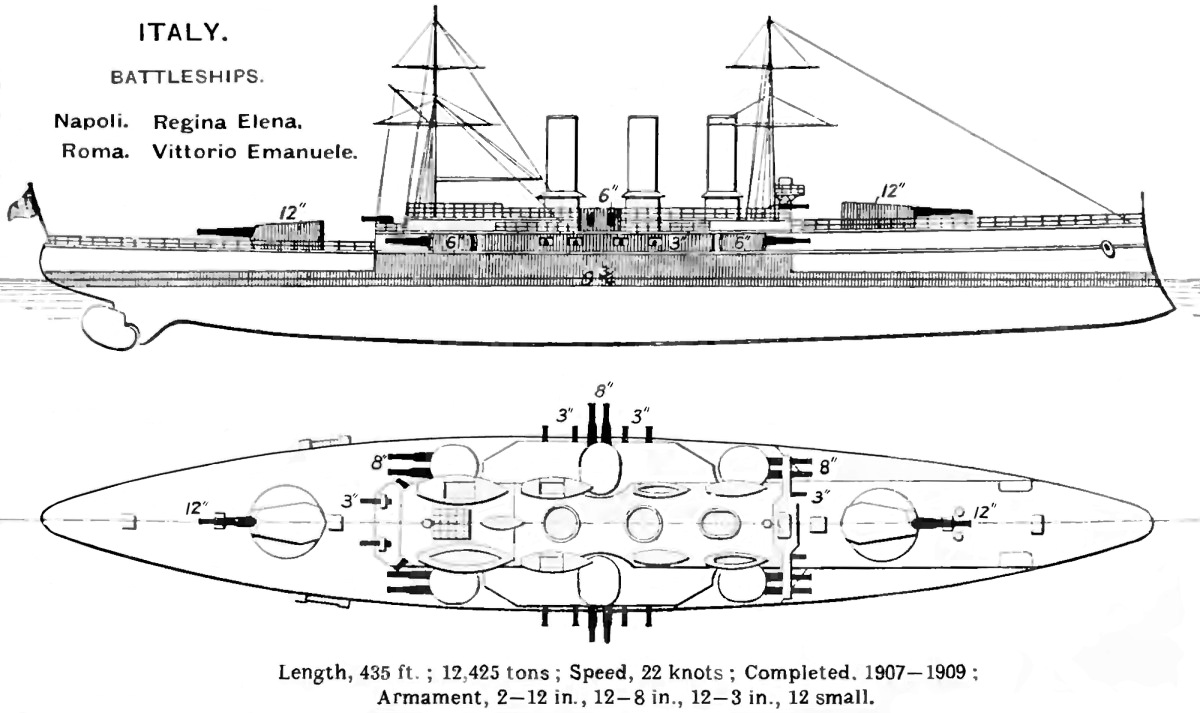
A line drawing of the Regina Elena-class battleships from the 1912 edition of Brassey's Naval Annual

Roma was 144.6 meters (474 ft 5 in) long overall and had a beam of 22.4 m (73 ft 6 in) and a maximum draft of 8.58 m (28 ft 2 in). She displaced 13,772 long tons (13,993 t) at full load. The ship had a slightly inverted bow and a long forecastle deck that extended past the main mast. Roma had a crew of 742–764 officers and enlisted men.

Her propulsion system consisted of two vertical triple-expansion steam engines, each driving a screw propeller. Steam for the engines was provided by twenty-eight coal-fired Babcock & Wilcox boilers that were vented into three funnels. The ship's propulsion system was rated at 21,968 indicated horsepower (16,382 kW) and provided a top speed of 21.39 knots (39.61 km/h; 24.62 mph) and a range of approximately 10,000 nautical miles (19,000 km; 12,000 mi) at 10 knots (19 km/h; 12 mph).

As built, the ship was armed with a main battery of two 305 mm (12 in) 40-caliber guns placed in two single gun turrets, one forward and one aft. The ship was also equipped with a secondary battery of twelve 203 mm (8 in) 45-cal. guns in six twin turrets amidships. Close-range defense against torpedo boats was provided by a battery of twenty-four 76 mm (3 in) 40-cal. guns in casemates and pivot mounts. Roma was also equipped with two 450 mm (17.7 in) torpedo tubes placed in the hull below the waterline.

Roma was protected with Krupp steel manufactured in Terni. The main belt was 250 mm (9.8 in) thick, and the deck was 38 mm (1.5 in) thick. The conning tower was protected by 254 mm (10 in) of armor plating. The main battery guns had 203 mm thick plating, and the secondary gun turrets had 152 mm (6 in) thick sides.

== Service history ==
Roma was laid down at the Arsenale di La Spezia shipyard in La Spezia on 20 August 1903 and launched on 21 April 1907. After fitting-out work, the ship was completed on 17 December 1908. After her commissioning, Roma was assigned to the active duty squadron, where she remained through 1910, which included her three sisters and the two Regina Margherita-class battleships. At the time, these six battleships represented Italy's front-line battle fleet. (Note: These were all pre-dreadnought battleships, and were thus obsolescent by this period, but Italy's first dreadnought, Dante Alighieri, did not enter service until 1913.) The active duty squadron was typically in service for seven months of the year for training; the rest of the year they were placed in reserve.

=== Italo-Turkish War ===
Italy declared war on the Ottoman Empire in order to seize Libya and other Ottoman holdings in the Mediterranean on 29 September 1911. For the duration of the conflict, Roma served in the 1st Division of the 1st Squadron with her three sister ships, under the command of Vice Admiral Augusto Aubry. On 30 September, Roma, her sister Vittorio Emanuele, and the armored cruiser Pisa conducted a sweep in the Aegean, in the hopes of catching the Turkish training squadron, which was at the time returning from the Levant to Constantinople. Shortly thereafter, Roma, her sister Napoli, and the armored cruisers Pisa and Amalfi conducted a blockade of the port of Tripoli. The ships were relieved on 3 October by the battleships Benedetto Brin and the three vessels of the Re Umberto class.

On 18 October, Roma and the rest of the 1st Division escorted a convoy of eight troopships to Benghazi. The Italian fleet bombarded the city the next morning after the Ottoman garrison refused to surrender. During the bombardment, parties from the ships and the infantry from the troopships went ashore. The Italians quickly forced the Ottomans to withdraw into the city by evening. After a short siege, the Ottoman forces withdrew on 29 October, leaving the city to the Italians. By December, Roma and the other ships of the 1st Squadron were dispersed in the ports of Cyrenaica. Roma remained stationed at Benghazi along with her sister Regina Elena, along with the armored cruiser San Marco and the torpedo cruiser Agordat. While there, the ships assisted in the defense of the recently conquered city from Turkish counter-attacks. In early 1912, Roma and the bulk of the fleet withdrew to Italy for maintenance necessary after several months of combat operations. Only a small force of cruisers and light craft was left to patrol the North African coast, since the Ottoman fleet remained confined to port.

The 1st Division left Taranto on 13 April for a demonstration off the Anatolian coast, along with the battleships of the 3rd Division, which had left from Tobruk. The two squadrons met on 17 April off the island of Stampalia, after which the combined fleet steamed north. The following day, the ships cut submarine telegraph cables between Imbros, Tenedos, Lemnos, Salonica, and the Dardanelles. The ships then steamed to the entrance to the Dardanelles in an attempt to lure out the Ottoman fleet. When the Ottoman coastal fortifications began to take the Italian ships under fire, the Italians returned fire and inflicted serious damage on them. On 19 April, Roma and most of the fleet returned to Italy, leaving only Pisa, Amalfi, and a flotilla of torpedo boats to cruise off the Ottoman coast.

On 30 April, the 1st Division again departed from Taranto, bound for the island of Rhodes. Meanwhile, the 3rd Division battleships escorted a convoy of troopships from Tobruk to the island. The Italian heavy ships cruised off the city of Rhodes while the transports landed the expeditionary force 10 miles (16 km) to the south on 4 May; the soldiers quickly advanced on the city, supported by artillery fire from the Italian fleet. The Turks surrendered the city the following day. Between 8 and 20 May, Roma was involved in the seizure of several islands in the Dodecanese between Crete, Rhodes, and Samos. In June, Roma and the rest of the 1st Division was stationed at Rhodes. Over the next two months, the ships cruised in the Aegean to prevent the Turks from attempting to launch their own amphibious operations to retake the islands Italy had seized in May. The 1st Division returned to Italy in late August for repairs and refitting, and were replaced by the battleships of the 2nd Squadron. The 1st Division left port on 14 October, but was recalled later that day, when the Ottomans had agreed to sign a peace treaty to end the war.

=== World War I ===
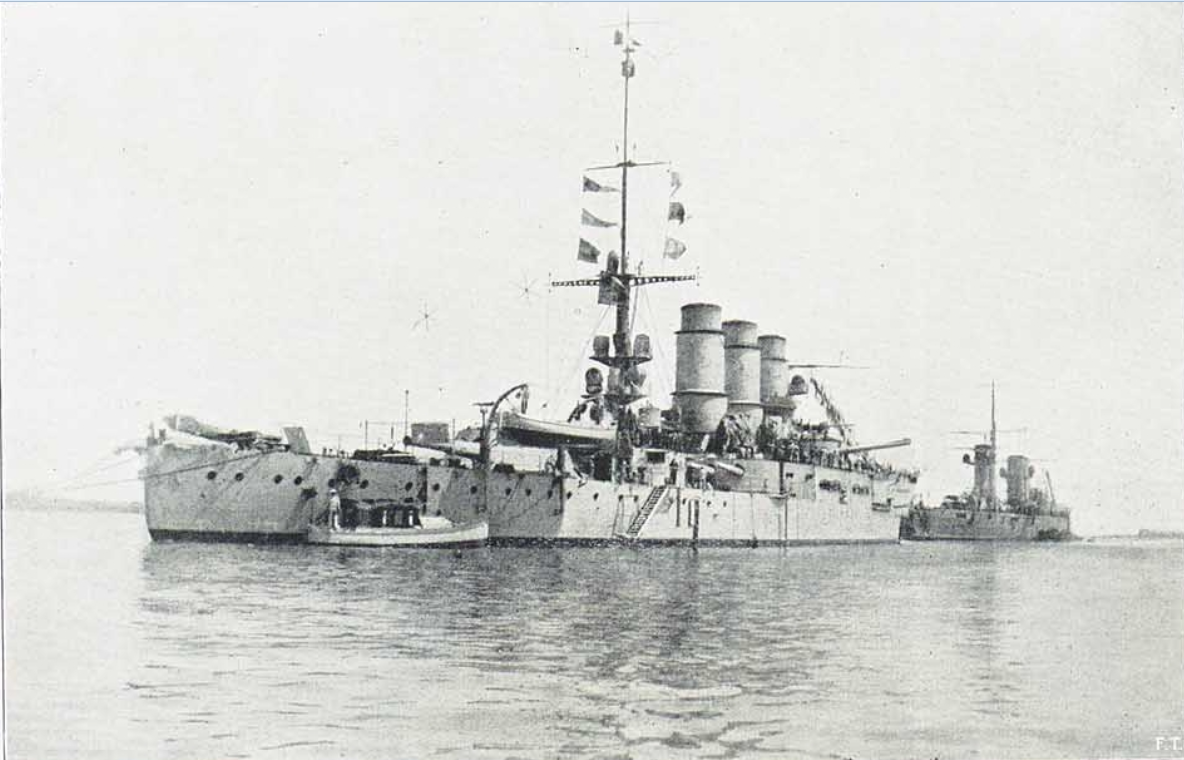
Roma during World War I.

Italy declared neutrality after the outbreak of World War I in August 1914, but by July 1915, the Triple Entente had convinced the Italians to enter the war against the Central Powers with promises of territory acquisition in Italia irredenta ("unredeemed Italy"). The Austro-Hungarian Navy, which had been Italy's primary rival for decades, was the primary opponent in the conflict. The Austro-Hungarian battle fleet lay in its harbors directly across the narrow Adriatic Sea. Admiral Paolo Thaon di Revel, the Italian naval chief of staff, believed that Austro-Hungarian submarines and minelayers could operate too effectively in the narrow waters of the Adriatic. The threat from these underwater weapons to his capital ships was too serious for him to use the fleet in an active way. Instead, Revel decided to implement blockade at the relatively safer southern end of the Adriatic with the battle fleet, while smaller vessels, such as the MAS boats, conducted raids on Austro-Hungarian ships and installations. Meanwhile, Revel's battleships would be preserved to confront the Austro-Hungarian battle fleet in the event that it sought a decisive engagement. As a result, Roma and her sisters did not see significant action during the war.

For the duration of the conflict, Roma and her three sisters were assigned to the 2nd Division. They spent much of the war rotating between the bases at Taranto, Brindisi, and Valona, but did not see combat. In February 1916, Roma and Regina Elena sortied briefly in response to mistaken reports that the Austro-Hungarian fleet was at sea. On 14–15 May 1917, three light cruisers of the Austro-Hungarian Navy raided the Otranto Barrage; in the ensuing Battle of the Strait of Otranto, Roma and her sisters raised steam to assist the Allied warships, but the Italian commander refused to permit them to join the battle for fear of risking their loss in the submarine-infested Adriatic.

=== Postwar career ===
In November 1918, Roma participated in the occupation of Constantinople following the surrender of the Ottomans. She and Agordat joined a fleet of British, French, and Greek warships that entered the Dardanelles and landed troops to occupy the city. Roma embarked on a cruise to South American waters in 1920–1921, and in January 1921, she visited Rio de Janeiro, Brazil, where she met the British cruiser HMS Southampton and the Spanish cruiser Reina Regente.

The world's major naval powers, including Italy, signed the Washington Naval Treaty in early 1922 in an effort to stop naval arms races, which were seen as one of the causes of the Great War. According to the terms of the treaty, Italy could keep Roma and her three sisters, along with the newer dreadnought battleships. Due to the small size and age of the ships the Italians could have kept the ships in service indefinitely. They could not, however, be replaced by new battleships under the normal practice of the Treaty system, which provided for replacements after a ship was 20 years old. Roma was retained for only a few years after the signing of the treaty. On 3 September 1926, Roma was stricken from the naval register and subsequently broken up for scrap.
