= SMS Radetzky =

Three ships of the Austrian and Austro-Hungarian Navy have been named SMS Radetzky:

- SMS Radetzky (1854), a screw frigate destroyed in an accidental explosion in 1869
- SMS Radetzky (1872), a screw frigate
- SMS Radetzky (1909), a pre-dreadnought battleship
