= Italian battleship Dante Alighieri =

Dreadnought battleship of the Italian Royal Navy

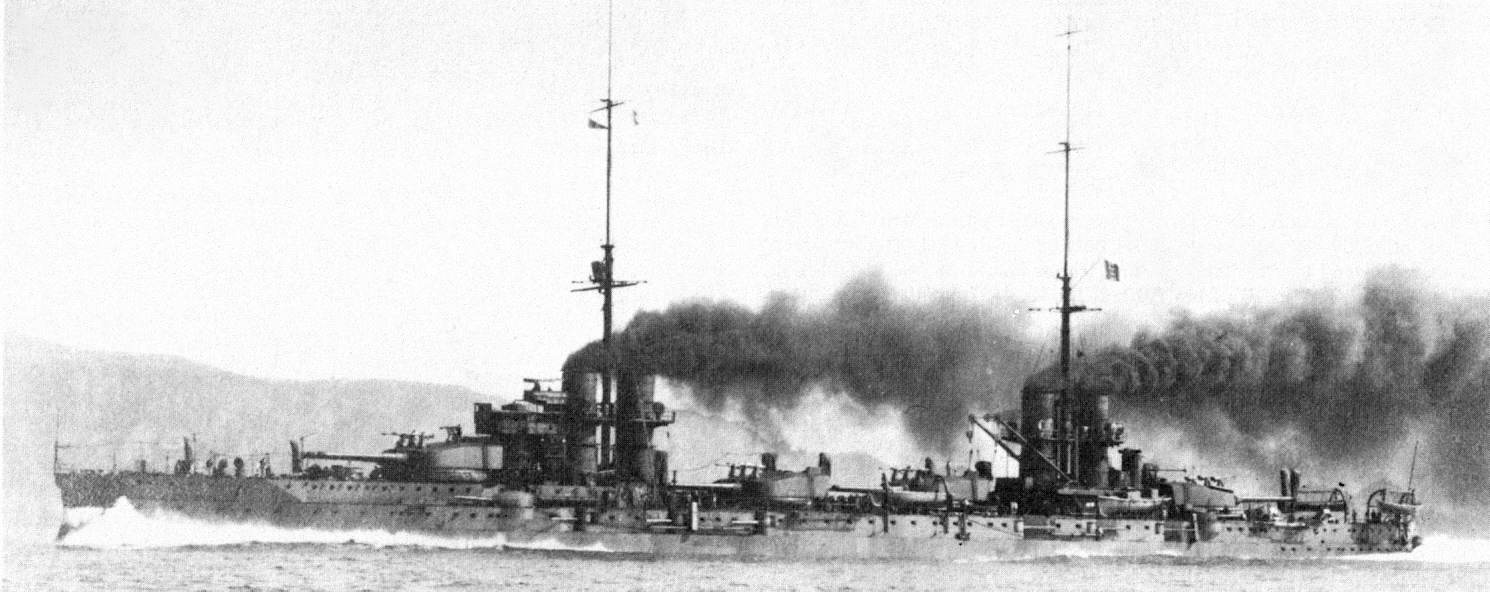
- Dante Alighieri on 29 March 1914

Class overview
- Operators: Regia Marina
- Preceded by: Regina Elena class
- Succeeded by: Conte di Cavour class
- Built: 1909–1913
- In commission: 1913–1928
- Completed: 1
- Scrapped: 1

History

Italy
- Name: Dante Alighieri
- Namesake: Dante Alighieri
- Builder: Regio Cantiere di Castellammare di Stabia, Castellammare di Stabia
- Laid down: 6 June 1909
- Launched: 20 August 1910
- Completed: 15 January 1913
- Stricken: 1 July 1928
- Fate: Scrapped, 1928

General characteristics
- Type: Dreadnought battleship
- Displacement: 19,552 long tons (19,866 t) (normal)
- Length: 168.1 m (551 ft 6 in) (o/a)
- Beam: 26.6 m (87 ft 3 in)
- Draught: 8.8 m (28 ft 10 in)
- Installed power: 23 × water-tube boilers; 32,190 shp (24,000 kW)
- Propulsion: 4 × shafts; 4 × steam turbines
- Speed: 22 knots (41 km/h; 25 mph)
- Range: 4,800 nmi (8,900 km; 5,500 mi) at 10 knots (19 km/h; 12 mph)
- Complement: 981 officers and enlisted men
- Armament: 4 × triple 305 mm (12 in) guns; 12 × single, 4 × twin 120 mm (4.7 in) guns; 13 × single 76.2 mm (3 in) guns; 3 × 450 mm (17.7 in) torpedo tubes
- Armor: Waterline belt: 254 mm (10 in); Deck: 38 mm (1.5 in); Gun turrets: 254 mm (10 in)

Dante Alighieri was the first dreadnought battleship built for the Regia Marina (Royal Italian Navy) and was completed in 1913. The ship served as a flagship during World War I, but saw very little action other than the Second Battle of Durazzo in 1918 during which she did not engage enemy forces. She never fired her guns in anger during her career. Dante Alighieri was refitted in 1923, stricken from the Navy List five years later and subsequently sold for scrap.

== Description ==
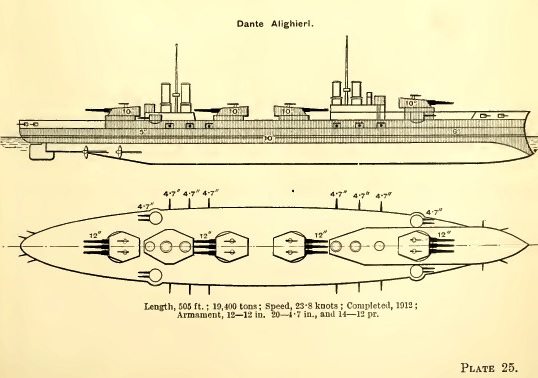
Right elevation and plan of Dante Alighieri from Brassey's Naval Annual 1923; the shaded areas are armored

Dante Alighieri was designed by Rear Admiral Engineer Edoardo Masdea, Chief Constructor of the Regia Marina, based on the ideas of General Vittorio Cuniberti who advocated a battleship with main guns of a single caliber and optimized for broadside fire. In addition, the ship's superstructure and funnels were to be kept to a minimum.

The dreadnought was 158.4 meters (519 ft 8 in) long at the waterline, and 168.1 meters (551 ft 6 in) overall. The ship had a beam of 26.6 meters (87 ft 3 in), and a draft of 8.8 meters (28 ft 10 in). She displaced 19,552 tonnes (19,243 long tons) at normal load, and 21,600 tonnes (21,300 long tons) at deep load. Dante Alighieri had two rudders, one behind the other, and a crew of 31 officers and 950 enlisted men.

The ship was propelled by four propeller shafts driven by Parsons steam turbines. Steam for the turbines was provided by 23 Blechynden water-tube boilers, seven of which burned oil and the remaining sixteen burned a mixture of oil and coal. The boilers were widely separated in two compartments, each with two funnels, and the turbines were positioned between the two center turrets. Designed to reach a maximum speed of 23 knots (43 km/h; 26 mph) from 35,000 shaft horsepower (26,000 kW), Dante Alighieri failed to reach this goal on her sea trials, making a maximum speed of only 22.83 knots (42.28 km/h; 26.27 mph) from 32,190 shp (24,000 kW). The ship could store a maximum of 3,000 tonnes (2,953 long tons) of coal and an unknown quantity of fuel oil that gave her a range of 4,800 nautical miles (8,900 km; 5,500 mi) at 10 kn (19 km/h; 12 mph), and 1,000 nmi (1,900 km; 1,200 mi) at 22 knots (41 km/h; 25 mph).

Dante Alighieri had a complete waterline armor belt that had a maximum thickness of 254 millimeters (10 in). The ship's armored deck was 38 mm (1.5 in) thick. The main turrets were protected by a maximum of 254 millimeters of armor while the secondary turrets and the casemates had 98 millimeters (3.9 in) of armor. The conning tower had walls 305 millimeters thick.

=== Armament ===
Dante Alighieri's main armament consisted of a dozen 46-caliber 305-millimeter (12 inch) guns, in four triple-gun turrets positioned on the ship's centerline. None of the turrets were superfiring. While the later classes of battleships and battlecruisers designed for the Imperial Russian Navy shared the turret layout of the Dante Alighieri, all surviving evidence shows that the Russians decided on this layout for their own reasons.

Sources disagree regarding these guns' performance, but naval historian Giorgio Giorgerini claims that they fired 452-kilogram (996 lb) armor-piercing (AP) projectiles at the rate of one round per minute and that they had a muzzle velocity of 840 metres per second (2,800 ft/s) which gave a maximum range of 24,000 meters (26,000 yd). (Note: Friedman provides a variety of sources that show armor-piercing shell weights ranging from 416.92 to 452.32 kilograms (919.16 to 997.2 lb) and muzzle velocities around 861 metres per second (2,820 ft/s).)

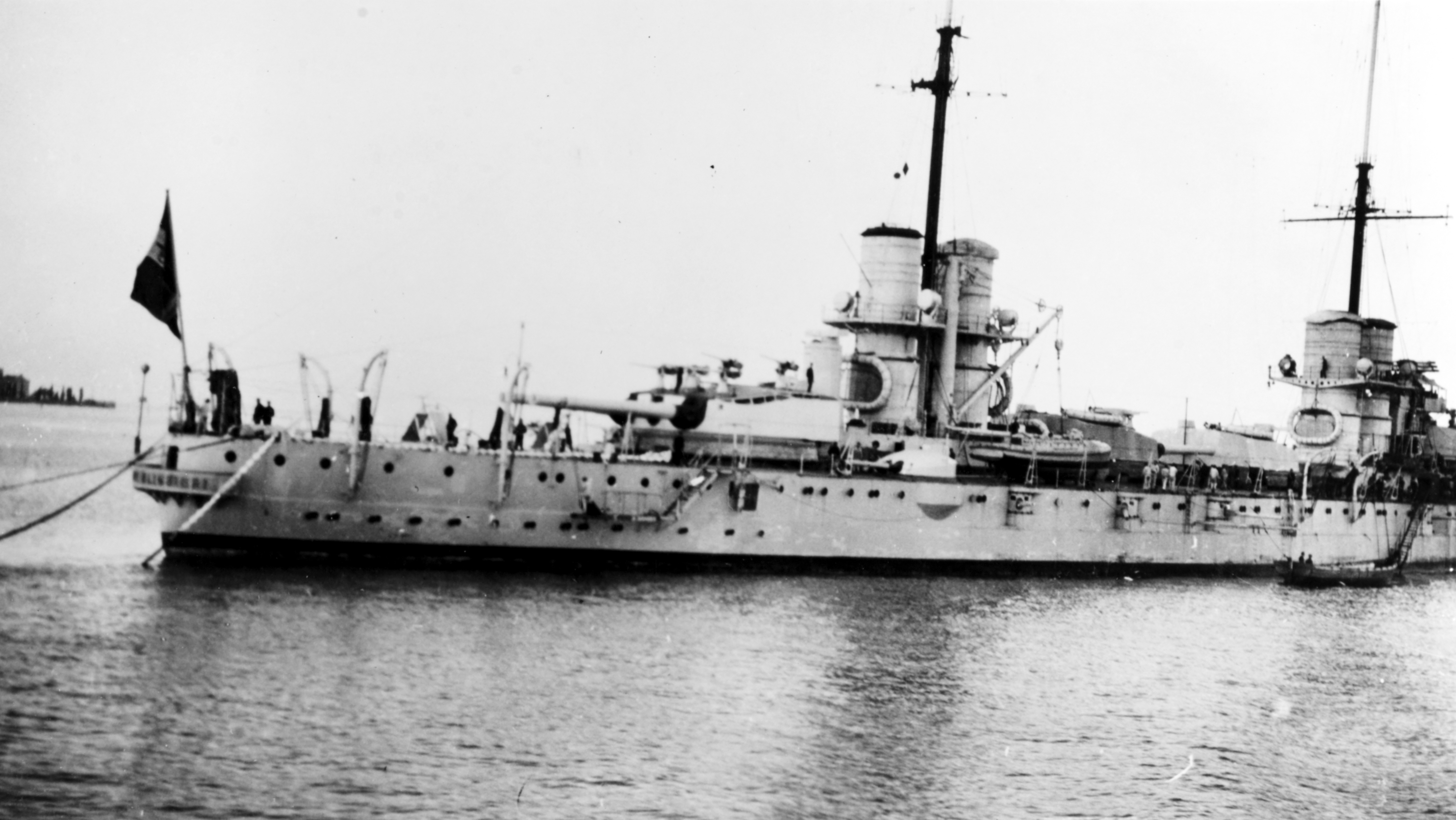
Dante Alighieri in 1919

The ship's secondary armament consisted of twenty 50-caliber 120-millimeter (4.7 in) guns. Eight of these guns were fitted in twin-gun turrets abreast the forward and aft main gun turrets while the remaining 12 guns were mounted in casemates on the sides of the hull. These guns could depress to −10 degrees and had a maximum elevation of +15 degrees; they had a rate of fire of six shots per minute. They could fire a 22.1-kilogram (49 lb) high-explosive projectile with a muzzle velocity of 850 meters per second (2,800 ft/s) to a maximum distance of 12,000 yards (11,000 m). For defense against torpedo boats, Dante Alighieri carried thirteen 50-caliber 76 mm (3 in) guns mounted on the turret tops. These guns had the same range of elevation as the secondary guns, although their rate of fire was higher at 10 rounds per minute. They fired a 6-kilogram (13 lb) AP projectile with a muzzle velocity of 815 meters per second (2,670 ft/s) to a maximum distance of 10,000 yards (9,100 m). (Note: Sources disagree as to the type of 76 mm gun used aboard Dante Alighieri. Fraccaroli maintains that they were the older 40-caliber guns and replaced in 1915 with the newer 50-caliber guns, but Preston and Friedman say that they were 50-caliber guns from the beginning.) The ship was also fitted with three submerged 45-centimeter (17.7 in) torpedo tubes, one on each broadside and the third in the stern.

== Construction and service ==
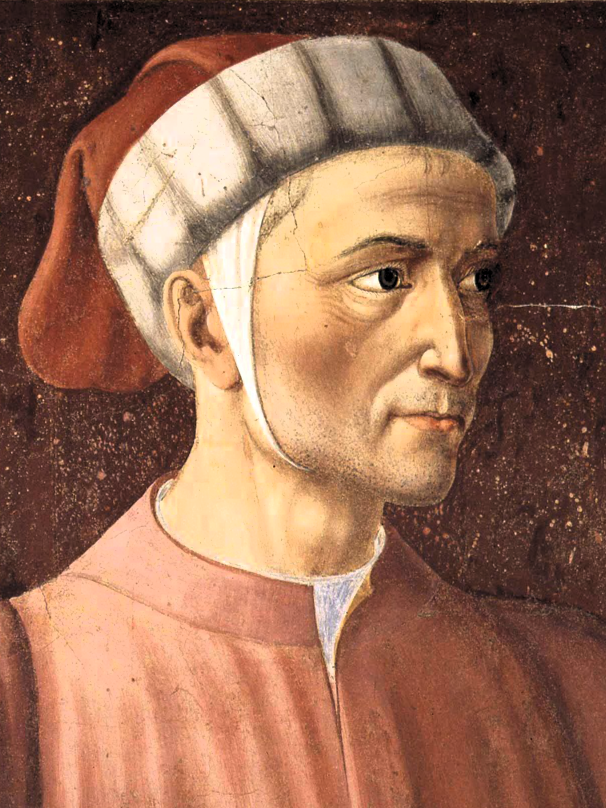
Dante Alighieri in Taranto

Dante Alighieri, named after the medieval Italian poet, was the only dreadnought battleship ever named for a poet. She was laid down at the naval shipyard in Castellammare di Stabia on 6 June 1909, launched on 20 August 1910, and completed on 15 January 1913. The ship was used to evaluate Curtiss floatplanes in 1913–14. When Italy entered World War I in May 1915, Dante Alighieri was the flagship of the 1st Battle Squadron based at Taranto and remained with the squadron through 1916. For the rest of the war, the ship was assigned to the Southern Adriatic and Ionian Sea forces. Under the command of Vice Admiral Paolo Thaon di Revel, the ship was positioned to intercept any Austro-Hungarian ships based at Cattaro if they sortied to attack the Allied ships bombarding Durazzo on 2 October 1918. The Austro-Hungarians remained in harbor and Dante Alighieri did not fire her guns during the battle.

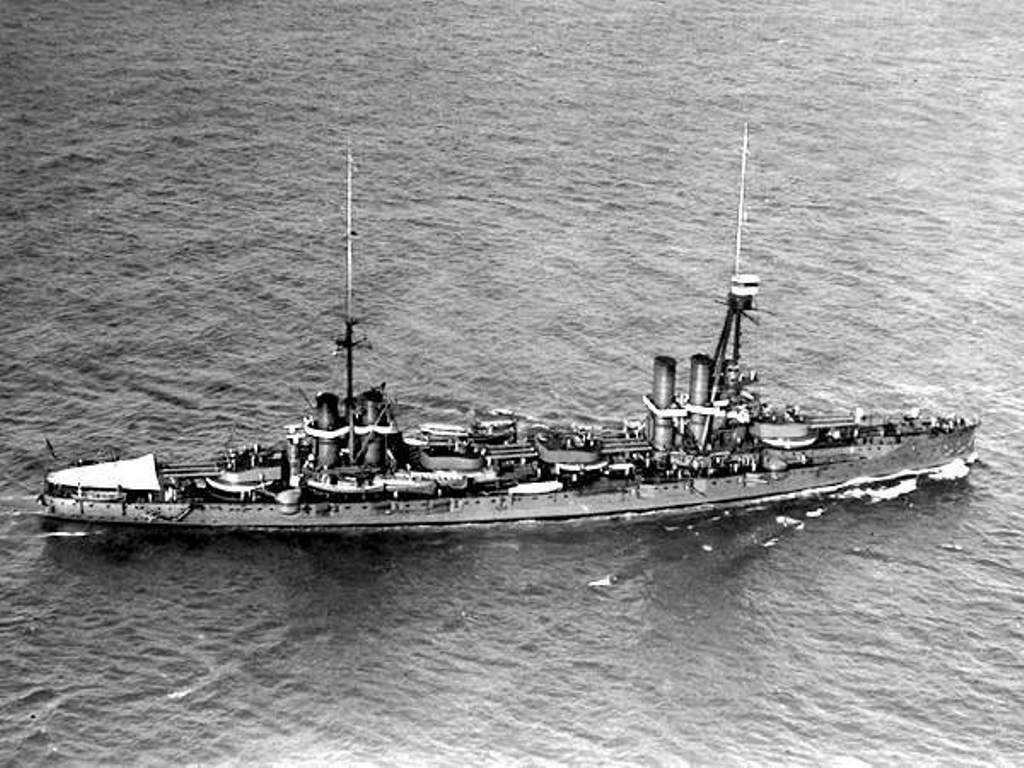
Dante Alighieri after being refitted, 1920s

King Victor Emmanuel III entertained delegates to the Genoa Conference aboard Dante Alighieri in 1922. The ship was refitted in 1923 with a tripod foremast and an aircraft flying-off platform on Turret No. 3, and her forward funnels were made taller to reduce smoke interference with the bridge. She tested a new fire-control system in 1924 at ranges up to 26,000 meters (28,000 yd); her new tripod mast was not sturdy enough for the weight of the system, but it was judged to be successful and subsequently installed in the Conte di Cavour-class battleships. That same year, the ship transported Benito Mussolini to Palermo, Sicily. The Italian economy had been weakened by fighting in World War I, and by the late 1920s it could no longer afford to maintain a sizable fleet. As a result, Admiral Giovanni Sechi decided to scrap Dante Alighieri and the salvaged battleship Leonardo da Vinci to reduce the naval budget. The ship was stricken on 1 July 1928 and was subsequently scrapped.
