= Vittorio Cuniberti =

Italian military officer and naval engineer

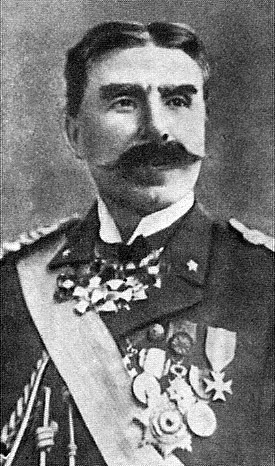
Vittorio Cuniberti

Vittorio Emilio Cuniberti (1854–1913) was an Italian military officer and naval engineer who envisioned the concept of the all big gun battleship, best exemplified by HMS Dreadnought.

== Life and career ==
Born in Turin, he joined the Genio Navale (the corps of the Regia Marina dedicated to shipbuilding) in 1878, and rose through the ranks until he became Major general in 1910. A collaborator of Italian admiral, naval engineer and politician Benedetto Brin, in 1899 he designed the Regina Elena-class battleships. He died in Rome.

== Cuniberti's article ==
Cuniberti's "ideal battleship"

Cuniberti is best known for an article he wrote for Jane's Fighting Ships in 1903, advocating a concept known as the "all-big-gun" fighting ship.

Up till then, the navies of the world built ships with a mixture of large and medium calibre guns. There was constant experimentation with calibres and layout.

The ship Cuniberti envisaged would be a "colossus" of the seas. His main idea was that this ship would carry only one calibre of gun, the biggest available, at the time 12 inch.

This heavily armoured colossus would be impervious to all but the 12-inch (305 mm) guns of the enemy. Cuniberti saw the enemy's small calibre guns as having no effect on his design. Cuniberti's "ideal ship" had twelve large calibre guns, and would have a significant advantage over the (usual) four of the enemy ship.

His ship would be fast, so that she could choose her point of attack.

Cuniberti saw this ship able to discharge such a heavy broadside, all of one large calibre, that she would engulf first one enemy ship, then move on to the next, and the next, disdainfully destroying an entire enemy fleet. He conjectured that the effect of a squadron of, say, six "colossi" would give a fleet such overwhelming power as to deter all possible opponents.

Naturally, there was a cost for such a ship. Part of Cuniberti's contention was that this colossus was available only to a "navy at the same time most potent and very rich".

Cuniberti proposed a design based on his ideas to the Italian government. The Italian government declined for budgetary reasons, but gave Cuniberti permission to write the article for Jane's Fighting Ships.

Cuniberti's article was published before the Battle of Tsushima, which vindicated his ideas. There, the real damage was inflicted by the large calibre guns of the Japanese fleet.

== Dreadnoughts ==
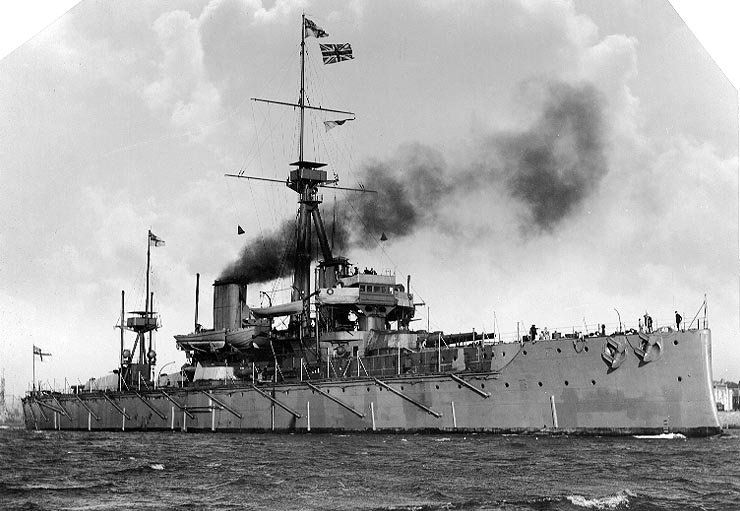
HMS Dreadnought

The political atmosphere in Britain at the time was explosive. For the first time since Trafalgar, there was a serious challenge to the Royal Navy. A short distance across the North Sea, the German Navy was rapidly building a powerful, modern fleet, behind which lay the overwhelming power of the German Army. In comparison, behind Britain's sea shield was a greatly outnumbered British Army.

Admiral Sir John Fisher, Royal Navy, ordered an all-big-gun ship with a speed of 21 knots, resulting in the revolutionary HMS Dreadnought. The ship was completed in a year and day and was launched in 1906. Dreadnought's speed was ensured by using the revolutionary Parsons' turbine engines.

Immediately this ship defined the era. It rendered all previous battleships obsolete, because ship to ship Dreadnought would sink them. Thereafter all battleships following its design would be referred to, generically, as "dreadnoughts".

=== Convergence ===
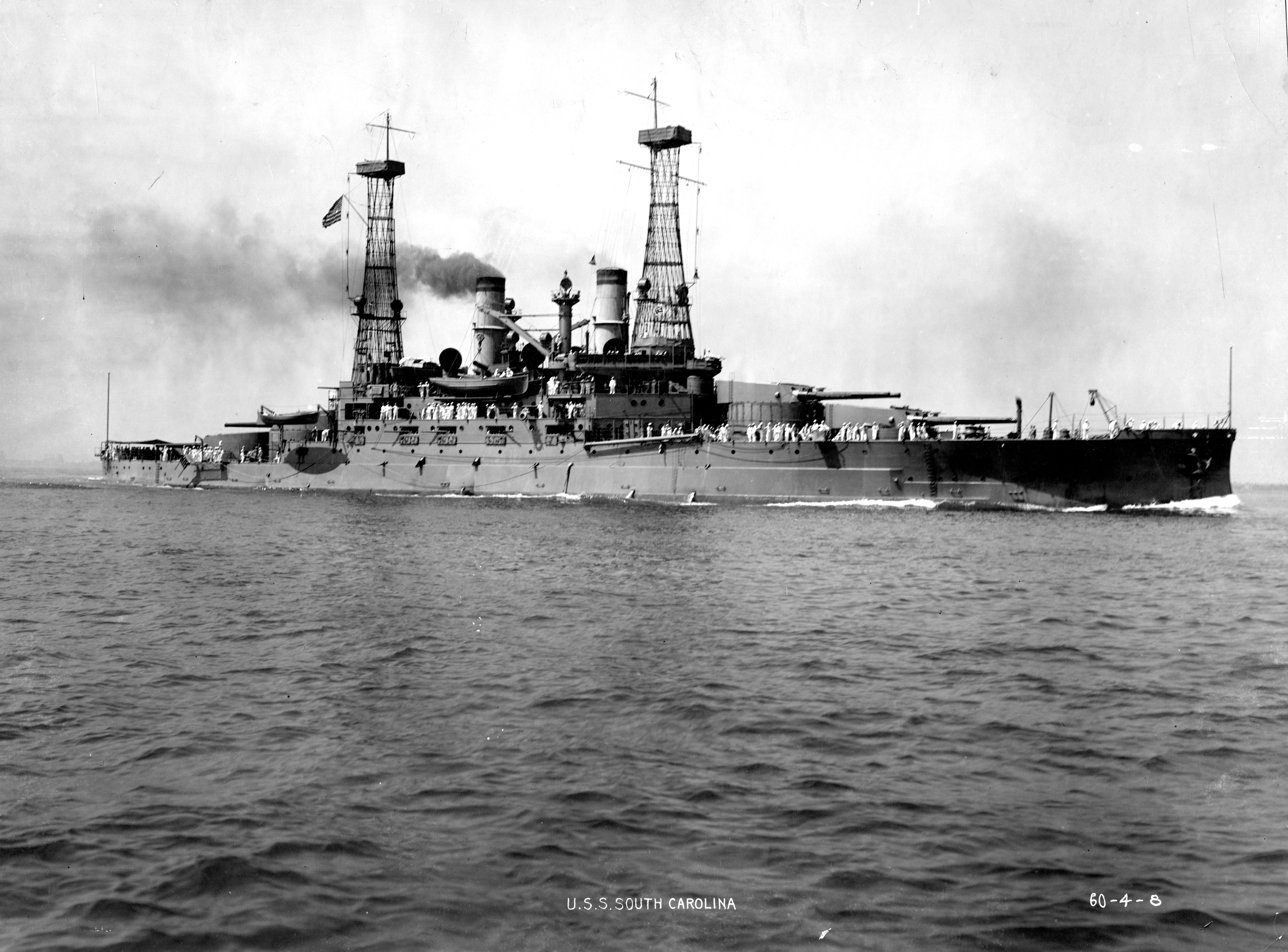
USS South Carolina

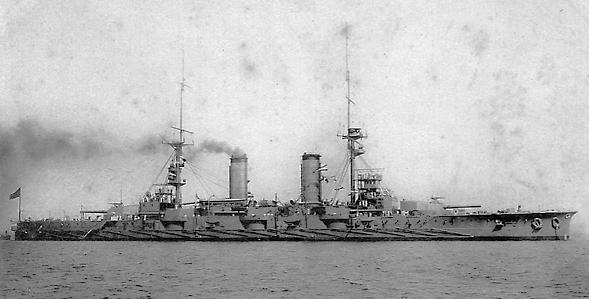
Japanese battleship Satsuma

Admiral Sir John Fisher never gave any credit to Cuniberti, or to any foreigner, although he surely knew of Cuniberti's article. However, before the publication of Cuniberti's article, most major navies, including the Royal Navy, were converging on the "all big gun battleship" design: the Americans were publishing articles about potential designs and the General Board was reviewing several options, but USS South Carolina and USS Michigan were not authorized until March 1905 (and then as repeat Connecticuts), and neither were laid down until December 1906. Neither were the Japanese building the Satsuma class, which wasn't ordered until 1904 and laid down in 1905 and 1906.

=== Cuniberti's influence on Russian dreadnoughts ===
After the launch of the Royal Navy's Dreadnought, Russia, along with all other major naval nations, saw its fleet of battleships rendered obsolete overnight. In Russia's case this was exacerbated by the losses suffered in the Russo-Japanese War. The Imperial Russian Navy was short of battleships.

The Gangut-class battleships were ordered. After a convoluted bidding process they were eventually built in Russia, with "technical assistance and supervision" by John Brown and Co., "but the influence of Cuniberti was evident".
