= List of battleships of World War I =

This is a list of battleships and battlecruisers of the First World War. All displacements are at standard load, in metric tonnes, so as to avoid confusion over their relative displacements. [Note: Not all displacements have been adjusted to match this yet]. Ideally displacements will be as they were at either the end of the war, or when the ship was sunk.

The list includes armed vessels that served during the war and in the immediate aftermath, inclusive of localized ongoing combat operations, garrison surrenders, post-surrender occupation, colony re-occupation, troop and prisoner repatriation. Some uncompleted vessels are included, out of historic interest.

== List of battleships ==
List of battleships of World War I
Ship	Operator	Class	Type	Displacement (tonnes)	First commissioned	End of service	Fate
Africa	Royal Navy	King Edward VII	pre-dreadnought	16,140	6 November 1906		Paid off November 1918, sold for scrap 30 June 1920
Agamemnon	Royal Navy	Lord Nelson	pre-dreadnought	15,604	25 June 1908	20 March 1919	Sold for scrap 24 January 1927
Agincourt	Royal Navy		dreadnought	28,297	7 August 1914	7 April 1922	Sold for scrap 19 December 1922
Ajax	Royal Navy	King George V	super-dreadnought	25,830	31 October 1913		Paid off October 1926, broken up 14 December 1926
Aki	Imperial Japanese Navy	Satsuma	semi-dreadnought	20,400	11 March 1911	20 September 1923	Sunk as target ship 2 September 1924
Alabama	United States Navy	Illinois	pre-dreadnought	11,751	16 October 1900	7 May 1920	Sunk as target 27 September 1921, sold for scrap 19 March 1924
Albemarle	Royal Navy	Duncan	pre-dreadnought	13,966	12 November 1903		Paid off April 1919, sold for scrap 19 November 1919
Albion	Royal Navy	Canopus	pre-dreadnought	13,360	25 June 1901		Paid off August 1919, sold for scrap 11 December 1919
Ammiraglio di Saint Bon	Regia Marina	Ammiraglio di Saint Bon	pre-dreadnought	10,244	1 February 1901	18 June 1920	Stricken 18 June 1920 and scrapped
Andrea Doria	Regia Marina	Andrea Doria	dreadnought	23,324	13 March 1916	16 September 1956	Scrapped 1956
Andrei Pervozvanny	Imperial Russian Navy	Andrei Pervozvanny	pre-dreadnought	17,600	10 March 1911	18 August 1919	Scrapped 15 December 1923
Arizona	United States Navy	Pennsylvania	super-dreadnought	29,626	17 October 1916	7 December 1941	Sunk 7 December 1941; war memorial
Arkansas	United States Navy	Wyoming	dreadnought	26,417	17 September 1912	29 July 1946	Stricken 15 August 1946, sunk as nuclear bomb target 25 July 1946
Árpád	Austro-Hungarian Navy	Habsburg	pre-dreadnought	8,364	15 June 1903		Ceded to Great Britain 1919, scrapped 1921
Asahi	Imperial Japanese Navy		pre-dreadnought	15,400	28 April 1900	1 April 1923	Sunk by submarine 26 May 1942
Audacious	Royal Navy	King George V	super-dreadnought	25,830	15 October 1913	27 October 1914	Sunk by mine 27 October 1914
Babenberg	Austro-Hungarian Navy	Habsburg	pre-dreadnought	8,364	15 April 1904		Ceded to Great Britain 1919, scrapped 1921
Barbaros Hayreddin	Ottoman Navy	Brandenburg	pre-dreadnought	10,013	29 April 1894	8 August 1915	Sunk by submarine 8 August 1915
Baden	Imperial German Navy	Bayern	super-dreadnought	28,530	14 March 1917	21 June 1919	Seized by Great Britain 21 June 1919, sunk as target 16 August 1921
Bayern	Imperial German Navy	Bayern	super-dreadnought	28,530	15 July 1916	21 June 1919	Scuttled at Scapa Flow 21 June 1919, raised 1 September 1934, broken up 1935
Barham	Royal Navy	Queen Elizabeth	super-dreadnought	33,110	19 October 1915	25 November 1941	Sunk by submarine 25 November 1941
Bellerophon	Royal Navy	Bellerophon	dreadnought	18,894	27 February 1909	March 1921	Sold for scrap 8 November 1921
Benbow	Royal Navy	Iron Duke	super-dreadnought	25,400	7 October 1914		Paid off September 1930, broken up March 1931
Benedetto Brin	Regia Marina	Regina Margherita	pre-dreadnought	14,973	1 September 1905	27 September 1915	Destroyed by explosion 27 September 1915
Bouvet	French Navy		pre-dreadnought	12,200	27 July 1898	18 March 1915	Sunk 18 March 1915
Brandenburg	Imperial German Navy	Brandenburg	pre-dreadnought	10,013	19 November 1893	20 December 1915	Paid off 13 May 1919, scrapped 1920
Braunschweig	Imperial German Navy	Braunschweig	pre-dreadnought	13,208	15 October 1904	31 March 1931	Stricken 31 March 1931, scrapped
Bretagne	French Navy	Bretagne	super-dreadnought	23,936	10 February 1916	3 July 1940	Sunk 3 July 1940, scrapped 1952–1954
Britannia	Royal Navy	King Edward VII	pre-dreadnought	16,140	8 September 1906	9 November 1918	Sunk by submarine 9 November 1918
Bulwark	Royal Navy	London	pre-dreadnought	14,700	18 March 1902	26 November 1914	Sunk by magazine explosion 26 November 1914
Caesar	Royal Navy	Majestic	pre-dreadnought	16,320	13 January 1898	23 April 1920	Sold for scrap 8 November 1921
Canada	Royal Navy	Almirante Latorre	super-dreadnought	28,600	15 October 1915	1 October 1958	Resold to Chile as Almirante Latorre April 1920, sold for scrap February 1959
Canopus	Royal Navy	Canopus	pre-dreadnought	13,360	5 December 1899	22 April 1916	Sold for scrap 18 February 1920
Centurion	Royal Navy	King George V	super-dreadnought	25,830	22 May 1913	9 June 1944	Scuttled as a "Mulberry" breakwater 9 June 1944
Charlemagne	French Navy	Charlemagne	pre-dreadnought	11,275	12 September 1899	1 November 1917	Stricken 21 June 1920, sold for scrap 1923
Chesma	Imperial Russian Navy	Petropavlovsk	pre-dreadnought	11,700	16 June 1900	16 June 1921	Stricken 3 July 1924 and scrapped
Collingwood	Royal Navy	St Vincent	dreadnought	20,000	19 April 1910	31 March 1922	Sold for scrap 12 December 1922
Colossus	Royal Navy	Colossus	dreadnought	20,350	8 August 1911	23 July 1923	Broken up 5 September 1928
Commonwealth	Royal Navy	King Edward VII	pre-dreadnought	16,140	9 May 1905		Paid off February 1921, sold for scrap 18 November 1921
Conqueror	Royal Navy	Orion	super-dreadnought	22,274	23 November 1912		Paid off June 1922, broken up 30 January 1923
Condorcet	French Navy	Danton	semi-dreadnought	18,754	25 July 1911		Sunk 7 March 1944, refloated September 1945, scrapped 1946–1949
Connecticut	United States Navy	Connecticut	pre-dreadnought	16,000	29 September 1906	1 March 1923	Sold for scrap 1 November 1923
Conte di Cavour	Regia Marina	Conte di Cavour	dreadnought	23,458	1 April 1915	8 September 1943	Capsized 23 February 1945, scrapped 1946
Cornwallis	Royal Navy	Duncan	pre-dreadnought	13,966	9 February 1904	9 January 1917	Sunk by submarine 9 January 1917
Courbet	French Navy	Courbet	dreadnought	23,475	19 November 1913	1 January 1941	Scuttled as a "Gooseberry" breakwater 6 June 1944
Cristoforo Colombo	Regia Marina	Francesco Caracciolo	super-dreadnought	31,400			Laid down 14 March 1915, dismantled on the slipway post-war
Dante Alighieri	Regia Marina		dreadnought	19,552	15 January 1913	1 July 1928	Scrapped 1928
Danton	French Navy	Danton	semi-dreadnought	18,754	1 June 1911	19 March 1917	Sunk by submarine 19 March 1917
Delaware	United States Navy	Delaware	dreadnought	20,707	4 April 1910	10 November 1923	Sold for scrap 5 February 1924
Démocratie	French Navy	Liberté	pre-dreadnought	14,900	9 January 1908	1 April 1920	Stricken 18 May 1921, sold for scrap
Deutschland	Imperial German Navy	Deutschland	pre-dreadnought	13,191	3 August 1906	10 September 1917	Stricken 25 January 1920 and sold for scrap
Diderot	French Navy	Danton	semi-dreadnought	18,754	25 July 1911	17 March 1937	Scrapped 31 August 1937
Dominion	Royal Navy	King Edward VII	pre-dreadnought	16,140	15 August 1905	2 May 1918	Broken up 28 October 1924
Dreadnought	Royal Navy		dreadnought	18,410	2 December 1906	7 August 1918	Broken up 2 January 1923
Duilio	Regia Marina	Andrea Doria	dreadnought	23,324	10 May 1915	15 September 1956	Scrapped 1957
Duncan	Royal Navy	Duncan	pre-dreadnought	13,966	8 October 1903		Paid off March 1919, sold for scrap 18 February 1920
Elsass	Imperial German Navy	Braunschweig	pre-dreadnought	13,208	29 November 1904	25 February 1930	Stricken 31 March 1931, scrapped 1936
Emanuele Filiberto	Regia Marina	Ammiraglio di Saint Bon	pre-dreadnought	9,800	6 September 1901	29 March 1920	Stricken 29 March 1920 and scrapped
Emperor of India	Royal Navy	Iron Duke	super-dreadnought	25,400	10 November 1914	6 June 1931	Sunk as target 1931, raised and broken up February 1932
Enrico Dandolo	Regia Marina	Duilio	ironclad battleship	10,679	11 April 1882	23 January 1920	Stricken 23 January 1920 and scrapped
Erin	Royal Navy	Reşadiye	dreadnought	23,150	19 August 1914	May 1922	Sold for scrap 19 December 1922
Erzherzog Ferdinand Max	Austro-Hungarian Navy	Erzherzog Karl	pre-dreadnought	10,640	21 December 1907		Ceded to Great Britain 1919, scrapped 1921
Erzherzog Franz Ferdinand	Austro-Hungarian Navy	Radetzky	pre-dreadnought	14,741	5 June 1910		Ceded to Italy September 1919, scrapped 1926
Erzherzog Friedrich	Austro-Hungarian Navy	Erzherzog Karl	pre-dreadnought	10,640	31 January 1907		Ceded to France 1920, scrapped 1921
Erzherzog Karl	Austro-Hungarian Navy	Erzherzog Karl	pre-dreadnought	10,640	17 June 1906		Ceded to France 1919, scrapped 1921
Evstafi	Imperial Russian Navy	Evstafi	pre-dreadnought	13,061	28 May 1911	March 1918	Renamed Revolyutsiya 6 July 1921, scrapped 1922–1923
Exmouth	Royal Navy	Duncan	pre-dreadnought	13,966	2 June 1903		Paid off August 1917, sold for scrap 15 January 1920
Fatih Sultan Mehmed	Ottoman Navy	Reşadiye	dreadnought	23,000			Laid down 11 June 1914, work halted July 1914, dismantled on the slipway August 1914
Flandre	French Navy	Normandie	super-dreadnought	25,250			Launched 20 October 1914, broken up October 1924
Florida	United States Navy	Florida	dreadnought	22,175	15 September 1911	16 February 1931	Stricken 6 April 1931, scrapped 1931–1932
Formidable	Royal Navy	Formidable	pre-dreadnought	14,700	10 October 1901	1 January 1915	Sunk by submarine 1 January 1915
France	French Navy	Courbet	dreadnought	23,475	1 July 1914	15 August 1935	Foundered 26 August 1922
Francesco Caracciolo	Regia Marina	Francesco Caracciolo	super-dreadnought	31,400			Laid down 16 October 1914, launched 12 May 1920, broken up 1926
Francesco Morosini	Regia Marina	Francesco Caracciolo	super-dreadnought	31,400			Laid down 27 June 1915, dismantled on the slipway post-war
Friedrich der Grosse	Imperial German Navy	Kaiser	dreadnought	24,724	15 October 1912	21 June 1919	Scuttled at Scapa Flow 21 June 1919, raised and broken up 1936
Fuji	Imperial Japanese Navy	Fuji	pre-dreadnought	12,430	8 August 1897	1 September 1922	Hulked 1922, scrapped 1948
Fusō	Imperial Japanese Navy	Fusō	super-dreadnought	29,797	8 November 1915	25 October 1944	Sunk 25 October 1944
Gangut	Imperial Russian Navy	Gangut	dreadnought	24,800	11 January 1915	17 February 1956	Renamed as Oktyabrskaya Revolutsiya 27 June 1925, scrapped 1956
Gascogne	French Navy	Normandie	super-dreadnought	25,250			Launched 20 September 1914, broken up 1923–1924
Gaulois	French Navy	Charlemagne	pre-dreadnought	11,275	15 January 1899	27 December 1916	Sunk by submarine 27 December 1916
Georgia	United States Navy	Virginia	pre-dreadnought	15,188	24 September 1906	15 July 1920	Sold for scrap 1 November 1923
Georgii Pobedonosets	Imperial Russian Navy	Ekaterina II	pre-dreadnought	11,209	1 September 1893	December 1920	Sold for scrap 1930–1936
Giulio Cesare	Regia Marina	Conte di Cavour	dreadnought	23,458	14 May 1914	29 October 1955	Ceded to Soviet Union as Novorossiysk 4 February 1949, sunk by explosion 29 October 1955
Glory	Royal Navy	Canopus	pre-dreadnought	13,360	1 November 1900	17 September 1921	Renamed as HMS Crescent April 1920, sold for scrap 19 December 1922
Goliath	Royal Navy	Canopus	pre-dreadnought	13,360	27 March 1900	13 May 1915	Sunk by torpedo 13 May 1915
Grosser Kurfürst	Imperial German Navy	König	dreadnought	25,796	30 July 1914	21 June 1919	Scuttled at Scapa Flow 21 June 1919, raised 29 April 1938, sold for scrap
Habsburg	Austro-Hungarian Navy	Habsburg	pre-dreadnought	8,364	31 December 1902		Ceded to Great Britain 1919, scrapped 1921
Hannibal	Royal Navy	Majestic	pre-dreadnought	16,320	1 April 1898	25 October 1919	Sold for scrap 28 January 1920
Hannover	Imperial German Navy	Deutschland	pre-dreadnought	13,191	1 October 1907	25 September 1931	Stricken 1936, scrapped 1944–1946
Helgoland	Imperial German Navy	Helgoland	dreadnought	22,808	23 August 1911	16 December 1918	Ceded to Great Britain 5 August 1920, scrapped 3 March 1921
Henri IV	French Navy		pre-dreadnought	8,948	1 September 1903		Stricken 1920, scrapped 15 January 1921
Hercules	Royal Navy	Colossus	dreadnought	20,350	31 July 1911	October 1921	Sold for scrap 8 November 1921
Hessen	Imperial German Navy	Braunschweig	pre-dreadnought	13,208	19 September 1905		Ceded to Soviet Union as Tsel 2 January 1946, scrapped 1960
Hibernia	Royal Navy	King Edward VII	pre-dreadnought	16,140	2 January 1907		Paid off October 1917, sold for scrap 8 November 1921
Hindustan	Royal Navy	King Edward VII	pre-dreadnought	16,140	22 August 1905	15 May 1918	Broken up 14 October 1923
Hizen	Imperial Japanese Navy		pre-dreadnought	12,985	23 March 1902	20 September 1923	Sunk as target 25 July 1924
Hyūga	Imperial Japanese Navy	Ise	super-dreadnought	30,460	30 April 1918	27 July 1945	Sunk 27 July 1945, scrapped 1946–1947
Iki	Imperial Japanese Navy	Imperator Aleksandr II	pre-dreadnought	9,748	1 July 1891	1 May 1915	Stricken 1 May 1915, sunk as target 3 October 1915
Illinois	United States Navy	Illinois	pre-dreadnought	11,751	16 September 1901	15 May 1920	Renamed as Prairie State 8 January 1941, stricken 31 December 1955, sold for scrap 18 May 1956
Illustrious	Royal Navy	Majestic	pre-dreadnought	16,320	15 April 1898	21 April 1919	Sold for scrap 18 June 1920
Imperator Aleksandr II	Imperial Russian Navy	Imperator Aleksandr II	pre-dreadnought	9,392	1 June 1891	21 April 1921	Renamed as Zarya Svobody 9 May 1917, sold for scrap 22 August 1922
Imperator Aleksandr III	Imperial Russian Navy	Imperatritsa Mariya	dreadnought	23,789	17 July 1917	29 December 1920	Renamed as Volia 29 April 1917, acquired successively by numerous factions, renamed as General Alekseyev 1 November 1919, scrapped 1936
Imperator Nikolai I	Imperial Russian Navy		dreadnought	27,830			Launched 18 October 1916, renamed as Demokratiya 29 April 1917, broken up 28 June 1927
Imperator Pavel I	Imperial Russian Navy	Andrei Pervozvanny	pre-dreadnought	17,600	10 March 1911	October 1918	Renamed as Respublika 29 April 1917, scrapped 22 November 1923
Imperatritsa Ekaterina Velikaya	Imperial Russian Navy	Imperatritsa Mariya	dreadnought	25,039	18 October 1915	19 June 1918	Renamed as Svobodnaya Rossiya 29 April 1917, scuttled 19 June 1918
Imperatritsa Mariya	Imperial Russian Navy	Imperatritsa Mariya	dreadnought	23,789	10 June 1915	20 October 1916	Sunk by magazine explosion 20 October 1916, refloated 18 May 1918, scrapped 1926
Ioann Zlatoust	Imperial Russian Navy	Evstafi	pre-dreadnought	13,061	1 April 1911	March 1918	Scrapped 1922–1923
Indiana	United States Navy	Indiana	pre-dreadnought	10,453	20 November 1895	31 January 1919	Sunk as target ship 1 November 1920, sold for scrap 19 March 1924
Iowa	United States Navy		pre-dreadnought	11,590	16 June 1897	31 March 1919	Sunk as target ship 23 March 1923
Implacable	Royal Navy	Formidable	pre-dreadnought	14,700	10 September 1901	4 February 1920	Sold for scrap 8 November 1921
Iron Duke	Royal Navy	Iron Duke	super-dreadnought	25,400	10 March 1914	17 October 1939	Paid off March 1946, broken up 1949
Irresistible	Royal Navy	Formidable	pre-dreadnought	14,700	4 February 1902	18 March 1915	Sunk by mine 18 March 1915
Ise	Imperial Japanese Navy	Ise	super-dreadnought	30,460	15 December 1917	28 July 1945	Sunk 28 July 1945, scrapped 1946–1947
Italia	Regia Marina	Italia	ironclad battleship	13,897	16 October 1885	16 November 1921	Stricken 16 November 1921 and scrapped
Iwami	Imperial Japanese Navy	Borodino	pre-dreadnought	13,700	1 October 1904	1 September 1922	Sunk as target 10 July 1924
Jauréguiberry	French Navy		pre-dreadnought	11,818	16 February 1897	30 March 1919	Stricken 20 June 1920, sold for scrap 23 June 1934
Jean Bart	French Navy	Courbet	dreadnought	23,475	19 November 1913	15 August 1935	Scrapped 14 December 1945
Justice	French Navy	Liberté	pre-dreadnought	14,900	15 April 1908	1 March 1921	Sold for scrap 30 December 1921
Jupiter	Royal Navy	Majestic	pre-dreadnought	16,320	8 June 1897		Paid off April 1919, sold for scrap 15 January 1920
Kaiser	Imperial German Navy	Kaiser	dreadnought	24,724	1 August 1912	21 June 1919	Scuttled at Scapa Flow 21 June 1919, raised 1929, broken up 1930
Kaiserin	Imperial German Navy	Kaiser	dreadnought	24,724	14 May 1913	21 June 1919	Scuttled at Scapa Flow 21 June 1919, raised and broken up 1936
Kaiser Barbarossa	Imperial German Navy	Kaiser Friedrich III	pre-dreadnought	11,097	10 June 1901	19 November 1915	Stricken 6 December 1919, scrapped 1919–1920
Kaiser Friedrich III	Imperial German Navy	Kaiser Friedrich III	pre-dreadnought	11,097	7 October 1898	20 November 1915	Stricken 6 December 1919, scrapped 1920
Kaiser Karl der Grosse	Imperial German Navy	Kaiser Friedrich III	pre-dreadnought	11,097	4 February 1902	19 November 1915	Stricken 6 December 1919, scrapped 1920
Kaiser Wilhelm der Grosse	Imperial German Navy	Kaiser Friedrich III	pre-dreadnought	11,097	5 May 1901	30 April 1915	Stricken 6 December 1919, scrapped 1920
Kaiser Wilhelm II	Imperial German Navy	Kaiser Friedrich III	pre-dreadnought	11,097	13 February 1900	10 September 1920	Stricken 17 March 1921, scrapped 1922
Kansas	United States Navy	Connecticut	pre-dreadnought	16,000	18 April 1907	16 December 1921	Sold for scrap 1924
Kashima	Imperial Japanese Navy	Katori	pre-dreadnought	19,683	23 May 1906	20 September 1923	Scrapped 24 November 1924
Katori	Imperial Japanese Navy	Katori	pre-dreadnought	16,210	20 May 1906	20 September 1923	Scrapped 29 January 1925
Kawachi	Imperial Japanese Navy	Kawachi	dreadnought	22,183	31 March 1912	12 July 1918	Sunk by magazine explosion 12 July 1918
Kearsarge	United States Navy	Kearsarge	pre-dreadnought	11,730	20 February 1900	10 May 1920	Converted to crane ship 17 July 1920, sold for scrap 9 August 1955
Kentucky	United States Navy	Kearsarge	pre-dreadnought	11,730	15 May 1900	29 May 1920	Sold for scrap 24 March 1923
Kilkis	Royal Hellenic Navy	Mississippi	pre-dreadnought	13,209	1 February 1908	23 April 1941	Sunk 23 April 1941, wreck was refloated and scrapped 1950s
King Edward VII	Royal Navy	King Edward VII	pre-dreadnought	16,140	7 February 1905	6 January 1916	Sunk by mine 6 January 1916
King George V	Royal Navy	King George V	super-dreadnought	25,830	16 November 1912	26 October 1926	Paid off 1 December 1926, broken up 27 January 1927
König	Imperial German Navy	König	dreadnought	25,796	10 August 1914	21 June 1919	Scuttled at Scapa Flow 21 June 1919
König Albert	Imperial German Navy	Kaiser	dreadnought	24,724	31 July 1913	21 June 1919	Scuttled at Scapa Flow 21 June 1919, raised 31 July 1935, broken up 1936
Kronprinz	Imperial German Navy	König	dreadnought	25,796	8 November 1914	21 June 1919	Renamed to Kronprinz Wilhelm June 1918, scuttled at Scapa Flow 21 June 1919
Languedoc	French Navy	Normandie	super-dreadnought	25,250			Launched 1 May 1915, broken up June 1929
Lemnos	Royal Hellenic Navy	Mississippi	pre-dreadnought	13,209	1 April 1908	23 April 1941	Sunk 23 April 1941, wreck was refloated and scrapped 1950s
Leonardo da Vinci	Regia Marina	Conte di Cavour	dreadnought	23,458	17 May 1914	2 August 1916	Sunk by explosion 2 August 1916, refloated 17 September 1919, sold for scrapping 26 March 1923
London	Royal Navy	London	pre-dreadnought	14,700	7 June 1902	31 March 1920	Sold for scrap 4 June 1920
Lord Nelson	Royal Navy	Lord Nelson	pre-dreadnought	15,604	1 December 1908		Paid off August 1919, sold for scrap 4 June 1920
Lorraine	French Navy	Bretagne	super-dreadnought	23,936	10 March 1916	17 February 1953	Scrapped January 1954
Lothringen	Imperial German Navy	Braunschweig	pre-dreadnought	13,208	18 May 1906	2 March 1920	Stricken 31 March 1931, scrapped
Louisiana	United States Navy	Connecticut	pre-dreadnought	16,000	2 June 1906	20 October 1920	Sold for scrap 1 November 1923
Maine	United States Navy	Maine	pre-dreadnought	13,052	29 December 1902	15 May 1920	Sold for scrap 23 January 1922
Magnificent	Royal Navy	Majestic	pre-dreadnought	16,320	12 December 1895	4 February 1920	Sold for scrap 9 May 1921
Majestic	Royal Navy	Majestic	pre-dreadnought	16,320	12 December 1895	27 May 1915	Sunk by submarine 27 May 1915
Malaya	Royal Navy	Queen Elizabeth	super-dreadnought	33,110	1 February 1916	1 December 1944	Broken up 12 April 1948
Marcantonio Colonna	Regia Marina	Francesco Caracciolo	super-dreadnought	31,400			Laid down 3 March 1915, dismantled on the slipway post-war
Markgraf	Imperial German Navy	König	dreadnought	25,796	1 October 1914	21 June 1919	Scuttled at Scapa Flow 21 June 1919
Marlborough	Royal Navy	Iron Duke	super-dreadnought	25,400	2 June 1914	5 June 1931	Paid off May 1932, broken up 25 June 1932
Mars	Royal Navy	Majestic	pre-dreadnought	16,320	8 June 1897	7 July 1920	Sold for scrap 9 May 1921
Massachusetts	United States Navy	Indiana	pre-dreadnought	10,453	10 June 1896	31 March 1919	Scuttled 6 January 1921
Masséna	French Navy		pre-dreadnought	11,920	25 May 1898	9 November 1915	Scuttled 9 November 1915
Mecklenburg	Imperial German Navy	Wittelsbach	pre-dreadnought	11,774	25 June 1903	24 January 1916	Stricken 25 January 1920, sold for scrap 16 August 1921
Mesudiye	Ottoman Navy		pre-dreadnought	9,120	1 December 1875	13 December 1914	Sunk by submarine 13 December 1914
Michigan	United States Navy	South Carolina	dreadnought	16,257	4 January 1910	11 February 1922	Stricken 10 November 1923, scrapped 24 April 1924
Mikasa	Imperial Japanese Navy		pre-dreadnought	15,380	1 March 1902	23 September 1923	Preserved as museum ship 12 November 1926
Minnesota	United States Navy	Connecticut	pre-dreadnought	16,000	9 March 1907	1 December 1921	Sold for scrap 23 January 1924
Mirabeau	French Navy	Danton	semi-dreadnought	18,754	1 August 1911	22 August 1919	Scrapped 28 April 1922
Mississippi	United States Navy	New Mexico	super-dreadnought	32,514	18 December 1917	17 September 1956	Sold for scrap 28 November 1956
Missouri	United States Navy	Maine	pre-dreadnought	12,560	1 December 1903	8 September 1919	Sold for scrap 26 January 1922
Monarch	Royal Navy	Orion	super-dreadnought	22,274	27 April 1912	13 June 1923	Sunk as target 21 January 1925
Napoli	Regia Marina	Regina Elena	pre-dreadnought	12,658	1 September 1908	3 September 1926	Scrapped 1926
Nassau	Imperial German Navy	Nassau	dreadnought	18,873	1 October 1909	7 April 1920	Ceded to Japan 7 April 1920, sold for scrap June 1920
Nebraska	United States Navy	Virginia	pre-dreadnought	15,188	1 July 1907	2 July 1920	Sold for scrap 9 November 1923
Neptune	Royal Navy		dreadnought	20,000	11 January 1911	1 February 1919	Broken up 22 September 1922
Nevada	United States Navy	Nevada	super-dreadnought	27,941	11 March 1916	29 August 1946	Sunk as target 31 July 1948
New Hampshire	United States Navy	Connecticut	pre-dreadnought	16,000	19 March 1908	21 May 1921	Sold for scrap 1 November 1923
New Jersey	United States Navy	Virginia	pre-dreadnought	15,188	12 May 1906	6 August 1920	Sunk as target 5 September 1923
New Mexico	United States Navy	New Mexico	super-dreadnought	32,514	20 May 1918	19 July 1946	Scrapped 24 November 1947
New York	United States Navy	New York	super-dreadnought	27,000	15 May 1914	29 August 1946	Sunk as target 6 July 1948
North Dakota	United States Navy	Delaware	dreadnought	20,707	11 April 1910	22 November 1923	Sold for scrap 16 March 1931
Normandie	French Navy	Normandie	super-dreadnought	25,250			Launched 19 October 1914, broken up 1924–1925
Ocean	Royal Navy	Canopus	pre-dreadnought	13,360	20 February 1900	18 March 1915	Sunk by mine 18 March 1915
Ohio	United States Navy	Maine	pre-dreadnought	12,927	4 October 1904	31 May 1922	Sold for scrap 24 March 1923
Oklahoma	United States Navy	Nevada	super-dreadnought	27,941	2 May 1916	7 December 1941	Sunk 7 December 1941, decommissioned 1 September 1944, raised and sunk under tow 1947
Oldenburg	Imperial German Navy	Helgoland	dreadnought	22,808	1 May 1912	5 November 1919	Ceded to Japan 13 May 1920, scrapped 1921
Ostfriesland	Imperial German Navy	Helgoland	dreadnought	22,808	1 August 1911	20 September 1920	Ceded to United States and recommissioned 7 April 1920, sunk as target 21 July 1921
Oregon	United States Navy	Indiana	pre-dreadnought	10,453	15 July 1896	12 June 1919	Preserved as museum ship June 1925, requisitioned March 1943, sold for scrap 15 March 1956
Orion	Royal Navy	Orion	super-dreadnought	22,274	2 January 1912	12 April 1922	Sold for scrap 19 December 1922
Panteleimon	Imperial Russian Navy		pre-dreadnought	13,100	20 May 1905	19 April 1919	Renamed as Potemkin-Tavricheskiy 13 April 1917 and as Borets za svobodu 11 May 1917, scrapped 1923
Paris	French Navy	Courbet	dreadnought	23,475	1 August 1914	21 December 1955	Scrapped June 1956
Patrie	French Navy	République	pre-dreadnought	14,900	1 July 1907	20 June 1924	Sold for scrap 25 September 1937
Pennsylvania	United States Navy	Pennsylvania	super-dreadnought	29,626	12 June 1916	29 August 1946	Sunk as target 10 February 1948
Peresvet	Imperial Russian Navy	Peresvet	pre-dreadnought	14,030	6 August 1901	4 January 1917	Sunk by submarine 4 January 1917
Petropavlovsk	Imperial Russian Navy	Gangut	dreadnought	24,800	5 January 1915	4 September 1953	Renamed as Marat 31 March 1921, sunk 23 September 1941 and later rear part refloated, scrapped September 1953
Poltava	Imperial Russian Navy	Gangut	dreadnought	24,800	30 December 1914	1 December 1940	Renamed as Frunze 7 January 1926, scrapped 1949
Pommern	Imperial German Navy	Deutschland	pre-dreadnought	13,191	6 August 1907	1 June 1916	Sunk 1 June 1916
Posen	Imperial German Navy	Nassau	dreadnought	18,873	31 May 1910	16 December 1918	Ceded to Great Britain 13 May 1920, scrapped 1922
Preussen	Imperial German Navy	Braunschweig	pre-dreadnought	13,208	12 July 1905	5 April 1929	Stricken 5 April 1929, scrapped 1931
Prince George	Royal Navy	Majestic	pre-dreadnought	16,320	26 November 1896	21 February 1920	Sold for scrap 22 September 1921
Prince of Wales	Royal Navy	London	pre-dreadnought	14,380	18 May 1904	10 November 1919	Sold for scrap 12 April 1920
Prinz Eugen	Austro-Hungarian Navy	Tegetthoff	dreadnought	20,000	8 July 1914	10 November 1918	Ceded to France 25 August 1920, sunk as target 28 June 1922
Prinzregent Luitpold	Imperial German Navy	Kaiser	dreadnought	24,724	19 August 1913	21 June 1919	Scuttled at Scapa Flow 21 June 1919, raised 9 July 1931, broken up 1933
Provence	French Navy	Bretagne	super-dreadnought	23,936	1 March 1916	27 November 1942	Scuttled 27 November 1942, refloated April 1949 and scrapped
Queen	Royal Navy	London	pre-dreadnought	14,380	7 April 1904		Paid off March 1920, broken up 5 August 1921
Queen Elizabeth	Royal Navy	Queen Elizabeth	super-dreadnought	33,110	22 December 1914	15 May 1948	Sold for scrap July 1948
Radetzky	Austro-Hungarian Navy	Radetzky	pre-dreadnought	14,741	15 January 1911	7 November 1920	Surrendered to United States and recommissioned 22 November 1919, ceded to Italy 7 November 1920, scrapped 1920–1921
Ramillies	Royal Navy	Revenge	super-dreadnought	30,060	1 September 1917	31 August 1945	Paid off 31 August 1945, scrapped 1949
Redoubtable	Royal Navy	Royal Sovereign	pre-dreadnought	14,380	14 January 1896		Paid off February 1919, sold for scrap 6 November 1919
Re Umberto	Regia Marina	Re Umberto	ironclad battleship	13,892	16 February 1893	4 July 1920	Stricken 4 July 1920 and scrapped
Regina Elena	Regia Marina	Regina Elena	pre-dreadnought	12,658	11 September 1907	16 February 1923	Scrapped 1923
Regina Margherita	Regia Marina	Regina Margherita	pre-dreadnought	14,319	14 April 1904	11 December 1916	Sunk by mine 11 December 1916
République	French Navy	République	pre-dreadnought	14,605	12 January 1907	21 May 1921	Stricken 29 June 1921, scrapped November 1921
Resolution	Royal Navy	Revenge	super-dreadnought	30,060	7 December 1916	February 1948	Scrapped 1949
Revenge	Royal Navy	Revenge	super-dreadnought	30,060	1 February 1916	March 1948	Scrapped 1948
Rheinland	Imperial German Navy	Nassau	dreadnought	18,873	30 April 1910	4 October 1918	Ceded to the Allies, scrapped 1921
Rhode Island	United States Navy	Virginia	pre-dreadnought	15,188	19 February 1906	30 June 1920	Sold for scrap 1 November 1923
Roma	Regia Marina	Regina Elena	pre-dreadnought	12,658	17 December 1908	3 September 1926	Scrapped 1926
Rostislav	Imperial Russian Navy		pre-dreadnought	10,690	1 March 1900	November 1920	Scuttled November 1920, partially dismantled 1930
Royal Oak	Royal Navy	Revenge	super-dreadnought	30,060	1 May 1916	14 October 1939	Sunk 14 October 1939
Royal Sovereign	Royal Navy	Revenge	super-dreadnought	30,060	1 February 1916	18 May 1949	Scrapped 18 May 1949
Russell	Royal Navy	Duncan	pre-dreadnought	13,966	19 February 1903	27 April 1916	Sunk by mine 27 April 1916
Sachsen	Imperial German Navy	Bayern	super-dreadnought	28,800			Launched 21 November 1916, stricken 3 November 1919, broken up 1921–1923
Saint Louis	French Navy	Charlemagne	pre-dreadnought	11,275	1 September 1900	8 February 1919	Stricken 29 June 1931, sold for scrap 25 April 1933
Salamis	Royal Hellenic Navy		super-dreadnought	19,800			Launched 11 November 1914, work halted 31 December 1914, broken up 1932
Sardegna	Regia Marina	Re Umberto	ironclad battleship	13,860	16 February 1895	4 January 1923	Stricken 4 January 1923 and scrapped
Satsuma	Imperial Japanese Navy	Satsuma	semi-dreadnought	19,683	25 March 1910	20 September 1923	Sunk as target 7 September 1924
Schlesien	Imperial German Navy	Deutschland	pre-dreadnought	13,191	5 May 1908	3 May 1945	Mined 3 May 1945, scrapped 1949–1956
Schleswig-Holstein	Imperial German Navy	Deutschland	pre-dreadnought	13,191	6 July 1908	18 December 1944	Scuttled 21 March 1945, used as target 1948–1966
Schwaben	Imperial German Navy	Wittelsbach	pre-dreadnought	11,774	13 April 1904	8 March 1921	Stricken 8 March 1921 and sold for scrap
Settsu	Imperial Japanese Navy	Kawachi	dreadnought	22,183	1 July 1912	20 November 1945	Converted into target ship 1923, scrapped 1946–1947
Sevastopol	Imperial Russian Navy	Gangut	dreadnought	24,800	30 November 1914	17 February 1956	Renamed as Parizhskaya Kommuna 31 March 1921, scrapped 1956–1957
Shikishima	Imperial Japanese Navy	Shikishima	pre-dreadnought	15,090	26 January 1900	1 April 1923	Scrapped January 1948
Sicilia	Regia Marina	Re Umberto	ironclad battleship	13,268	4 May 1895	4 March 1923	Stricken 4 March and scrapped
Sinop	Imperial Russian Navy	Ekaterina II	pre-dreadnought	11,490	1 June 1889	25 April 1919	Scrapped 1922
Slava	Imperial Russian Navy	Borodino	pre-dreadnought	14,646	12 June 1905	17 October 1917	Scuttled 17 October 1917, scrapped 1935
South Carolina	United States Navy	South Carolina	dreadnought	16,257	1 March 1910	15 December 1921	Stricken 10 November 1923, scrapped 24 April 1924
St Vincent	Royal Navy	St Vincent	dreadnought	20,000	3 May 1910	March 1921	Sold for scrap 1 December 1921
Suffren	French Navy		pre-dreadnought	12,432	3 February 1904	26 November 1916	Sunk by submarine 26 November 1916
Superb	Royal Navy	Bellerophon	dreadnought	18,894	9 June 1909	26 March 1920	Broken up 7 April 1923
Suwo	Imperial Japanese Navy	Peresvet	pre-dreadnought	14,030	10 March 1903	April 1922	Capsized 13 July 1922, scrapped 1922–1923
Swiftsure	Royal Navy	Swiftsure	pre-dreadnought	12,370	21 June 1904	26 April 1917	Sold for scrap 18 June 1920
Szent István	Austro-Hungarian Navy	Tegetthoff	dreadnought	20,000	13 December 1915	10 June 1918	Sunk by torpedo 10 June 1918
Tegetthoff	Austro-Hungarian Navy	Tegetthoff	dreadnought	20,000	14 July 1913		Acquired by Italy 9 November 1918, scrapped 1924
Temeraire	Royal Navy	Bellerophon	dreadnought	18,894	15 May 1909	15 April 1921	Broken up February 1922
Texas	United States Navy	New York	super-dreadnought	27,000	12 March 1914	21 April 1948	Decommissioned 21 April 1948; museum ship
Thunderer	Royal Navy	Orion	super-dreadnought	22,274	15 June 1912	31 August 1926	Sold for scrap 6 November 1926
Thüringen	Imperial German Navy	Helgoland	dreadnought	22,808	1 July 1911	16 December 1918	Ceded to France 29 April 1920, scrapped 1923–1933
Triumph	Royal Navy	Swiftsure	pre-dreadnought	12,370	21 June 1904	25 May 1915	Sunk by submarine 25 May 1915
Tri Sviatitelia	Imperial Russian Navy		pre-dreadnought	13,528	1 August 1896	24 April 1919	Scrapped 1923
Tsesarevich	Imperial Russian Navy		pre-dreadnought	13,105	31 August 1903		Renamed as Grazhdanin 13 April 1917, paid off May 1918, scrapped 1924
Turgut Reis	Ottoman Navy	Brandenburg	pre-dreadnought	10,013	14 October 1894		Scrapped 1950–1957
Utah	United States Navy	Florida	dreadnought	22,175	31 August 1911	7 December 1941	Sunk 7 December 1941, decommissioned 5 September 1944
Valiant	Royal Navy	Queen Elizabeth	super-dreadnought	33,110	19 February 1916	19 March 1948	Sold for scrap 19 March 1948
Vanguard	Royal Navy	St Vincent	dreadnought	20,000	1 March 1910	9 July 1917	Sunk by magazine explosion 9 July 1917
Vasilefs Konstantinos	Royal Hellenic Navy	Bretagne	super-dreadnought	23,936			Laid down 12 June 1914, work halted August 1914, broken up 1925
Venerable	Royal Navy	London	pre-dreadnought	14,700	12 November 1902	4 February 1920	Sold for scrap 4 June 1920
Vengeance	Royal Navy	Canopus	pre-dreadnought	13,360	8 April 1902	9 July 1920	Sold for scrap 1 December 1921
Vergniaud	French Navy	Danton	semi-dreadnought	18,754	18 December 1911	27 October 1921	Sold for scrap 27 November 1928
Vérité	French Navy	Liberté	pre-dreadnought	14,900	11 September 1908	1 August 1919	Stricken 18 May 1921, sold for scrap
Vermont	United States Navy	Connecticut	pre-dreadnought	16,000	4 March 1907	30 June 1920	Sold for scrap 30 November 1923
Victorious	Royal Navy	Majestic	pre-dreadnought	16,320	4 November 1896	28 March 1920	Sold for scrap 9 April 1923
Virginia	United States Navy	Virginia	pre-dreadnought	15,188	7 May 1906	13 August 1920	Sunk as target 5 September 1923
Viribus Unitis	Austro-Hungarian Navy	Tegetthoff	dreadnought	20,000	5 December 1912	1 November 1918	Handed over to the State of Slovenes, Croats and Serbs as Jugoslavija 31 October 1918, sunk 1 November 1918
Vittorio Emanuele	Regia Marina	Regina Elena	pre-dreadnought	12,658	1 August 1908	1 April 1923	Scrapped 1923
Voltaire	French Navy	Danton	semi-dreadnought	18,754	5 August 1911	17 March 1937	Sold for scrap December 1949
Warspite	Royal Navy	Queen Elizabeth	super-dreadnought	33,110	8 March 1915	1 February 1945	Stricken 19 April 1947, scrapped 1950–1955
Westfalen	Imperial German Navy	Nassau	dreadnought	18,873	16 November 1909	11 August 1918	Ceded to the Allies 5 August 1920, scrapped 1924
Wettin	Imperial German Navy	Wittelsbach	pre-dreadnought	11,774	1 October 1902	11 March 1920	Sold for scrap 21 November 1921
Wisconsin	United States Navy	Illinois	pre-dreadnought	11,751	4 February 1901	15 May 1920	Sold for scrap 26 January 1922
Wittelsbach	Imperial German Navy	Wittelsbach	pre-dreadnought	11,774	15 October 1902	8 March 1921	Sold for scrap 7 July 1921
Wörth	Imperial German Navy	Brandenburg	pre-dreadnought	10,013	31 October 1893	10 March 1916	Paid off 13 May 1919, scrapped 1920
Württemberg	Imperial German Navy	Bayern	super-dreadnought	28,800			Launched 20 June 1917, stricken 3 November 1919, broken up 1921
Wyoming	United States Navy	Wyoming	dreadnought	26,417	25 September 1912	1 August 1947	Stricken 16 December 1947, scrapped 5 December 1947
Yamashiro	Imperial Japanese Navy	Fusō	super-dreadnought	29,797	31 March 1917	25 October 1944	Sunk 25 October 1944
Zähringen	Imperial German Navy	Wittelsbach	pre-dreadnought	11,774	25 October 1902	18 December 1944	Scuttled 26 March 1945, scrapped 1949–1950
Zealandia	Royal Navy	King Edward VII	pre-dreadnought	16,140	11 July 1905	20 September 1917	Sold for scrap 8 November 1921
Zrínyi	Austro-Hungarian Navy	Radetzky	pre-dreadnought	14,741	22 November 1911	7 November 1920	Surrendered to United States and recommissioned 22 November 1919, ceded to Italy 7 November 1920, scrapped 1920–1921

== List of battlecruisers ==
List of battlecruisers of World War I
Ship	Operator	Class	Displacement (tonnes)	First commissioned	End of service	Fate
Australia	Royal Australian Navy	Indefatigable	18,800	21 June 1913	12 December 1921	Scuttled 12 April 1924
Borodino	Imperial Russian Navy	Borodino	33,000			Launched 31 July 1915, sold for scrap 21 August 1923
Courageous	Royal Navy	Courageous	19,490	28 October 1916	17 September 1939	Converted to aircraft carrier 1924–1928, sunk by submarine 17 September 1939
Derfflinger	Imperial German Navy	Derfflinger	26,600	1 September 1914	10 May 1917	Scuttled 21 June 1919, refloated 1939, scrapped 1946–1948
Ersatz Yorck	Imperial German Navy	Ersatz Yorck	33,500			Laid down July 1916, broken up 1918
Fürst Bismarck	Imperial German Navy	Mackensen	31,000			Laid down 3 November 1915, broken up 1922
Furious	Royal Navy	Courageous	19,826	26 June 1917	15 September 1944	Converted to aircraft carrier 1921–1925, paid off April 1945, broken up 1948–1954
Glorious	Royal Navy	Courageous	19,490	14 October 1916	8 June 1940	Converted to aircraft carrier 1924–1930, sunk 8 June 1940
Graf Spee	Imperial German Navy	Mackensen	31,000			Launched 15 September 1917, stricken 17 November 1919, sold for scrap 28 October 1921
Haruna	Imperial Japanese Navy	Kongō	27,384	19 April 1915	28 July 1945	Sunk 28 July 1945, refloated and scrapped 1946
Hiei	Imperial Japanese Navy	Kongō	27,384	4 August 1914	13 November 1942	Sunk 13 November 1942
Hindenburg	Imperial German Navy	Derfflinger	26,947	10 May 1917	21 June 1919	Scuttled 21 June 1919, refloated 23 July 1930, scrapped 1930–1932
Ibuki	Imperial Japanese Navy	Ibuki	14,871	1 November 1909	20 September 1923	Sold for scrap 20 September 1923
Ikoma	Imperial Japanese Navy	Tsukuba	13,970	24 March 1908	20 September 1923	Stricken 20 September 1923 and scrapped
Indefatigable	Royal Navy	Indefatigable	18,800	24 February 1911	31 May 1916	Sunk 31 May 1916
Indomitable	Royal Navy	Invincible	17,530	25 June 1908	31 March 1920	Sold for scrap 1 December 1921
Inflexible	Royal Navy	Invincible	17,530	20 October 1908	31 March 1920	Sold for scrap 1 December 1921
Invincible	Royal Navy	Invincible	17,530	20 March 1909	31 May 1916	Sunk 31 May 1916
Izmail	Imperial Russian Navy	Borodino	33,000			Launched 22 June 1915, broken up 1931
Kinburn	Imperial Russian Navy	Borodino	33,000			Launched 30 October 1915, sold for scrap 21 August 1923
Kirishima	Imperial Japanese Navy	Kongō	27,384	19 April 1915	15 November 1942	Sunk 15 November 1942
Kongō	Imperial Japanese Navy	Kongō	27,384	16 August 1913	21 November 1944	Sunk by submarine 21 November 1944
Kurama	Imperial Japanese Navy	Ibuki	14,871	28 February 1911	20 September 1923	Sold for scrap 20 September 1923
Lion	Royal Navy	Lion	26,690	4 June 1912	30 May 1922	Sold for scrap 31 January 1924
Lützow	Imperial German Navy	Derfflinger	26,600	8 August 1915	1 June 1916	Scuttled 1 June 1916
Mackensen	Imperial German Navy	Mackensen	31,000			Launched 21 April 1917, stricken 17 November 1919, broken up 1922
Moltke	Imperial German Navy	Moltke	22,979	30 August 1911	21 June 1919	Scuttled 21 June 1919, refloated 1927, scrapped 1929
Navarin	Imperial Russian Navy	Borodino	33,000			Launched 9 November 1916, sold for scrap 21 August 1923
New Zealand	Royal Navy	Indefatigable	18,800	19 November 1912	19 December 1922	Sold for scrap 22 January 1923
Princess Royal	Royal Navy	Lion	26,690	14 November 1912	19 December 1922	Sold for scrap 22 January 1923
Prinz Eitel Friedrich	Imperial German Navy	Mackensen	31,000			Laid down 1 May 1915, launched 13 March 1920, broken up 1921
Queen Mary	Royal Navy		27,200	4 September 1913	31 May 1916	Sunk 31 May 1916
Renown	Royal Navy	Renown	31,242	20 September 1916	1 June 1948	Scrapped 1948
Repulse	Royal Navy	Renown	31,242	18 August 1916	10 December 1941	Sunk during the Naval Battle of Malaya, 10 December 1941
Seydlitz	Imperial German Navy		24,988	22 May 1913	21 June 1919	Scuttled 21 June 1919, refloated 2 November 1928, scrapped 1930
Tiger	Royal Navy		29,000	3 October 1914	15 May 1931	Sold for scrap February 1932
Tsukuba	Imperial Japanese Navy	Tsukuba	13,970	14 January 1907	14 January 1917	Sunk by magazine explosion 14 January 1917
Von der Tann	Imperial German Navy		19,370	1 September 1910	21 June 1919	Scuttled 21 June 1919, refloated 7 December 1930, scrapped 1931
Yavuz Sultan Selim	Ottoman Navy	Moltke	22,979	2 July 1912	20 December 1950	Scrapped, 7 June 1973

== See also ==
- List of battleships
- List of battleships of World War II
