= Japanese battleship Tosa =

Battleship of the Imperial Japanese Navy

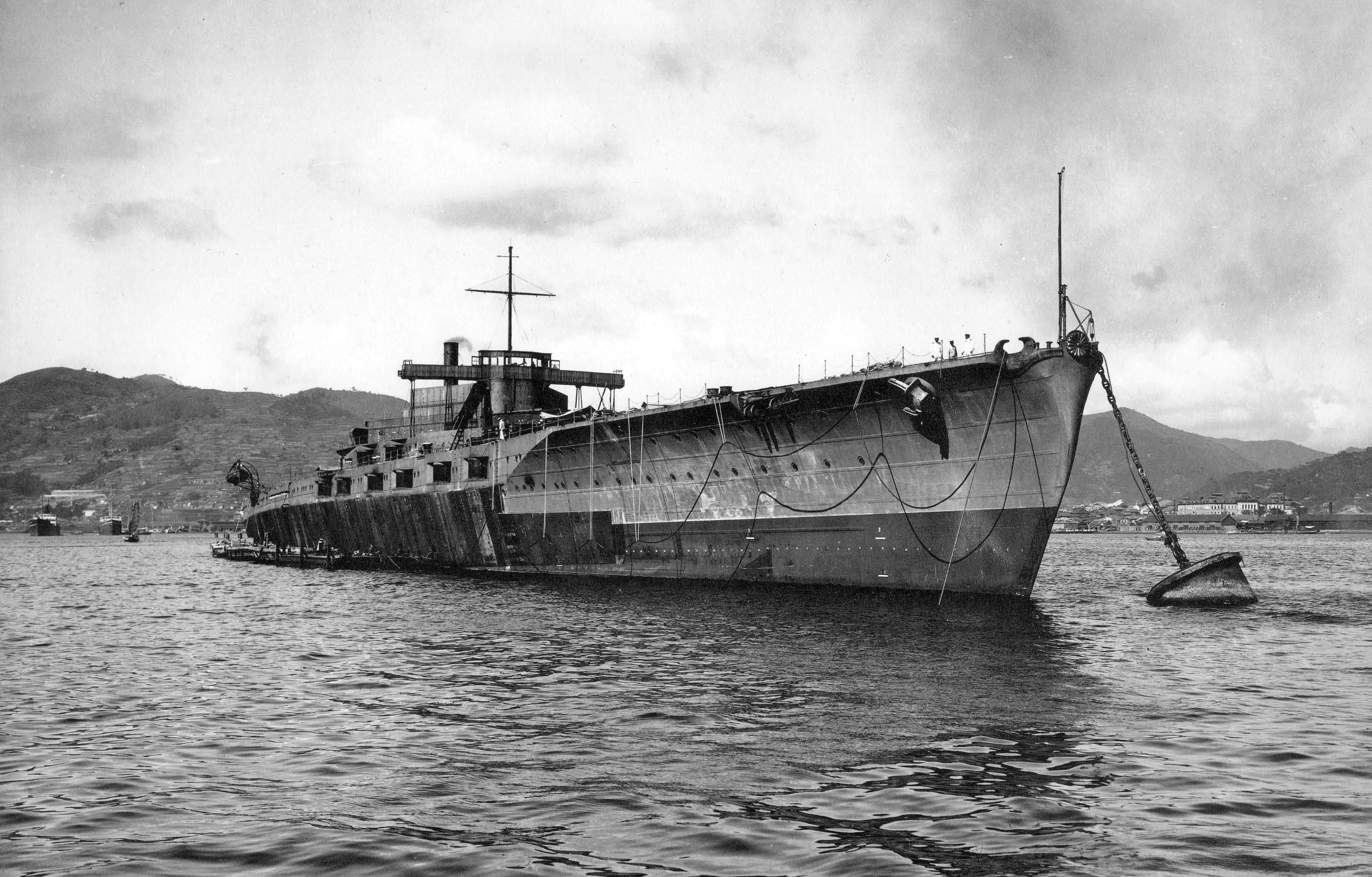
- Tosa at Nagasaki on 31 July 1922; the ship is only complete up to the main deck, hence the lack of any superstructure aside from the small bridge

History

Empire of Japan
- Name: Tosa
- Namesake: Tosa Province
- Ordered: 1918 Fiscal Year
- Builder: Mitsubishi (Nagasaki Shipyard & Machinery Works), Nagasaki
- Laid down: 2 February 1920
- Launched: 18 December 1921
- Fate: Construction cancelled, 5 February 1922; Scuttled, 9 February 1925

General characteristics
- Class & type: Tosa-class battleship
- Displacement: 39,900 long tons (40,540 t) (standard); 44,200 long tons (44,909 t) (full load)
- Length: 234.1 m (768 ft 1 in)
- Beam: 30.5 m (100 ft 1 in)
- Draught: 9.4 m (30 ft 10 in)
- Installed power: 12 × water-tube boilers; 91,000 shp (67,859 kW)
- Propulsion: 4 shafts; 4 × steam turbines
- Speed: 26.5 knots (49.1 km/h; 30.5 mph)
- Range: 5,000 nmi (9,300 km; 5,800 mi) at 16 knots (30 km/h; 18 mph)
- Complement: 1,333
- Armament: 5 × twin 41 cm (16.1 in) guns; 20 × single 14 cm (5.5 in) guns; 4 × single 76 mm (3 in) AA guns; 8 × 61 cm (24 in) torpedo tubes
- Armour: Deck: 102 mm (4 in); Bulkheads: 230–280 mm (9–11 in); Belt line: 254–279 mm (10–11 in); Bridge: 254–356 mm (10–14 in); Barbettes: 229–305 mm (9–12 in); Conning tower: 356 mm (14 in)

Tosa (Japanese: 土佐; named after the ancient Tosa Province) was a planned battleship of the Imperial Japanese Navy. Designed by Yuzuru Hiraga, Tosa was to be the first of two Tosa-class ships. Displacing 39,900 long tons (40,540 t) and armed with ten 410 mm (16.1 in) guns, these warships would have brought Japan closer to its goal of an "Eight-four" fleet (eight battleships and four battlecruisers). The ship was laid down in 1920, but all work was halted after the signing of the Washington Naval Treaty in 1922. As the treaty required the vessel to be destroyed, it was used for weapons testing before being scuttled in February 1925.

== Design and construction ==
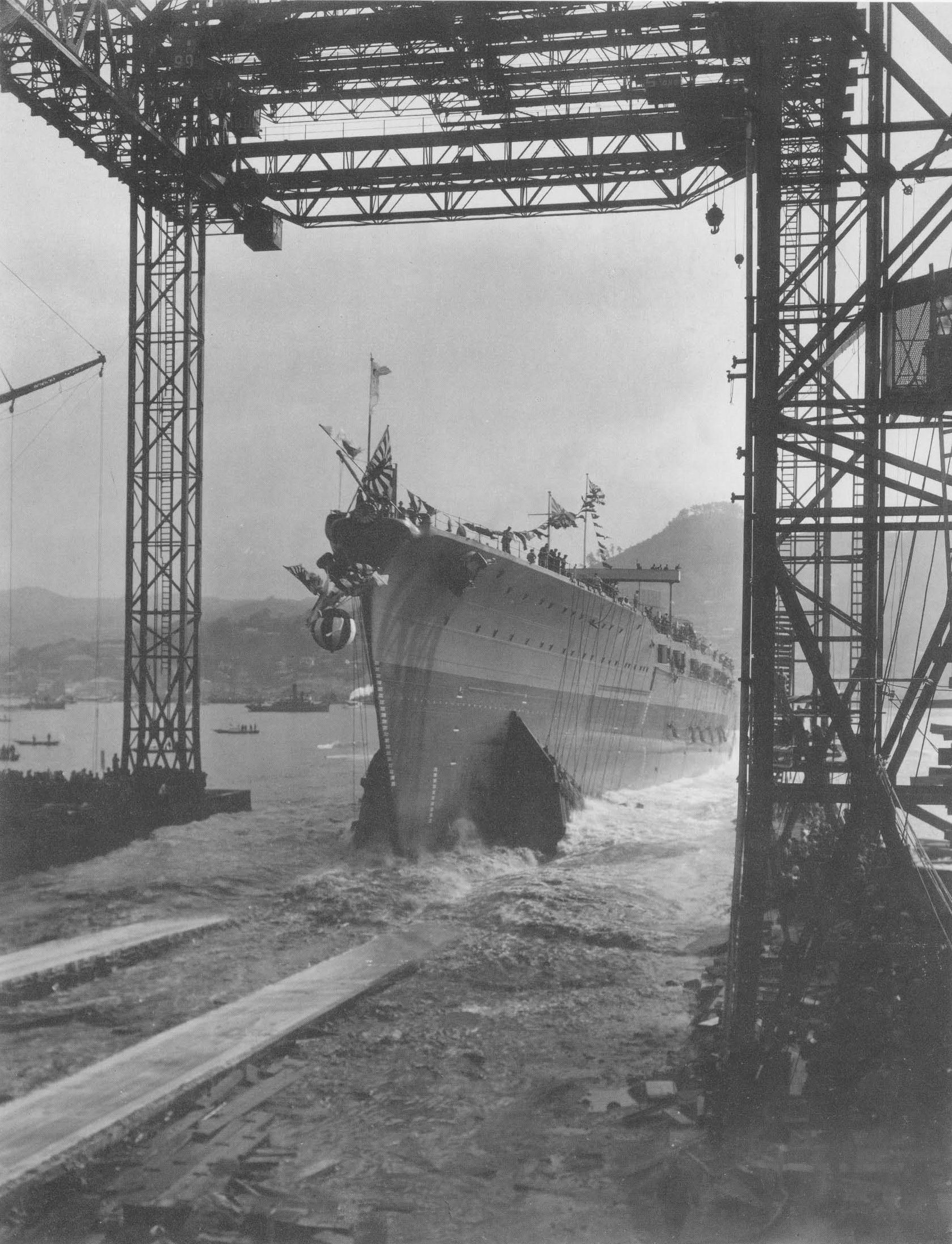
Tosa's launch, 18 December 1921

Designed by Yuzuru Hiraga, Tosa was intended to be part of a Japanese "Eight-four fleet", comprising eight battleships and four battlecruisers, the successor to the proposed "Eight-eight fleet". Tosa and its sister ship Kaga were intended to be the second set of high-speed battleships (after the Nagato class) under the plan, and were approved for construction in the Diet's 14 July 1917 warship-building authorization. Engineering blueprints for the two ships were completed by Japanese naval engineers in 1919. Based on Japanese studies of the British experience at the Battle of Jutland, the ships were to include new features over previous designs, including higher steaming speed despite increased tonnage, flush decks, and inclined armor. (Note: The 1917 authorization provided for the construction of, in addition to Tosa and Kaga, the battleship Mutsu, battlecruisers Amagi and Akagi, nine cruisers, 27 destroyers, 18 submarines and three auxiliaries. All construction on the ships authorized by the 1917 mandate were to be completed by 1 April 1924.)

Tosa was laid down on 16 February 1920 by Mitsubishi in Nagasaki (at the Nagasaki Shipyard & Machinery Works). It utilized the same slipway where, two decades later, the Yamato-class battleship Musashi would be built. Tosa was originally scheduled to be launched in October 1921, but multiple strikes delayed it until November. Ultimately, the battleship was not launched until 18 December 1921, two months behind schedule. Fitting-out commenced soon after with a projected completion date of July 1922. Work on Tosa was halted on 5 February 1922, one day before Japan signed the Washington Naval Treaty. Under the terms of the treaty, construction of Tosa and Kaga was formally canceled on 5 May 1922. (Note: Kaga was saved from the breakers by the September 1923 Great Kantō earthquake. Two Amagi-class battlecruisers, Amagi and Akagi, were in the process of being converted to aircraft carriers at the time, but the earthquake damaged Amagi beyond repair. Kaga's hull was quickly reordered as an aircraft carrier to compensate for the loss.)

== Career ==
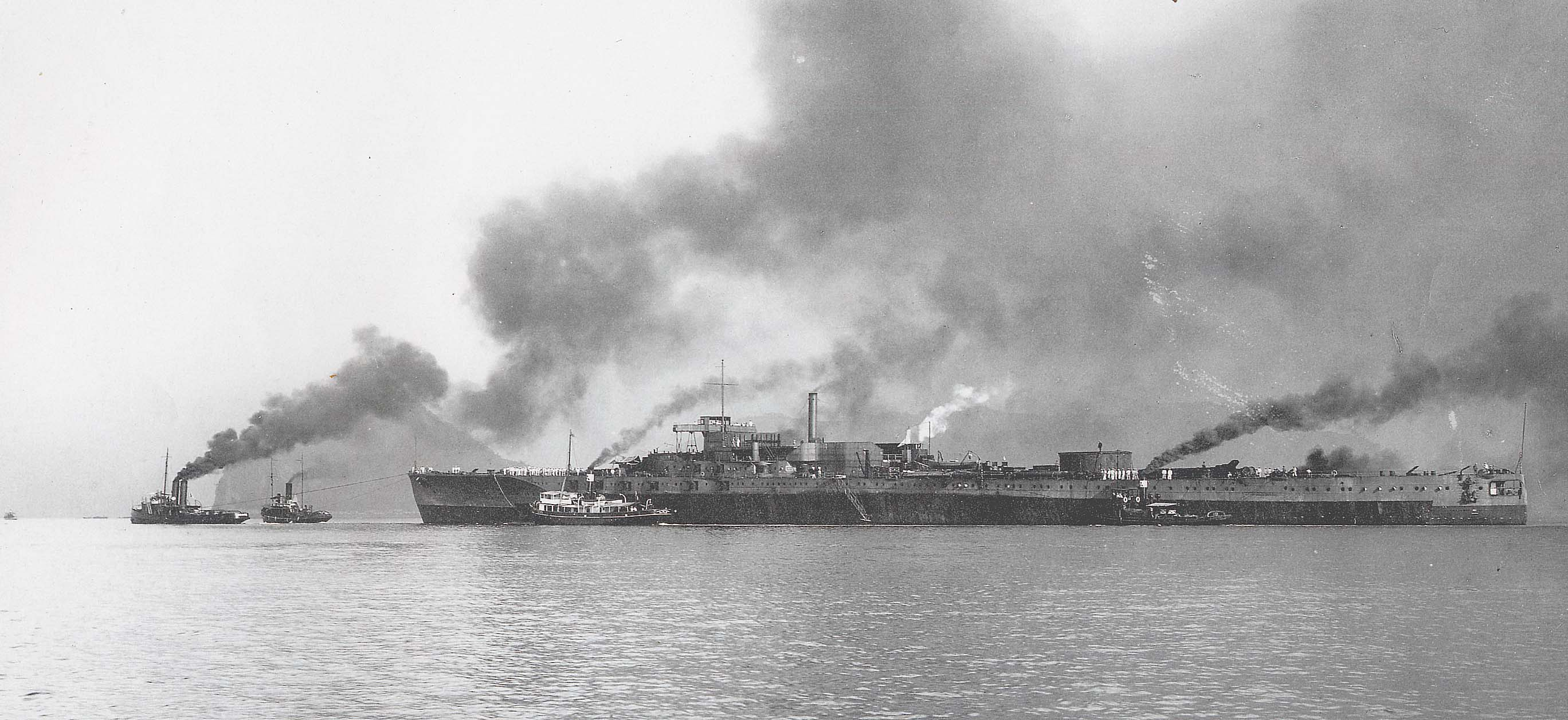
Tosa being towed from Nagasaki on 1 August 1922

In August 1922, Tosa was moved to Kure, still incomplete. Fifty thousand people turned out to watch as the battleship was towed out of the harbor by five tugboats. The barbettes for the 410 mm (16.1 inch) guns were in place, but no turrets or weapons had been mounted, so the holes in the main deck were covered with a mesh-like material. The ship's hull was finished, and a superstructure deck, bridge deck and conning tower had been fitted, along with a light signal mast directly aft of the second barbette. The conning tower had to be outfitted as a bridge, as there was no other suitable location; compared with those of similar ships, it was much smaller, as it contained only two levels and bridge wings. An exhaust pipe resembling an extremely small funnel was fitted so heat could be supplied within the ship. Its guns were turned over to the Imperial Japanese Army for use as coastal artillery; one of its main gun turrets was installed near Busan, Korea, in 1930 and another on Tsushima Island in 1933. The rest of its guns were placed in reserve and ultimately scrapped in 1943.

Tosa remained in Kure until mid-1924. Stricken on 1 April 1924, the ship—with its hull virtually finished—was designated for use in testing the effectiveness of shells and torpedoes against its armor arrangements. As a result, in June 1924 the navy's gunnery school took possession of the hull and prepared it for testing.

=== Test target ===
During 6–13 June, Tosa was subjected to five explosions. The first involved a 100 kg (220 lb) Mk.I mine placed on the starboard side of the ship, 3.7 m (12 ft) below the waterline at frame 57. The resultant explosion ruptured about 22 m^{2} (240 sq ft) of hull, while dishing in another 750 sq ft (70 m^{2}) of plating. Flooding took 23 compartments within the ship, 17 quickly and five slowly; a total of 995 long tons (1,011 t) of water entered the ship, increasing the ship's list to starboard by about 1° 54'.

The second and fifth test charges (8 and 13 June) were both placed near the fore main battery magazines. Involving larger charges than the first—about 200 kg (440 lb) (a 6th year type torpedo) and 150 kg (330 lb) (a 9th year type mine)—they were both placed at frame 87: the second to port and 4.04 m (13.3 ft) below the waterline, the fifth to starboard and 6.34 m (20.8 ft) below. Both breached the side protection system—allowing 1,008 and 726 long tons (1,024 and 738 t) of water, respectively, to enter the ship—showing that the usual three-compartment, all-void system used in most Japanese battleships was an insufficient defense against modern torpedoes. The list incurred during test two was a 6° 16' change, resulting in a port list of 4° 36'; for test five these numbers were 4° 38' and a starboard list of 0° 48'.

Similar to two and five, tests three and four were conducted at the same frame (192) but on opposite sides. Frame 192 was in the middle of the ship, where the ship's protection system was designed to be the strongest. Test three (9 June) was a 300 kg (660 lb) 8th year type torpedo on the starboard side at a depth of 4.05 m (13.3 ft) under the ship's waterline; four (12 June) was a 350 kg (770 lb) torpedo to port, 4.9 m (16 ft) below the waterline. The tests ruptured 15 and 26 m^{2} (160 and 280 sq ft), dished in 160 and 110 m^{2} (1,700 and 1,200 sq ft) of plating, and allowed 1,203 and 1,160 long tons (1,222 and 1,180 t) of water to enter the ship. Test three allowed in the most water of all the tests and, as a result, the list was altered from a previous port-side 2° 51' to a starboard-side 5° 22'—a change of 8° 13'. Test four went from a starboard 1° 0' to a port 5° 20'.

Further tests included the explosion of several Type 8 torpedoes filled with 300–346 kg (660–760 lbs) of picric acid within Tosa's designed magazine for them, which was located forward of the first turret and had been considered a weak point in previous battleship designs. This caused "extreme structural damage above the waterline" to Tosa, and confirmed that any problem in that part of the ship could seriously harm it. Possible solutions included the installation of additional armor over the room or the use of walls on one side of the magazine that would be blown out and away from the ship in the event of any serious explosion inside. This would have the effect of focusing the explosion outside, minimizing structural damage to the ship itself. Another test involved the explosion of 370 kg (820 lb) of TNT 5 m (16 ft) away from the side of the ship.

Another test conducted around this time involved a 410-millimeter (16.1 in) gun firing a shell at Tosa. It fell about 25 metres (82 ft) short of the ship, but continued through the water and struck the ship near frame 228, 3.3 metres (11 ft) below the designed waterline. The result was disturbing to the Japanese, as the shell passed through 76 mm (3.0 in) of armor and exploded in the port engine room. The hole let 3,000 long tons (3,048 t) of water in, and Tosa's list increased from 4° 53' to 10° 06'.

Results of the tests on Tosa were subsequently used in the refitting and reconstruction of existing warships. Lessons learned were also incorporated into the designs of the Yamato-class battleships ten years later. In the latter, this meant that the side belt armor was continued below the waterline and beneath the torpedo bulge so the class would have a defense against underwater shells.

Excerpt from the U.S. Naval Technical Missions evaluation of the Tosa experiments after the war, illustrating the location of the tests.

== Sinking ==
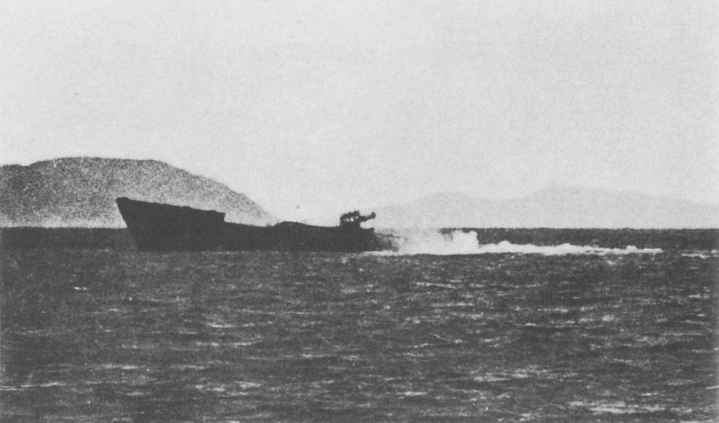
Tosa sinking stern-first, 9 February 1925

For the next few months, Tosa was given to the Hiroshima gunnery school for use as a target. On 14 January 1925, the Navy Ministry of Japan ordered Tosa to be scuttled within one month's time. To ensure this, the Commander in Chief of the Kure Naval District directed that preparations for scuttling the ship be completed by 1 February. It was planned that Tosa would be scuttled on or before 10 February after being towed by the former battleship Settsu to a location south of the Mizunokojima Lighthouse and 16.1 kilometers (9 nmi; 10 mi) west of Okinoshima Island (located southwest of the present-day Kōchi Prefecture, and different from the island of Okinoshima that is in the Sea of Japan). Later that month, the United States Office of Naval Intelligence reported that "work on the dismantling of Tosa has been going on at the Kure Naval Arsenal and everything possible has been removed. The intention is to fill her hull with sand and gravel, tow her out to deep water near the entrance to Kure, open her sea cocks, and send her to the bottom."

Tosa was brought from Kure on 3 February to Saiki Bay in the Bungo Channel. It was then towed from the bay on the 6th with the intention of bringing the battleship to the designated sinking spot, but were thwarted by a strong storm and returned. A second attempt was made at 10:00 on the 8th. Two 360 mm (14.2 in) shells were placed inside Tosa's double bottom, and two containers with 30 kg (66 lb) of Shimose powder in each were put into the engine room on the port side. They would be detonated using electrical fuses, though time fuses were also fitted for use if the sea was calm. The explosives were triggered on the 8th, but they failed, so a contingent was sent aboard Tosa on the 9th; they opened six Kingston valves in the engine room at about 01:25. Soon after, Tosa slowly began to sink by the stern and to starboard. By 03:50, the rate increased, and the ship slipped beneath the waves by 07:00. Tosa was the tenth and final Japanese capital ship sunk or scrapped to comply with the Washington naval treaty's stipulations. (Note: The other nine were the semi-dreadnoughts Aki and Satsuma; the pre-dreadnoughts Hizen, Kashima, and Katori; the armored cruisers Ikoma, Ibuki, and Kurama; and the incomplete battlecruiser Amagi.)

== See also ==
- Hashima Island, also known as Gunkanjima ('Battleship Island'), received its nickname from an apparent resemblance to Tosa

== Bibliography ==
- Breyer, Siegfried (1973). Battleships and Battle Cruisers, 1905–1970. Translated by Kurti, Alfred. Doubleday. OCLC 702840.
- Breyer, Siegfried (1980). Battleships of the World: 1905–1970. Translated by Thomas, Keith. Conway Maritime Press. OCLC 6355392.
- Evans, David C. & Peattie, Mark R. (1997). Kaigun: Strategy, Tactics, and Technology in the Imperial Japanese Navy, 1887–1941. Naval Institute Press. ISBN 0-87021-192-7.
- Friedman, Norman (1985). "Japan". In Gray, Randal (ed.). Conway's All the World's Fighting Ships 1906–1921. Naval Institute Press. pp. 221–251. ISBN 0-87021-907-3.
- "Appendix A; The Tosa Experiments" in Garzke, William H.; Dulin, Robert O. (1976). Battleships: United States Battleships in World War II. Naval Institute Press. ISBN 0-87021-099-8. OCLC 2414211.
- Gibbs, Jay (2010). "Question 28/43: Japanese Ex-Naval Coast Defense Guns". Warship International. XLVII (3): 217–218. ISSN 0043-0374.
- Gibbs, Jay; Tamura, Toshio (1982). "Question 51/80". Warship International. XIX (2): 190, 194–195. ISSN 0043-0374.
- Hall, R.A. (January 1922). "Professional Notes". Proceedings. 48. United States Naval Institute: 111.
- Jentschura, Hansgeorg; Jung, Dieter & Mickel, Peter (1977). Warships of the Imperial Japanese Navy, 1869–1945. United States Naval Institute. ISBN 978-0-87021-893-4.
- Lacroix, Eric & Wells II, Linton (1997). Japanese Cruisers of the Pacific War. Naval Institute Press. ISBN 0-87021-311-3.
- Lengerer, Hans (March 2008). Ahlberg, Lars (ed.). "Battleships of the Kaga Class and the so-called Tosa Experiments [part III]". Contributions to the History of Imperial Japanese Warships (4). (subscription required) (contact the editor at lars.ahlberghalmstad.mail.postnet.se for subscription information)
- "Japan: January 1925". Monthly Information Bulletin. 8 (3). Office of Naval Intelligence: 41. March 1925.
- Watts, Anthony J.; Gordon, Brian G. (1971). The Imperial Japanese Navy. Doubleday. ISBN 0-385-01268-3. OCLC 202878.
- Yoshimura, Akira (1991). Battleship Musashi: The Making and Sinking of the World's Biggest Battleship. Kondansha International. ISBN 4-7700-2400-2. OCLC 43303944.
