= Jirō Nangō =

Japanese admiral and judoka (1876–1951)

Jirō Nangō Junior Fourth Rank
- 南郷 次郎
- Born: December 21, 1876; Tokyo, Tokyo Prefecture, Japan
- Died: March 5, 1951 (aged 74)
- Education: Imperial Japanese Naval Academy
- Relatives: Jigorō Kanō
- Military career
- Allegiance: Empire of Japan
- Branch: Imperial Japanese Navy
- Service years: 1898–1924
- Rank: Kaigun-shōshō (Rear-admiral)
- Unit: 1st Torpedo-Boat Division
- Commands: List: Torpedo Boat No. 70 Hatsushimo Kashima Tokiwa Satsuma Asama Kasuga Katori
- Conflicts: Russo-Japanese War; Battle of Tsushima; World War I

Jirō Nangō (南郷 次郎, Nangō Jirō; December 21, 1876 – March 5, 1951) was a Japanese rear admiral and judoka. He served in the Russo-Japanese War and World War I and served as the 2nd director of the Kodokan Judo Institute from 1938 to 1946.

== Military career ==
Jirō Nangō

Jirō was born on December 21, 1876, as the eldest son of Shigemitsu Nangō who served as a politician and a civilian officer of the Imperial Japanese Navy. After graduating from the naval preparatory course at his Gakushuin, he would graduate from the 26th class of the Imperial Japanese Naval Academy in December 1898 and was commissioned as an ensign in January 1900. During the Russo-Japanese War, he was the captain of the 4th Torpedo-Boat Division and would later command the Torpedo Boat No. 70 of the 1st Torpedo-Boat Division. In December 1905, he was appointed as a Marine Secretary before studying as a Class B student at the Naval War College and a senior science student at the Naval Torpedo School. In September 1907, he became the captain of the Hatsushimo, and after commanding the Kashima, In September 1908, he was promoted to lieutenant commander of the Imperial Japanese Navy and commanded the Tokiwa. After working as an instructor at the Naval Torpedo School, he graduated from the Naval War College within Class A of its 8th class in November 1910.

In December 1910, he became the chief torpedo officer of the Satsuma and after serving as a marine instructor, he participated within World War I as deputy chief of the Asama. In December 1913, he was promoted to Commander. From February 1916, he served as a military attaché to Prince Yorihito Higashifushimi, and in December 1917, he was promoted to captain. In February 1919, he was appointed captain of Kasuga and later took command of the Katori before becoming deputy of the Imperial Japanese Navy General Staff. In December 1922, he advanced to the rank of rear admiral and became the commander of the Sasebo Defense Force. In December 1923, he was placed on standby, and in February 1924, he was transferred to the reserve.

As the nephew of Jigorō Kanō, the founder of the Kodokan Judo Institute, he served as the second director after his retirement from the Imperial Japanese Navy.

== Court Ranks ==
- Senior Eight Rank (February 20, 1900)
- Junior Seventh Rank (December 17, 1901)
- Senior Seventh Rank (December 19, 1903)
- Junior Sixth Rank (December 11, 1908)
- Senior Sixth Rank (January 30, 1914)
- Junior Fifth Rank (January 30, 1918)
- Senior Fifth Rank (December 28, 1922)
- Junior Fourth Rank (March 24, 1924)

== Awards ==
- Order of the Sacred Treasure, 4th class (May 16, 1914)
- First Census Commemorative Medal (July 1, 1921)

=== Foreign Awards ===
- Belgium: Order of the Crown, Commander
- France: Legion of Honour, Officer
- Italy: Order of Saints Maurice and Lazarus, Commander
- United Kingdom: Royal Victorian Order, Commander
