= Satsuma-class battleship =

Class of Japanese semi-dreadnoughts

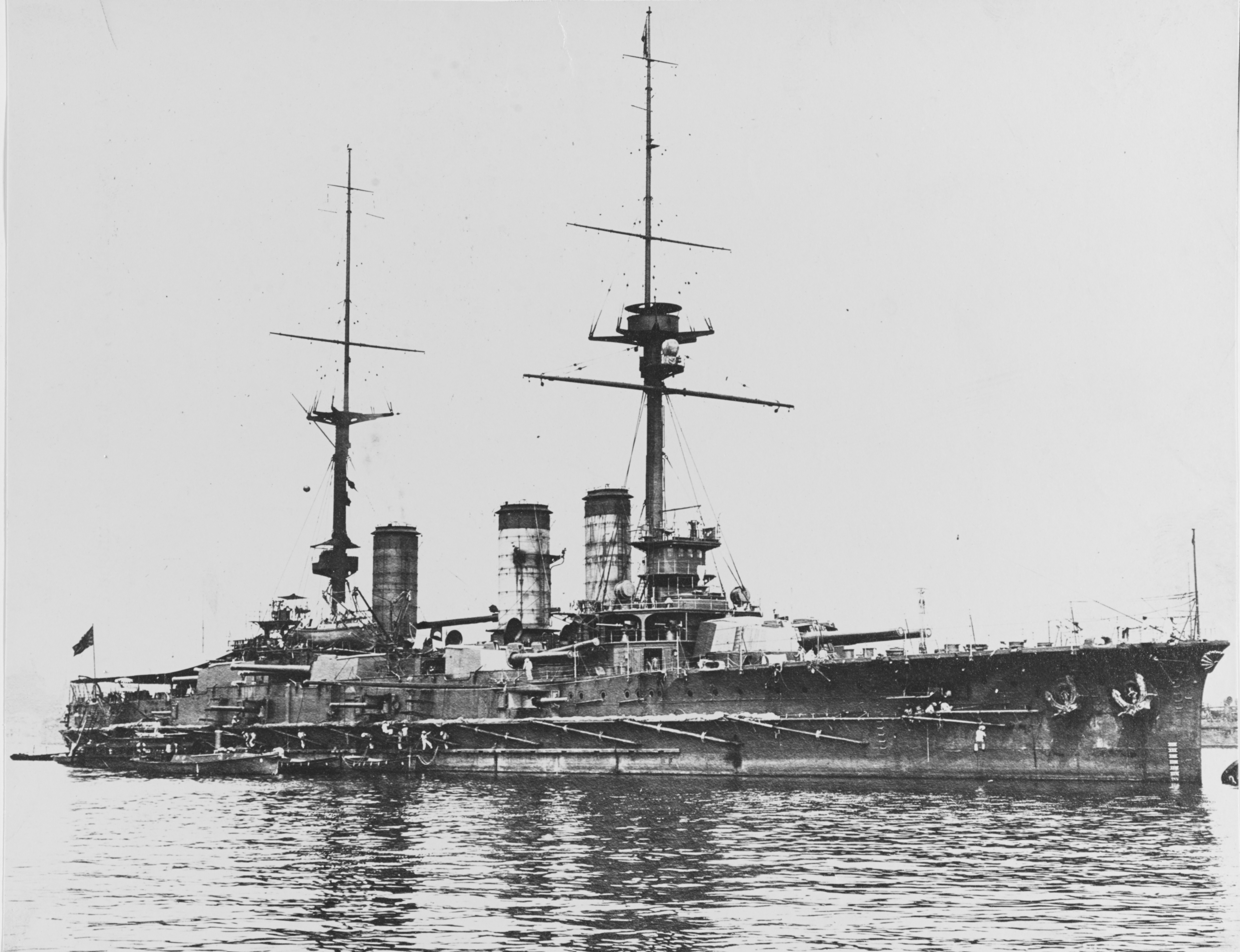
- The second Satsuma-class battleship Aki

Class overview
- Name: Satsuma class
- Builders: Kure Naval Arsenal; Yokosuka Naval Arsenal
- Operators: Imperial Japanese Navy
- Preceded by: Katori class
- Succeeded by: Kawachi class
- Subclasses: Aki
- Built: 1905–1911
- In commission: 1909–1922
- Completed: 2

General characteristics
- Type: Semi-dreadnought battleship
- Displacement: 19,372–20,100 long tons (19,683–20,423 t)
- Length: 482–492 ft (146.9–150.0 m)
- Beam: 83.5–83.6 ft (25.5–25.5 m)
- Draft: 27.5 ft (8.4 m)
- Installed power: 20 Miyabara water-tube boilers (Satsuma); 17,300 ihp (12,900 kW); 15 Miyabara boilers (Aki); 24,000 shp (18,000 kW)
- Propulsion: 2 shafts; 2 triple-expansion steam engines (Satsuma); 2 shafts, 2 steam turbine sets (Aki)
- Speed: 18–20 knots (33–37 km/h; 21–23 mph)
- Range: 9,100 nmi (16,900 km; 10,500 mi) at 10 knots (19 km/h; 12 mph)
- Complement: 800–940
- Armament: 2 × twin 12 in (305 mm) guns; 6 × twin 10 in (254 mm) guns; 8 × single 6 in (152 mm) guns (Aki); 12 × single 4.7 in (120 mm) guns (Satsuma); 8 or 12 × single 12 pdr (3 in (76 mm)) guns; 5 × 18 in (457 mm) torpedo tubes
- Armor: Waterline belt: 4–9 in (102–229 mm); Deck: 2–3 in (51–76 mm); Gun turrets: 7–9.5 in (178–241 mm); Conning tower: 6 in (152 mm); Casemates: 6 in (152 mm)

The Satsuma class (薩摩型戦艦, Satsuma-gata senkan) was a pair of semi-dreadnought battleships built for the Imperial Japanese Navy (IJN) in the first decade of the 20th century. They were the first battleships to be built in Japan and marked a transitional stage between the pre-dreadnought and true dreadnought designs. They saw no combat during World War I, although Satsuma led a squadron that occupied several German colonies in the Pacific Ocean in 1914. Both ships were disarmed and expended as targets in 1922–1924 in accordance with the terms of the Washington Naval Treaty of 1922.

== Background ==
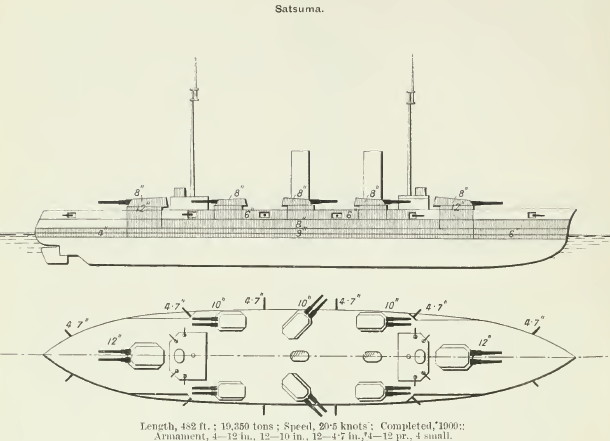
Line drawing of the battleship Satsuma from Brassey's Naval Annual 1912. Aki similar, but three funnels.

The Satsuma class was ordered in late 1904 under the 1904 War Naval Supplementary Program during the Russo-Japanese War. Unlike the previous Katori-class pre-dreadnought battleships, they were the first battleships ordered from Japanese shipyards, although the first ship in the class, Satsuma, used many imported components.

They were originally intended to mount a dozen 12-inch (305 mm) gun in four twin and four single-gun turrets, but the combination of a shortage of Japanese-built 12-inch guns and their additional expense caused the ships to be redesigned to carry four 12-inch and twelve 10-inch (254 mm) guns, all in twin-gun turrets. The intended armament of these ships, laid down before HMS Dreadnought, would have made them the first "all big-gun" battleships in the world had they been completed to their original design.

Probably reflecting extensive British technical assistance, the Satsuma-class ships greatly resembled an enlarged version of the British Lord Nelson class with the single-gun amidships intermediate turrets replaced by twin-gun turrets. With their heavy intermediate armament, the ships were considered to be semi-dreadnoughts, a transitional stage between pre-dreadnoughts with their light intermediate armament and dreadnoughts solely equipped with large guns.

== Description ==
The construction of Aki was delayed since she could not be laid down until the slipway occupied by the armored cruiser Tsukuba was freed by that ship's launching. The IJN took the opportunity provided by the delay to modify the ship to accommodate steam turbines and various other changes that generally increased her size. The changes were great enough that Aki is generally considered a half sister to Satsuma. The crew ranged from 800 to 940 officers and enlisted men.

Satsuma had an overall length of 482 feet (146.9 m), a beam of 83.5 feet (25.5 m), and a normal draft of 27.5 feet (8.4 m). She displaced 19,372 long tons (19,683 t) at normal load. Aki was 492 feet (150 m) long overall, had a beam of 83.6 feet (25.5 m), and the same draft as her half-sister. She displaced 20,100 long tons (20,400 t) at normal load.

=== Propulsion ===
Satsuma was powered by a pair of vertical triple-expansion steam engines, each driving one propeller shaft, using steam generated by 20 Miyabara water-tube boilers using a mixture of coal and fuel oil. The engines were rated at a total of 17,300 indicated horsepower (12,900 kW) and were designed to reach a top speed of 18.25 knots (33.80 km/h; 21.00 mph). During the ship's sea trials she reached 18.95 knots (35.10 km/h; 21.81 mph) from 18,507 ihp (13,801 kW). Satsuma carried a maximum of 2,860 long tons (2,910 t) of coal and 377 long tons (383 t) of oil which allowed her to steam for 9,100 nautical miles (16,900 km; 10,500 mi) at a speed of 10 knots (19 km/h; 12 mph). Unlike her half-sister, she only had two funnels.

Aki was intended use the same type of engines as her sister, but the IJN decided fit her with a pair of Curtiss steam turbine sets after she was launched in 1907. The turbines each powered one propeller shaft using steam from 15 Miyabara boilers. The turbines were rated at a total of 24,000 shaft horsepower (18,000 kW) for a design speed of 20 knots (37 km/h; 23 mph). The ship reached a top speed of 20.25 knots (37.50 km/h; 23.30 mph) during her sea trials from 27,740 shp (20,690 kW). She carried a maximum of 3,000 long tons (3,000 t) of coal and 172 long tons (175 t) of oil gave her the same range as her half sister.

=== Armament ===
The ships were completed with four 45-caliber 12-inch 41st Year Type guns in two gun turrets, one each fore and aft of the superstructure. They fired 850-pound (386 kg) armor-piercing (AP) shells at a muzzle velocity of 2,800 ft/s (850 m/s); this gave a maximum range of 24,000 yards (22,000 m). The intermediate armament was much more numerous than in the preceding Katori class, with six twin-gun turrets equipped with 45-caliber Type 41 10-inch guns, three turrets on each side of the superstructure. The guns had a muzzle velocity of 2,707 ft/s (825 m/s) when firing 500-pound (227 kg) shells.

The other major difference between the two ships was that Aki's secondary armament consisted of eight 45-caliber 6-inch (152 mm) 41st Year Type guns, mounted in casemates in the sides of the hull. The gun fired a 100-pound (45 kg) AP shell at a muzzle velocity of 2,706 ft/s (825 m/s). Satsuma, in contrast, was equipped with a dozen quick-firing (QF) 40-caliber 4.7-inch (120 mm) 41st Year Type guns, mounted in casemates in the sides of the hull. The gun fired a 45-pound (20 kg) shell at a muzzle velocity of 2,150 ft/s (660 m/s).

The ships were also equipped with four (Satsuma) or eight (Aki) 40-caliber QF 12-pounder (3-inch (76 mm)) 12-cwt guns (Note: "Cwt" is the abbreviation for hundredweight, 12 cwt referring to the weight of the gun.) and four 28-caliber QF 12-pounder guns. Both of these guns fired 12.5-pound (5.67 kg) shells with muzzle velocities of 2,300 ft/s (700 m/s) and 1,500 feet per second (450 m/s) respectively. In addition, the battleships were fitted with five submerged 18-inch (457 mm) torpedo tubes, two on each broadside and one in the stern.

=== Armor ===
The waterline main belt of the Satsuma-class vessels consisted of Krupp cemented armor that had a maximum thickness of 9 inches (229 mm) amidships and tapered to a thickness of 4 inches (102 mm) inches at the ends of the ship. A 6-inch (152 mm) strake of armor protected the casemates. The barbettes for the main guns were 7–9.5 inches (180–240 mm) thick. The armor of Satsuma's main gun turrets had a maximum thickness of 8 inches (203 mm) inches and those of Aki were an inch thicker. The deck armor was 2–3 inches (51–76 mm) thick and the conning tower was protected by six inches of armor.

== Ships ==
Construction data
| Ship | Builder | Laid down | Launched | Completed | Fate |
|---|---|---|---|---|---|
| Satsuma | Yokosuka Naval Arsenal | 15 May 1905 | 15 November 1906 | 25 March 1910 | Sunk as a target ship, 7 September 1924 |
| Aki | Kure Naval Arsenal | 15 March 1906 | 15 April 1907 | 11 March 1911 | Sunk as a target ship, 2 September 1924 |

== Service ==
The completion of the British battleship Dreadnought with her all big-gun-armament and steam turbines in 1906 meant that these ships were obsolete even before they were completed. The IJN recognized that fact when it drew up the first iteration of its Eight-Eight Fleet building plan for eight first-class battleships and eight battlecruisers in 1910 and did not include them.

Aki was refitting at Kure and Satsuma was assigned to the 1st Battleship Squadron when World War I began in August 1914. The latter served as Rear Admiral Tatsuo Matsumura's flagship in the Second South Seas Squadron as it seized the German possessions of the Caroline and the Palau Islands in October 1914. Satsuma rejoined the 1st Battleship Squadron in 1915, was refitted at Sasebo Naval Arsenal in 1916 and served with the 1st Squadron for the rest of the war. Aki was also assigned to the 1st Squadron upon the completion of her refit and remained with it until she was transferred to the 2nd Battleship Squadron in 1918.

In the years immediately following the end of the war, the United States, Britain, and Japan all launched huge naval construction programs. All three countries decided that a new naval arms race would be ill-advised, and so convened the Washington Naval Conference to discuss arms limitations, which produced the Washington Naval Treaty, signed in February 1922. Japan was well over the tonnage limits and all of her obsolete predreadnought and semi-dreadnought battleships had to be disposed of by the end of 1924. Both ships were disarmed at Yokosuka in 1922, stricken from the Navy List during 1923 and converted into target ships. Aki was sunk by the battlecruiser Kongō and the battleship Hyūga in Tokyo Bay on 2 September 1924; Satsuma was sunk by the battleships Nagato and Mutsu five days later in the same area.
