= Japanese battleship Aki =

Imperial Japanese Navy's Satsuma-class battleship

Coordinates: 35.025°N 139.856°E

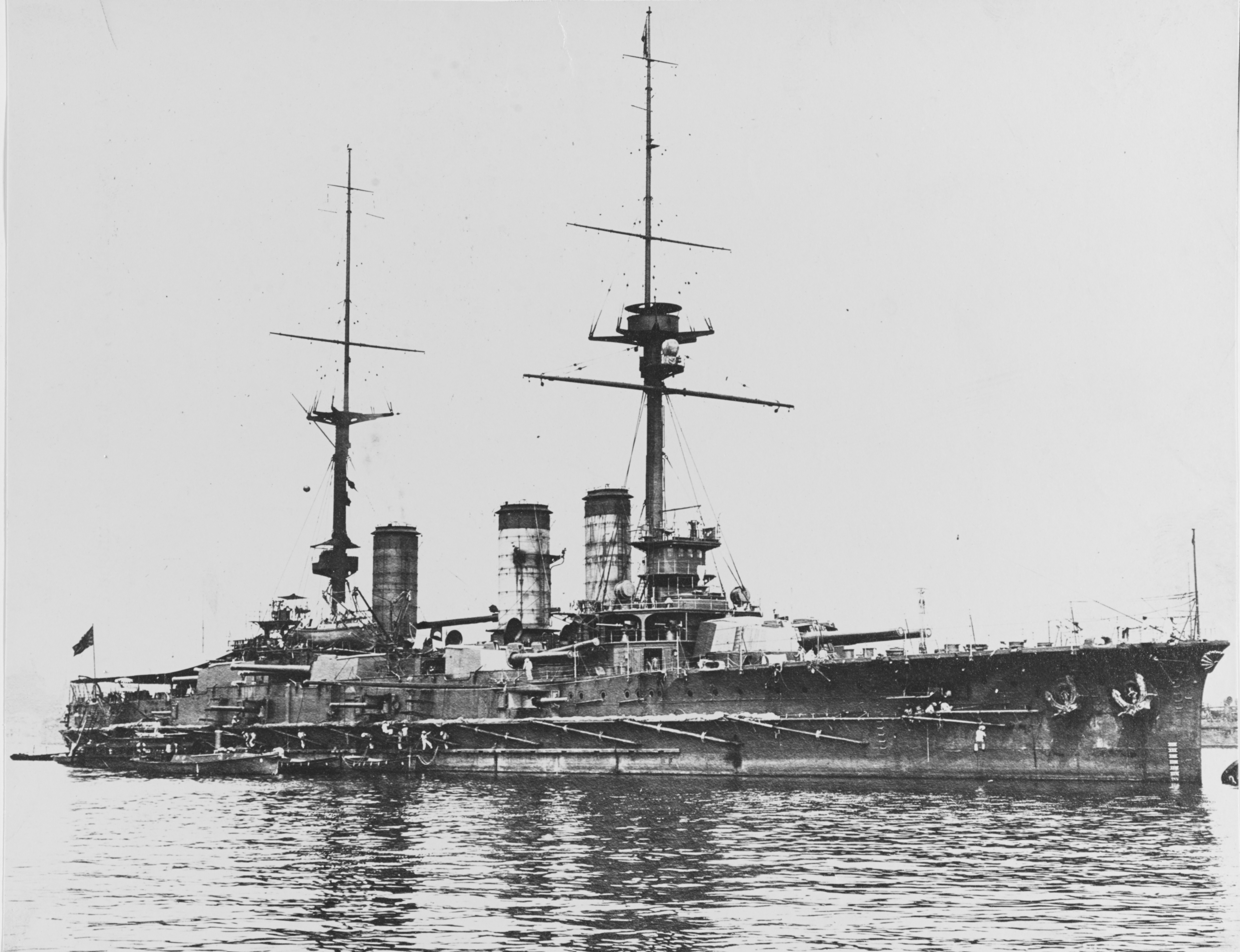
- Broadside view of Aki

History

Japan
- Name: Aki
- Namesake: Aki Province
- Ordered: 1904
- Builder: Kure Naval Arsenal, Japan
- Laid down: 15 March 1906
- Launched: 14 April 1907
- Commissioned: 11 March 1911
- Stricken: 1923
- Fate: Sunk as target, 2 September 1924

General characteristics
- Class & type: Satsuma-class semi-dreadnought battleship
- Displacement: 20,100–21,800 long tons (20,423–22,150 t)
- Length: 492 ft (150 m)
- Beam: 83 ft 7 in (25.5 m)
- Draft: 27 ft 6 in (8.4 m)
- Installed power: 15 Miyabara water-tube boilers; 24,000 shp (18,000 kW)
- Propulsion: 2 shafts, 2 steam turbine sets
- Speed: 20 knots (37 km/h; 23 mph)
- Range: 9,100 nmi (16,900 km; 10,500 mi) at 10 knots (19 km/h; 12 mph)
- Complement: 931
- Armament: 2 × twin 12 in (305 mm) guns; 6 × twin 10 in (254 mm) guns; 8 × single 6 in (152 mm) guns; 12 × single 12 pdr (3 in (76 mm)) guns; 5 × 18 in (457 mm) torpedo tubes
- Armor: Waterline belt: 4–9 in (102–229 mm); Deck: 2–3 in (51–76 mm); Gun turrets: 7–9.5 in (178–241 mm); Conning tower: 6 in (152 mm); Casemates: 6 in (152 mm)

Aki (安芸) was one of two Satsuma-class semi-dreadnought battleship built for the Imperial Japanese Navy (IJN) during the first decade of the 20th century. She was the second battleship built domestically in Japan and the first to use steam turbines for propulsion. The ship was named for Aki Province, now a part of Hiroshima Prefecture. The ship saw no combat during World War I. Aki was disarmed in 1922 and sunk as a target in 1924 in accordance with the terms of the Washington Naval Treaty of 1922.

== Background ==
The Satsuma class was ordered in late 1904 under the 1904 War Naval Supplementary Program during the Russo-Japanese War. Unlike the previous Katori-class pre-dreadnought battleships, they were the first battleships ordered from Japanese shipyards. They were originally designed with a dozen 12-inch (305 mm) guns, but had to be redesigned because of a shortage of guns in Japan and to reduce costs.

== Design and description ==
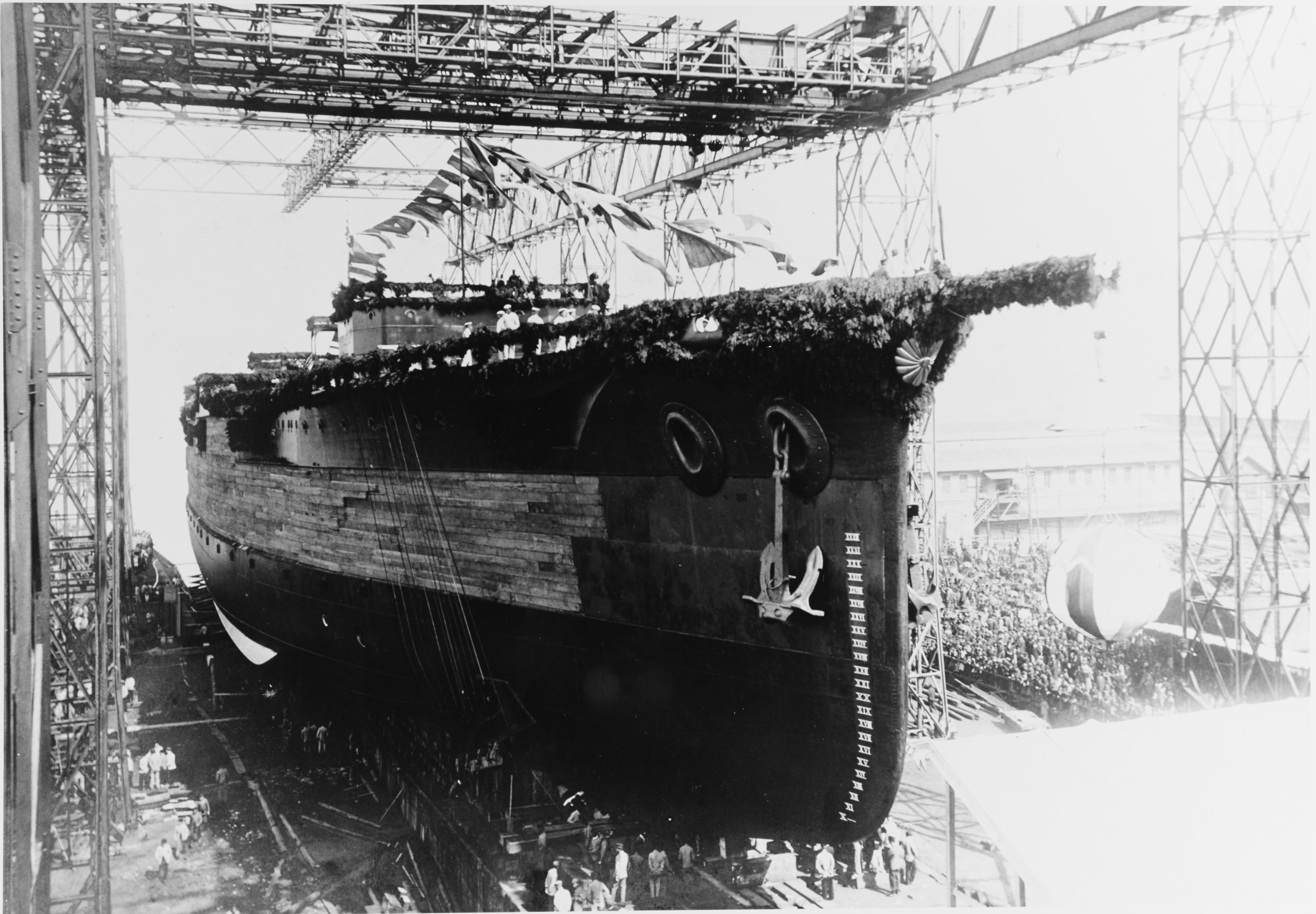
The launching of Aki at the Kure Naval Arsenal, April 1907

The ship had an overall length of 492 feet (150 m), a beam of 83 feet 7 inches (25.5 m), and a normal draft of 27 feet 6 inches (8.4 m). She displaced 20,100 long tons (20,400 t) at normal load. The crew consisted of 931 officers and enlisted men.

Aki was fitted with a pair of Curtiss steam turbine sets, each driving one shaft using steam from 15 Miyabara water-tube boilers. The turbines were rated at a total of 24,000 shaft horsepower (18,000 kW) for a design speed of 20 knots (37 km/h; 23 mph). The ship reached a top speed of 20.25 knots (37.5 km/h; 23.3 mph) during her sea trials from 27,740 shp (20,690 kW). She carried enough coal and oil to give her a range of 9,100 nautical miles (16,900 km; 10,500 mi) at a speed of 10 knots (19 km/h; 12 mph). Unlike her half-sister, she had three funnels.

The ship's main battery consisted of four 45-caliber 12-inch (305 mm) 41st Year Type guns in two twin-gun turrets, one each fore and aft of the superstructure. Her intermediate armament consisted of six twin-gun turrets equipped with 45-caliber Type 41 10-inch (254 mm) guns, three turrets on each side of the superstructure. Her heavy intermediate armament of guns larger than 9 inches (229 mm) is why the ship is considered to be a semi-dreadnought.

Aki's secondary armament consisted of eight 45-caliber 6-inch (152 mm) 41st Year Type guns, mounted in casemates in the sides of the hull. The ship was also equipped with eight quick-firing (QF) 40-caliber 12-pounder (3-inch (76 mm)) 12-cwt guns (Note: "Cwt" is the abbreviation for hundredweight, 12 cwt referring to the weight of the gun.) and four 28-caliber 12-pounder QF guns. In addition, the battleship was fitted with five submerged 18-inch (457 mm) torpedo tubes, two on each broadside and one in the stern.

The waterline main belt of the Satsuma-class vessels consisted of Krupp cemented armor that had a maximum thickness of nine inches amidships. It tapered to a thickness of four inches (102 mm) at the ends of the ship. A six-inch strake of armor protected the casemates. The barbettes for the main guns were seven–nine point five inches (180–240 mm) thick. The armor of Aki's main gun turrets had a maximum thickness of eight inches (203 mm). The deck armor was two–three inches (51–76 mm) thick and the conning tower was protected by six inches of armor.

== Construction and service ==
Aki was laid down at Kure Naval Arsenal on 15 March 1906. She was launched on 15 April 1907, but construction was suspended for about five months after the decision was made on 26 November to install steam turbines on Aki and the armored cruiser Ibuki. Aki's turbines were already behind schedule and the suspension allowed the less valuable ship to be completed first, and changes made to its turbines after testing were also incorporated into Aki's turbines. Aki was finally completed on 11 March 1911 and her first captain was Tatsuo Matsumura.

When World War I began in August 1914, Aki was refitting at Kure Naval Arsenal. She was assigned to the 1st Battleship Squadron upon the completion of her refit and remained with it until she was transferred to the 2nd Battleship Squadron in 1918, seeing no combat during the war. From December 1915 to December 1916, she was commanded by Captain Kiyokazu Abo. The ship was disarmed at Yokosuka in 1922 to comply with the provisions of the Washington Naval Treaty, stricken from the navy list during 1923 and converted into a target ship. Her guns were turned over to the Imperial Japanese Army for use as coastal artillery. The rest of her guns were placed in reserve and ultimately scrapped in 1943. Two of her 10-inch gun turrets were installed as coastal artillery batteries on Jōgashima island to protect Tokyo Bay. Aki was sunk by the battlecruiser Kongō and the battleship Hyūga on 2 September 1924 in Tokyo Bay.
