= Japanese battleship Satsuma =

Imperial Japanese Navy's Satsuma-class battleship

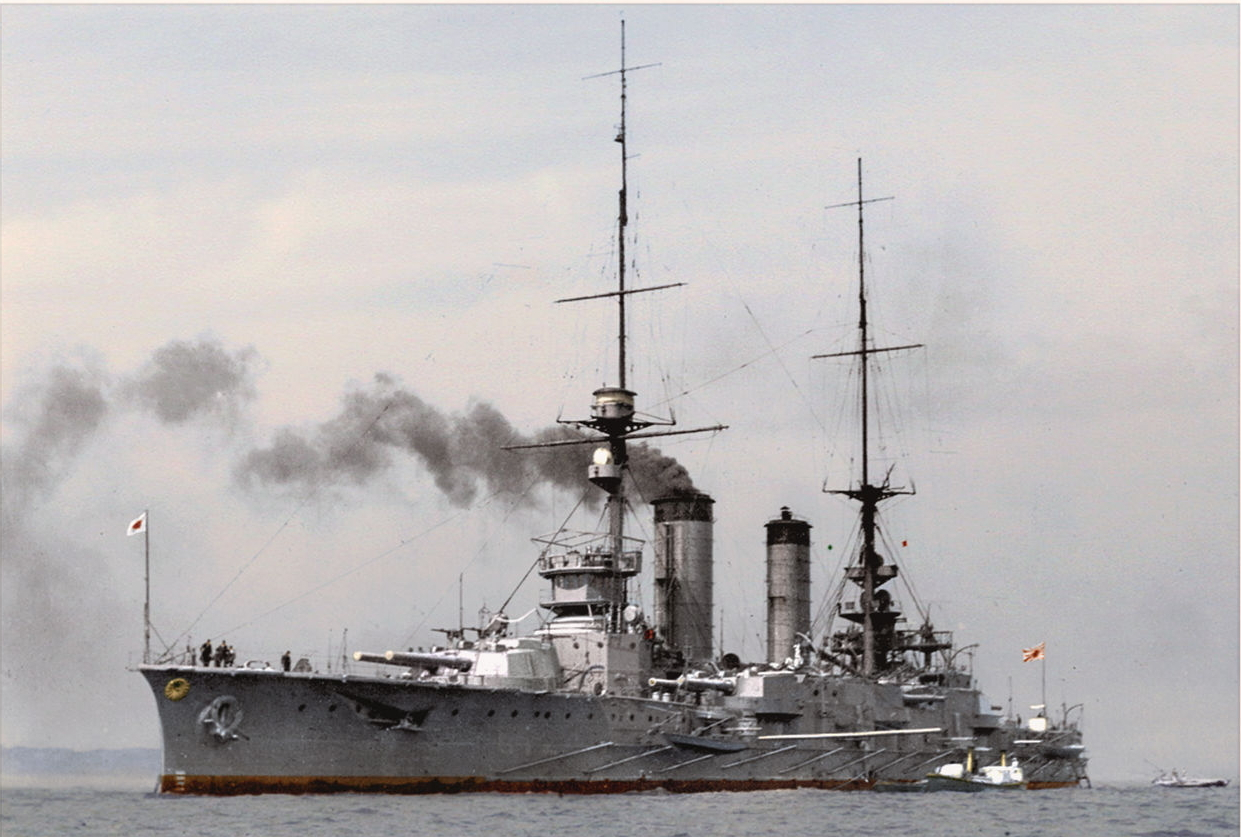
- Picture of Satsuma

History

Japan
- Name: Satsuma
- Namesake: Satsuma Province
- Ordered: 1904
- Builder: Yokosuka Naval Arsenal, Japan
- Laid down: 15 May 1905
- Launched: 15 November 1906
- Commissioned: 25 March 1910
- Decommissioned: 1922
- Stricken: 20 September 1923
- Fate: Sunk as target, 7 September 1924

General characteristics
- Class & type: Satsuma-class semi-dreadnought battleship
- Displacement: 19,372–19,700 long tons (19,683–20,016 t)
- Length: 482 ft (146.9 m)
- Beam: 83 ft 6 in (25.5 m)
- Draft: 27 ft 6 in (8.4 m)
- Installed power: 20 Miyabara water-tube boilers; 17,300 ihp (12,900 kW)
- Propulsion: 2 shafts; 2 triple-expansion steam engines
- Speed: 18.25 knots (33.8 km/h; 21.0 mph)
- Range: 9,100 nmi (16,900 km; 10,500 mi) at 10 knots (19 km/h; 12 mph)
- Complement: 800–940
- Armament: 2 × twin 12 in (305 mm) guns; 6 × twin 10 in (254 mm) guns; 12 × single 4.7 in (120 mm) guns; 8 × single 12 pdr (3 in (76 mm)) guns; 5 × 18 in (457 mm) torpedo tubes
- Armor: Waterline belt: 4–9 in (102–229 mm); Deck: 2–3 in (51–76 mm); Gun turrets: 7–9 in (178–229 mm); Conning tower: 6 in (152 mm); Casemates: 6 in (152 mm)

Satsuma (薩摩) was a semi-dreadnought battleship built for the Imperial Japanese Navy (IJN) in the first decade of the 20th century. Lead ship of her class, she was the first battleship built in Japan. She was named for Satsuma Province, now a part of Kagoshima prefecture. The ship saw no combat during World War I, although she led a squadron that occupied several German colonies in the Pacific Ocean in 1914. Satsuma was disarmed and sunk as a target in 1922–1924 in accordance with the terms of the Washington Naval Treaty of 1922.

== Background ==
The Satsuma class was ordered in late 1904 under the 1904 War Naval Supplementary Program during the Russo-Japanese War. Unlike the previous Katori-class pre-dreadnought battleships, they were the first battleships ordered from Japanese shipyards, although Satsuma used many imported components. They were originally designed with a dozen 12-inch (305 mm) guns, but had to be redesigned because of a shortage of guns in Japan and to reduce costs.

== Design and description ==
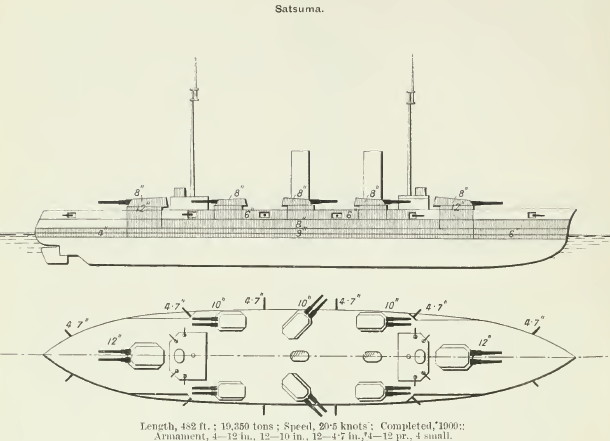
Line drawing of the battleship Satsuma from Brassey's Naval Annual 1912

The ship had an overall length of 482 feet (146.9 m), a beam of 83 feet 6 inches (25.5 m), and a normal draft of 27 feet 6 inches (8.4 m). She displaced 19,372 long tons (19,683 t) at normal load. The crew ranged from 800 to 940 officers and enlisted men.

Satsuma was powered by a pair of vertical triple-expansion steam engines, each driving one propeller, using steam generated by 20 Miyabara water-tube boilers using a mixture of coal and fuel oil. The engines were rated at a total of 17,300 indicated horsepower (12,900 kW) and designed to reach a top speed of 18.25 knots (33.8 km/h; 21.0 mph). During the ship's sea trials she reached 18.95 knots (35.1 km/h; 21.8 mph) from 18,507 ihp (13,801 kW). Satsuma carried enough coal and oil to give her a range of 9,100 nautical miles (16,900 km; 10,500 mi) at a speed of 10 knots (19 km/h; 12 mph).

The ship was completed with four 45-caliber 12-inch 41st Year Type guns in two gun turrets, one each fore and aft of the superstructure. They fired 850-pound (386 kg) armor-piercing (AP) shells to a maximum range of 24,000 yd (22,000 m). The intermediate armament consisted of six twin-gun turrets equipped with 45-caliber Type 41 10-inch (254 mm) guns, three turrets on each side of the superstructure. Her heavy intermediate armament is why the ship is considered a semi-dreadnought.

Satsuma was equipped with a dozen 40-caliber quick-firing (QF) 4.7-inch (120 mm) 41st Year Type guns, mounted in casemates in the sides of the hull. The ship was also equipped with four 40-caliber QF 12-pounder (3-inch (76 mm)) 12-cwt guns (Note: "Cwt" is the abbreviation for hundredweight, 12 cwt referring to the weight of the gun.) and four 28-caliber QF 12-pounder guns. In addition, she was fitted with five submerged 18-inch (457 mm) torpedo tubes, two on each broadside and one in the stern.

The waterline main belt of the Satsuma-class vessels consisted of Krupp cemented armor that had a maximum thickness of 9 inches (229 mm) amidships. It tapered to a thickness of 4 inches (102 mm) inches at the ends of the ship. A 6-inch (152 mm) strake of armor protected the casemates. The barbettes for the main guns were 7–9.5 inches (180–240 mm) thick. The armor of Satsuma's main gun turrets had a maximum thickness of nine inches. The deck armor was 2–3 inches (51–76 mm) thick and the conning tower was protected by six inches of armor.

== Construction and career ==
Satsuma, named for Satsuma Province, was laid down at Yokosuka Naval Arsenal on 15 May 1905. She was launched on 15 November 1906 with Emperor Meiji, the Navy Minister, and other high officials on hand for the ceremony, and completed on 25 March 1910. At the time of her launching, Satsuma had the largest displacement of any battleship in the world.

On 5 August 1911, the ship suffered an explosion in one of her 12-inch guns when it failed to fire during gunnery practice. After some time passed, the breech was opened and ignited the propellant; the resulting fire killed 16 crewmen and several officers.

She was lightly damaged by a typhoon on 22 September 1912. Satsuma was assigned to the 1st Battleship Squadron when World War I began in August 1914. She served as Rear Admiral Tatsuo Matsumura's flagship in the Second South Seas Squadron as it seized the German possessions of the Caroline and the Palau Islands in October 1914.

Satsuma rejoined the 1st Battleship Squadron in 1915, was refitted at Sasebo Naval Arsenal in 1916 and served with the 1st Squadron for the rest of the war. Sometime during the war, she was fitted with two 12-pounders on high-angle mounts to serve as anti-aircraft guns.

The ship was disarmed at Yokosuka Naval Arsenal in 1922 to comply with the provisions of the Washington Naval Treaty, stricken from the Navy List on 20 September 1923 and converted into a target ship. Satsuma was sunk by the battleships Mutsu and Nagato off the southern tip of the Bōsō Peninsula, near the mouth of Tokyo Bay on 7 September 1924.
