= Vickers 10-inch 45-calibre naval gun =

Vickers 10 inch /45 naval gun Type 41 10-inch (254 mm) /45-caliber naval gun BL 10 inch Mk VII
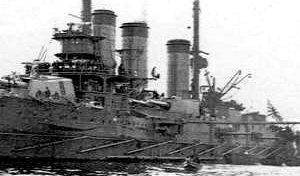
- Forward port gun turret on Japanese battleship Aki
- Place of origin: United Kingdom

Service history
- In service: 1904–37
- Used by: Imperial Japanese Navy; Royal Navy; Italian Navy
- Wars: World War I

Production history
- Designer: Vickers
- Manufacturer: Vickers

Specifications
- Mass: 22 tons
- Barrel length: 450-inch (11.430 m) bore (45 calibres)
- Shell: IJN service : 518 pounds (235 kg); RN service : 500 pounds (227 kg)
- Calibre: 10-inch (254 mm)
- Elevation: -5 / +30 degrees
- Traverse: +80 / -80 degrees
- Rate of fire: 1.5 rounds per minute
- Muzzle velocity: 2,657 ft/s (810 m/s)
- Effective firing range: 26,900-yard (24,597 m) at 30° elevation

The Vickers 10 inch naval gun was used on battleships and armoured cruisers built during the first decade of the 20th century. They were used as the Type 41 10-inch /45-caliber aboard the British-built semi-dreadnought Katori-class battleships and the natively-built Satsuma-class battleships of the Imperial Japanese Navy.

== History ==
=== Japanese service ===
The Type 41 10-inch (254 mm) naval gun was designed by Vickers specifically for the Imperial Japanese Navy, and was of a very similar design to the Vickers-built Mark VII guns produced initially for the Chilean Navy and later used in Royal Navy service.

The Katori class used these weapons as secondary armament. The Satsuma class was originally intended to be built with all 12-inch (300 mm) guns, which would have made this class the first true all big gun dreadnought class in the world; however, budgetary constraints forced the Japanese navy to use a mixture of 12 and 10-inch guns, as per the previous Kashima class.

The gun was officially designated as "Type 41" from the 41st year of the reign of Emperor Meiji on 25 December 1908. It was further re-designated in centimeters on 5 October 1917 as part of the standardization process for the Imperial Japanese Navy to the metric system.

After the scrapping of both the Katori class and the Satsuma class under the terms of the Washington Naval Treaty in 1923, the guns were salvaged and used in coastal artillery batteries. The guns formerly on the Aki were re-used in fortifications around Tokyo Bay.

The Type 41 10-inch gun fired a 518-pound (235.0 kg) shell with either an armor-piercing, high-explosive or general-purpose warhead.

=== United Kingdom service ===
Vickers supplied 5 of their 10-inch 45-calibre guns for use on the battleship Libertad that they were building for Chile. Britain took the ship over in 1903 as HMS Triumph, and the guns were designated BL 10 inch Mk VII in UK service. These guns fired a 500-pound (226.8 kg) projectile using 146 pounds 12 ounces (66.56 kg) of cordite MD propellant.

=== Italian service ===
The first two of the Pisa-class armoured cruisers were each fitted with four of these guns.

== See also ==
=== Weapons of comparable role, performance and era ===
- EOC 10-inch /45 naval gun : EOC equivalent
