= Japanese battleship Kashima =

Katori-class battleship

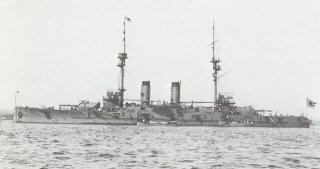
- Kashima at anchor

History

Japan
- Name: Kashima
- Namesake: Kashima Shrine
- Ordered: 1904
- Builder: Armstrong Whitworth, Elswick
- Yard number: 755
- Laid down: 29 February 1904
- Launched: 22 March 1905
- Completed: 23 May 1906
- Out of service: April 1922
- Stricken: 20 September 1923
- Fate: Scrapped, 1924

General characteristics
- Class & type: Katori-class semi-dreadnought battleship
- Displacement: 16,383 long tons (16,646 t) (normal)
- Length: 473 ft 7 in (144.3 m)
- Beam: 78 ft 2 in (23.8 m)
- Draught: 26 ft 4 in (8.03 m)
- Installed power: 20 Niclausse boilers; 15,800 ihp (11,800 kW)
- Propulsion: 2 shafts; 2 triple-expansion steam engines
- Speed: 18 knots (33 km/h; 21 mph)
- Range: 12,000 nmi (22,000 km; 14,000 mi) at 11 knots (20 km/h; 13 mph)
- Complement: 864
- Armament: 2 × twin 12 in (305 mm) guns; 4 × single 10 in (254 mm) guns; 10 × twin 6 in (152 mm) guns; 12 × single 12-pdr 3 in (76 mm) guns; 3 × single 3-pdr (1.9 in (47 mm)) guns; 5 × 18 in (450 mm) torpedo tubes
- Armour: Belt: 3.5–9 in (89–229 mm); Deck: 2–3 in (51–76 mm); Gun turrets: 9 in (229 mm)

Kashima (鹿島 (戦艦), Kashima (senkan)) was the second ship of the two Katori-class pre-dreadnought battleships built for the Imperial Japanese Navy (IJN) in the first decade of the 20th century, the last to be built by British shipyards. Ordered just before the start of the Russo-Japanese War of 1904–1905, the ship was completed a year after its end. She saw no combat during World War I, although the ship was present when Japan joined the Siberian Intervention in 1918. Kashima was disarmed and scrapped in 1923–1924 in accordance with the terms of the Washington Naval Treaty of 1922.

== Design and description ==
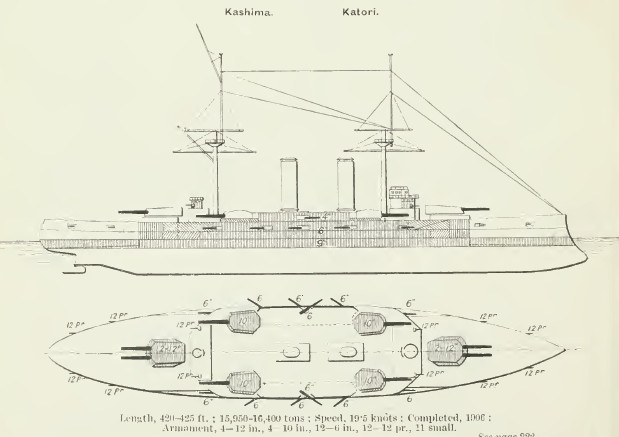
Line drawing of the Katori-class battleships from Brassey's Naval Annual 1912

The Katori-class ships were ordered just before the start of the Russo-Japanese War in 1904 as improved versions of the Royal Navy's King Edward VII-class battleships. Kashima was 473 feet 7 inches (144.3 m) long overall and had a beam of 78 feet 2 inches (23.8 m). She had a full-load draught of 26 feet 4 inches (8.03 m) and normally displaced 16,383 long tons (16,646 t) and had a crew of 864 officers and enlisted men. The ship was powered by two vertical triple-expansion steam engines using steam generated by 20 Niclausse boilers. The engines were rated at 15,800 indicated horsepower (11,800 kW), using forced draught, and were designed to reach a top speed of 18.5 knots (34.3 km/h; 21.3 mph). Kashima, however, reached a top speed of 19.24 knots (35.63 km/h; 22.14 mph) from 17,280 indicated horsepower (12,890 kW) on her sea trials on 4 April 1906. She carried a maximum of 2,200 long tons (2,200 t) of coal and 750 long tons (760 t) of fuel oil which was sprayed on the coal to increase their power. This allowed her to steam for 12,000 nautical miles (22,000 km; 14,000 mi) at a speed of 11 knots (20 km/h; 13 mph).

The ship's main battery consisted of four Elswick 12-inch guns mounted in two twin-gun turrets, one forward and one aft. The secondary armament consisted of four Elswick 10 inch 45 calibre guns mounted in four single-gun turrets positioned on each side of the superstructure. Katori also carried twelve six-inch guns, mounted in casemates on the sides of the hull and in the superstructure. A number of smaller guns were carried for defence against torpedo boats. These included a dozen QF 12-pounder guns and three 47-millimetre (1.9 in) QF 3 pounder Hotchkiss guns. She was also armed with five submerged 18-inch torpedo tubes, two on each broadside and one in the stern.

Kashima's waterline armour belt consisted of Krupp cemented armour and was 3.5–9 inches (89–229 mm) thick. The armour of her main gun turrets had a maximum thickness of 9 in (229 mm) and her deck ranged from 2 to 3 inches (51 to 76 mm) in thickness.

== Construction and career ==
Kashima, named for a Shinto shrine in Kashima, Ibaraki, was ordered in January 1904 from Armstrong Whitworth. The ship was laid down at their Elswick shipyard on 29 February 1904 as yard number 755. She was launched on 22 March 1905, and completed on 23 May 1906. Kashima departed Britain on 31 May on her maiden voyage and shakedown cruise and arrived at Yokosuka on 4 August 1906.

Whilst conducting gunnery training in Hiroshima Bay on 16 September 1907, brown powder propellant in Kashima's starboard rear 10-inch (250 mm) gun mount ignited when it came in contact with burning residue from the previous shot. The fire killed seven officers and 27 enlisted men and wounded two officers and six enlisted men.

When World War I began, Kashima was in a refit at Maizuru Naval Arsenal that lasted until March 1915. The ship was assigned to the 2nd Battleship Squadron when her refit was completed and became the squadron's flagship in 1916. Kashima joined her sister ship Katori in the 5th Battleship Squadron as its flagship in 1918 and both ships covered the landing of Japanese troops in Siberia in August of that year as Japan intervened in the Russian Civil War.

On 3 March 1921, Katori, escorted by Kashima, departed Yokohama bound for Great Britain carrying Crown Prince Hirohito, the first Japanese crown prince to travel abroad. The ships arrived at Portsmouth on 9 May and Hirohito disembarked to tour Europe; they returned home several months later. To comply with the terms of the Washington Naval Treaty the ship was disarmed in April 1922, stricken from the Navy List on 20 September 1923 and the removal of her armor was completed by February 1924. Mitsubishi won the public auction conducted 26–27 April with a price of 238,900 yen and had to pay an additional 35,000 yen to have her towed to Nagasaki for scrapping. The company finished the job on 24 November. Her guns were turned over to the Imperial Japanese Army for use as coastal artillery; her main gun turrets were installed around Tokyo Bay and on Iki Island in the Strait of Tsushima. The rest of her guns were placed in reserve and ultimately scrapped in 1943.
