= Katori-class battleship =

Imperial Japanese Navy's Katori-class of pre-dreadnought battleships

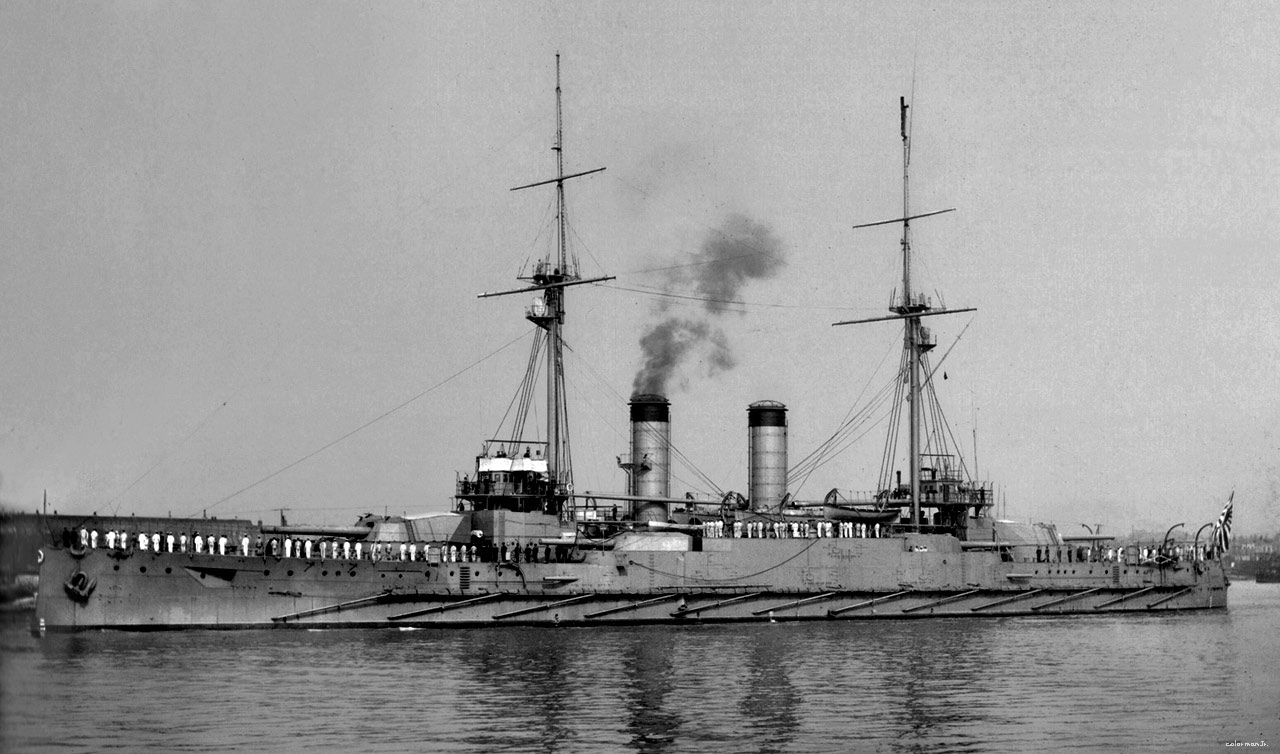
- Newly completed Kashima at anchor, 1906

Class overview
- Name: Katori class
- Builders: Vickers, Sons and Maxim; Armstrong Whitworth
- Operators: Imperial Japanese Navy
- Preceded by: Mikasa
- Succeeded by: Satsuma class
- Built: 1904–1906
- In service: 1906–1922
- In commission: 1906–1923
- Completed: 2
- Scrapped: 2

General characteristics
- Type: Pre-dreadnought battleship
- Displacement: 15,950–16,383 long tons (16,206–16,646 t)
- Length: 456.25–470.6 ft (139.1–143.4 m)
- Beam: 78–78.16 ft (23.8–23.8 m)
- Draught: 26.6–27 ft (8.1–8.2 m)
- Installed power: 20 Niclausse boilers; 15,600–16,000 ihp (11,600–11,900 kW)
- Propulsion: 2 shafts, 2 triple-expansion steam engines
- Speed: 18 knots (33 km/h; 21 mph)
- Range: 12,000 nmi (22,000 km; 14,000 mi) at 11 knots (20 km/h; 13 mph)
- Complement: 864
- Armament: 2 × twin 12-inch (305 mm) guns; 4 × single 10-inch (254 mm) guns]; 12 × single 6-inch (152 mm) guns; 12–16 × single 3-inch (76.2 mm) guns; 3 × single 1.9 in (47 mm) guns; 5 × 18 in (457 mm) torpedo tubes
- Armour: Waterline belt: 2.5–9 in (64–229 mm); Deck: 1–3 in (25–76 mm); Barbettes: 5–12 in (127–305 mm); Gun turrets: 9 in (229 mm); Conning tower: 9 in (229 mm)

The Katori class (香取型戦艦, Katori-gata senkan) was a two-ship class of pre-dreadnought battleships built for the Imperial Japanese Navy (IJN) in the early 1900s. As Japan lacked the industrial capacity to build such warships itself, they were designed and built in the UK. They were the last pre-dreadnought battleships to be built for Japan at overseas shipyards, and the last to be equipped with a ram. The ships were delivered after the end of the Russo-Japanese War of 1904–1905. They saw no action during World War I, although both were present when Japan joined the Siberian Intervention in 1918. They were disarmed and scrapped in 1923–1925 in accordance with the terms of the Washington Naval Treaty of 1922.

== Design and description ==
The Katori-class ships were ordered under the 1903 Third Fleet Extension Program. As with the earlier battleships, Japan lacked the technology and capability to construct its own battleships, and turned again to the United Kingdom, placing orders with Armstrong and Vickers in January 1904. The next class of battleships, the Satsuma class, were built in Japan.

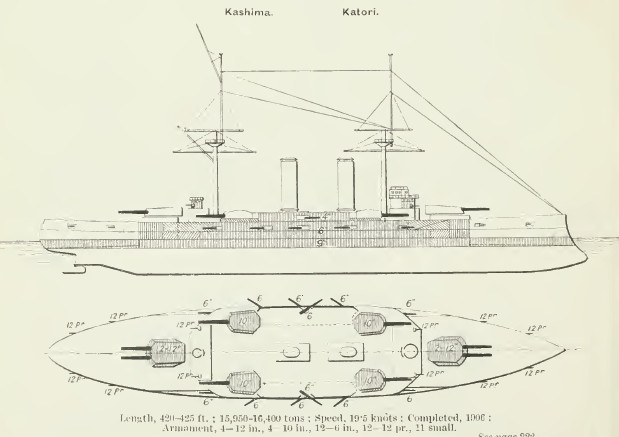
Right elevation and deck plan of the Katori-class battleships from Brassey's Naval Annual 1912

The design of the Katori class was a modified and improved version of the King Edward VII-class battleships of the Royal Navy. The Vickers-built Katori was slightly smaller than her sister ship, Kashima. They had an overall length of 456.25–470.6 feet (139.1–143.4 m), a beam of 78–78.16 feet (23.8–23.8 m), and a normal draught of 26.6–27 feet (8.1–8.2 m). They displaced 15,950–16,383 long tons (16,206–16,646 t) at normal load. The crew consisted of 864 officers and enlisted men.

=== Propulsion ===
The ships were powered by a pair of four-cylinder vertical triple-expansion steam engines, each driving one propeller, using steam generated by 20 Niclausse boilers using a mixture of coal and fuel oil. The engines were rated at 15,600–16,600 indicated horsepower (11,600–12,400 kW) and designed to reach a top speed of 18.5 knots (34.3 km/h; 21.3 mph) although they proved to be faster during their sea trials. Kashima reached a top speed of 19.2 knots (35.6 km/h; 22.1 mph) using 17,280 ihp (12,890 kW) and Katori made 19.5 knots (36.1 km/h; 22.4 mph) from 18,500 ihp (13,800 kW). The ships carried a maximum of 2,150 tonnes (2,120 long tons) of coal and 377–750 long tons (383–762 t) of fuel oil which allowed them to steam for 12,000 nautical miles (22,000 km; 14,000 mi) at a speed of 11 knots (20 km/h; 13 mph).

=== Armament ===
The armament of the Katori class ships differed due to being built by competing shipyards. Kashima had Armstrong-built guns, while Katori had Vickers-built guns. The primary armament of both ships was four 45-caliber 12-inch (305 mm) guns in twin-gun turrets fore and aft of the ships superstructure. Kashima had four EOC 12-inch Type 41 guns, while Katori had four Vickers 12-inch Type 41 guns. These were more powerful than the 40-caliber guns on Mikasa and earlier Japanese battleships. They fired 850-pound (386 kg) projectiles at a muzzle velocity of 2,800 ft/s (850 m/s).

The secondary armament of the King Edward VII class introduced an intermediate caliber of 9.2-inch (234 mm) guns between the primary 12-inch guns and the tertiary 6-inch guns and the Japanese upgraded these to 45-caliber 10-inch (254 mm) guns in four single turrets mounted at the corners of the superstructure. Kashima had four EOC 10-inch Type 41 guns, while Katori had four Vickers 10-inch Type 41 guns. The guns had a muzzle velocity of 2,707 ft/s (825 m/s) when firing 500-pound (227 kg) shells.

The tertiary armament of both ships was twelve 45-caliber 6-inch (152 mm) guns, compared to the ten of the King Edward VIIs. Kashima had twelve EOC 6-inch Type 41 guns, while Katori had twelve Vickers 6-inch Type 41 guns. Ten of these guns were mounted in the hull and the remaining two were placed in the superstructure between the 10-inch gun turrets. Their 100-pound (45 kg) shells had a muzzle velocity of 2,300 ft/s (700 m/s).

Protection against torpedo boat attacks was provided by twelve to sixteen QF 12-pounder 12-cwt (Note: "Cwt" is the abbreviation for hundredweight, 12 cwt referring to the weight of the gun.) guns and three 47-millimetre (1.9 in) QF three-pounder Hotchkiss guns. The 12-pounders fired 3-inch (76 mm), 12.5-pound (5.7 kg) projectiles at a muzzle velocity of 2,359 ft/s (719 m/s). The ships were also equipped with five submerged 18-inch torpedo tubes, two on each broadside and one in the stern.

=== Armor ===
The waterline main belt of the Katori-class vessels consisted of Krupp cemented armour 7 feet 6 inches (2.3 m) high, of which 2 feet 6 inches (0.8 m) was above the waterline at normal load. It had a maximum thickness of 9 inches (229 mm) amidships. It was only 2.5 inches (64 mm) inches thick at the ends of the ship and was surmounted by a six-inch, 15-foot (4.6 m) strake of armour that ran between the main gun barbettes and protected most of the secondary guns. The barbettes for the main guns were 5–12 inches (127–305 mm) thick and those for the intermediate turrets were protected by six inches of armour. The armour of the main gun barbette hoods had a maximum thickness of nine inches and those of the intermediate barbettes were 6–8 inches (152–203 mm) thick. The sides of the superstructure between the intermediate barbettes had 4 inches (102 mm) of armour.

The flat portion of the deck armour was two inches (51 mm) thick and three inches thick amidships where it sloped down to the bottom of the armour belt. This significantly improved the ships' protection as any shell that penetrated their vertical armour also had to penetrate the sloping deck before it could reach the machinery compartments or magazines. Outside the central armoured citadel, the sloped deck had a thickness of two point five inches (64 mm). The conning tower was protected by nine inches of armour.

== Ships ==
Construction data
Ship	Builder	Laid down	Launched	Completed	Fate
Katori	Vickers, Barrow-in-Furness	27 April 1904	4 July 1905	20 May 1906	Sold for scrap, April 1924
Kashima	Armstrong, Elswick	29 February 1904	22 March 1905	23 May 1906	Broken up, 1924–1925

== Service ==
Whilst conducting gunnery training in Hiroshima Bay on 16 September 1907, brown powder propellant in Kashima's starboard rear 10-inch gun mount ignited when it came in contact with burning residue from the previous shot. The fire killed seven officers and 27 enlisted men; wounding two officers and six enlisted men. When World War I began, Kashima was refitting while Katori was assigned to the 1st Battleship Squadron. The former was assigned to the 2nd Battleship Squadron when her refit was completed in 1915 and became the squadron's flagship in 1916. Katori began a refit in 1914 that lasted until late 1916 and was assigned to the 5th Battleship Squadron upon its completion. Kashima joined her sister in the 5th Battleship Squadron as its flagship in 1918 and both ships covered the landing of Japanese troops in Siberia in August of that year as Japan decided to intervene in the Russian Civil War.

In 1921, Katori, escorted by Kashima, carried Crown Prince Hirohito on his tour of Europe where he met King George V. Both ships were disarmed in 1923 and later scrapped to comply with the terms of the Washington Naval Treaty. All of their guns were turned over to the Imperial Japanese Army for use as coastal artillery; two of Katori's main-gun turrets were installed around Tokyo Bay and on Iki Island in the Strait of Tsushima. The rest of their guns were placed in reserve and scrapped in 1943.
