= Japanese battleship Katori =

Japanese lead ship of Katori-class

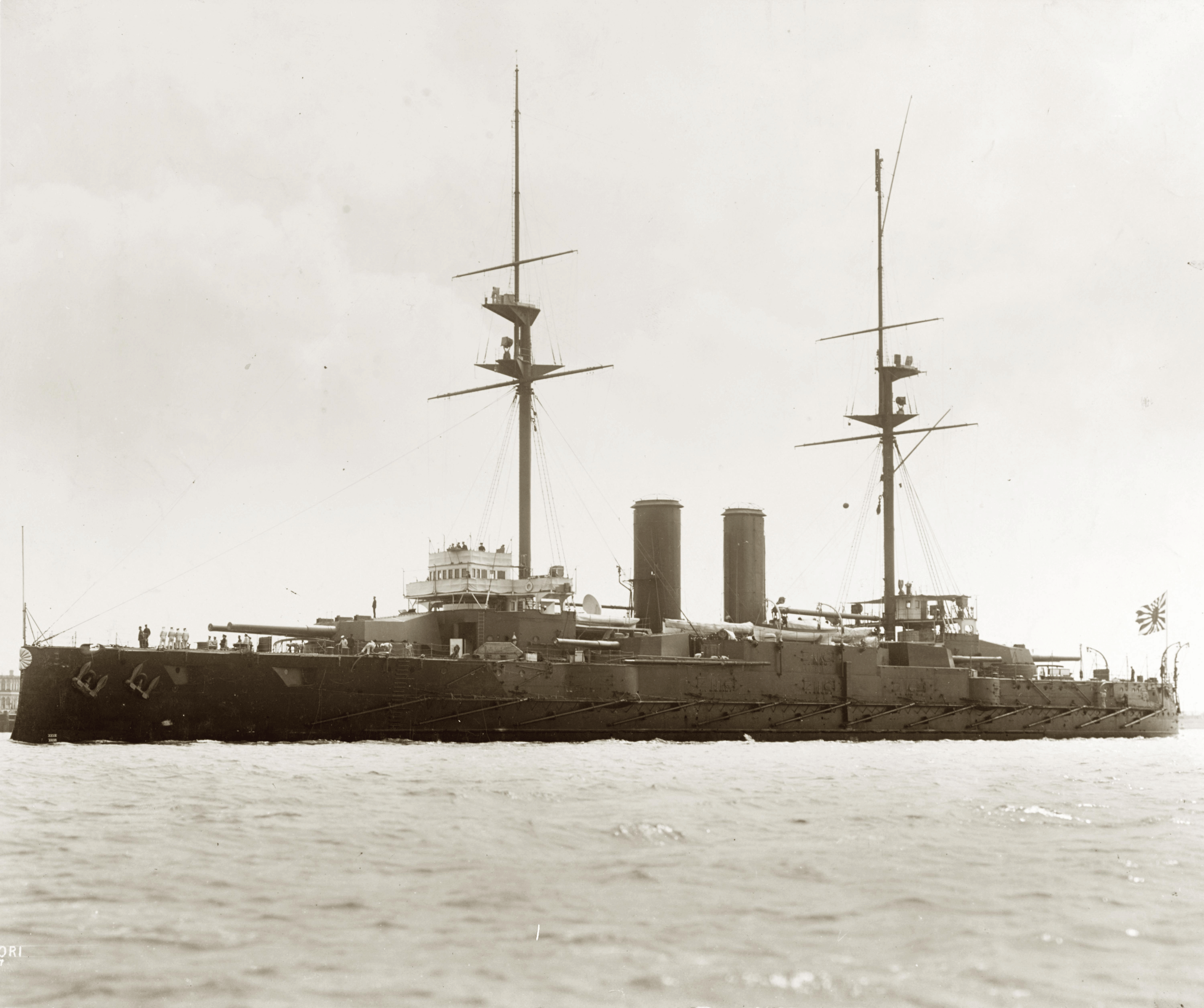
- Katori at anchor

History

Japan
- Name: Katori
- Namesake: Katori Shrine
- Builder: Vickers Barrow-in-Furness, UK
- Laid down: 27 April 1904
- Launched: 4 July 1905
- Commissioned: 20 May 1906
- Decommissioned: 20 September 1923
- Out of service: April 1922
- Stricken: 23 October 1923
- Fate: Scrapped, 1924–25

General characteristics
- Class & type: Katori-class pre-dreadnought battleship
- Displacement: 15,950 long tons (16,210 t) (normal)
- Length: 456 ft 3 in (139.1 m)
- Beam: 78 ft (23.8 m)
- Draught: 27 ft (8.2 m)
- Installed power: 20 Niclausse boilers; 16,000 shp (12,000 kW)
- Propulsion: 2 shafts, 2 triple-expansion steam engines
- Speed: 18.5 knots (34.3 km/h; 21.3 mph)
- Range: 12,000 nmi (22,000 km; 14,000 mi) at 11 knots (20 km/h; 13 mph)
- Complement: 864
- Armament: 2 × twin 12 in (305 mm) guns; 4 × single 10 in (254 mm) guns; 12 × single 6 in (152 mm) guns; 12 × single 12-pdr (3 in (76 mm)) guns; 3 × single 3-pdr (1.9 in (47 mm)) guns; 5 × 18 in (450 mm) torpedo tubes
- Armour: Krupp cemented armour; Belt: 3.5–9 in (89–229 mm); Deck: 2–3 in (51–76 mm); Main gun turrets: 9 in (229 mm)

Katori (香取 (戦艦)) was the lead ship of the two Katori-class pre-dreadnought battleships built in the first decade of the 20th century, the last to be built by British shipyards for the Imperial Japanese Navy (IJN). Ordered just before the start of the Russo-Japanese War of 1904–1905, the ship was completed a year after its end. She saw no combat during World War I, although the ship was present when Japan joined the Siberian Intervention in 1918. Katori was disarmed and scrapped in 1923–1925 in accordance with the terms of the Washington Naval Treaty of 1922.

== Design and description ==
The Katori-class ships were ordered just before the start of the Russo-Japanese War in 1904 as improved versions of the Royal Navy’s King Edward VII-class battleships. Katori was 456 feet 3 inches (139.1 m) long overall and had a beam of 78 feet (23.8 m). She had a full-load draught of 27 feet (8.2 m) and normally displaced 15,950 long tons (16,210 t) and had a crew of 864 officers and enlisted men. The ship was powered by two vertical triple-expansion steam engines using steam generated by 20 Niclausse boilers. The engines were rated at 16,000 indicated horsepower (12,000 kW), using forced draught, and were designed to reach a top speed of 18.5 knots (34.3 km/h; 21.3 mph). Katori, however, reached a top speed of 19.5 knots (36.1 km/h; 22.4 mph) from 18,500 indicated horsepower (13,800 kW) on her sea trials. She carried a maximum of 2,150 long tons (2,180 t) of coal and 377 long tons (383 t) of fuel oil which was sprayed on the coal to increase their power. This allowed her to steam for 12,000 nautical miles (22,000 km; 14,000 mi) at a speed of 11 knots (20 km/h; 13 mph).

The ship's main battery consisted of four 12-inch guns mounted in two twin-gun turrets, one forward and one aft. The secondary armament consisted of four 10-inch guns mounted in four single-gun turrets positioned on each side of the superstructure. Katori also carried twelve QF 6-inch guns, mounted in casemates on the sides of the hull and in the superstructure. A number of smaller guns were carried for defence against torpedo boats. These included a dozen 12-pounder guns and three 47-millimetre (1.9 in) 3-pounder Hotchkiss guns. She was also armed with five submerged 18-inch (450 mm) torpedo tubes, two on each broadside and one in the stern.

Katori's waterline armour belt consisted of Krupp cemented armour and was 3.5–9 inches (89–229 mm) thick. The armour of her main gun turrets had a maximum thickness of 9 in (229 mm) and her deck ranged from 2 to 3 inches (51 to 76 mm) in thickness.

== Construction and career ==
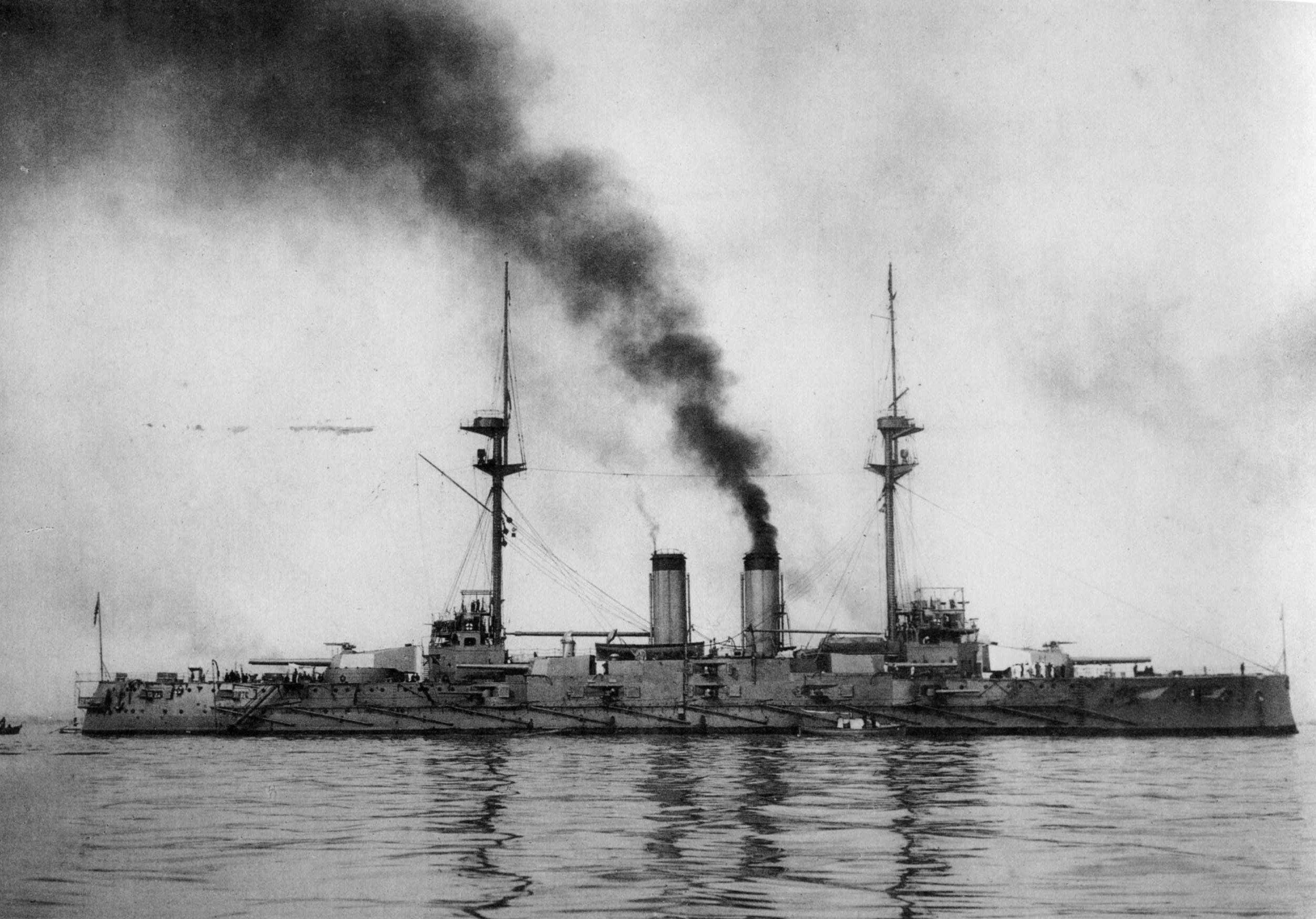
Profile view of Katori

Katori, named for a Shinto shrine in Katori City, was ordered in January 1904 from Vickers. The ship was laid down at their Barrow-in-Furness shipyard on 27 April 1904. She was launched on 4 July 1905, Prince and Princess Arisugawa were on hand for the official launching ceremony. and completed on 20 May 1906. Katori departed Britain on 7 June on her maiden voyage and shakedown cruise and arrived at Yokosuka on 15 August.

In a naval review off Yokosuka on 10 November 1913, she served as the flagship for the Taishō Emperor. Katori occupied the German colony of Saipan, shortly after the start of World War I, on 14 October 1914. Afterward the ship began a refit in 1914 that lasted until late 1916 and was assigned to the 2nd Battleship Squadron upon its completion. During this refit, two 12-pounder anti-aircraft guns were replaced two of the low-angle 12-pounders. She became the flagship of the 5th Battleship Squadron in 1917–18 and served as the flagship for the Japanese commander-in-chief at Nikolayevsk-on-Amur in late 1918 as Japan decided to intervene in the Russian Civil War.

On 3 March 1921, Katori, escorted by Kashima, departed Yokohama bound for Great Britain carrying Crown Prince Hirohito, the first Japanese crown prince to travel abroad. The ships arrived at Portsmouth on 9 May and Hirohito left the ship to tour Europe; he boarded the battleship again in Naples several months later for the voyage home. The ship was disarmed in April 1922, stricken from the Navy List on 20 September 1923 and scrapped at Maizuru Naval Arsenal by 29 January 1925 to comply with the terms of the Washington Naval Treaty. Her guns were turned over to the Imperial Japanese Army for use as coastal artillery; one main-gun turret was emplaced near Tokyo Bay in 1925–1932 and another was installed on Iki Island in the Strait of Tsushima in 1929. The remaining guns were placed in reserve and ultimately scrapped in 1943.
