= Japanese cruiser Ikoma =

1906 Tsukuba-class cruiser

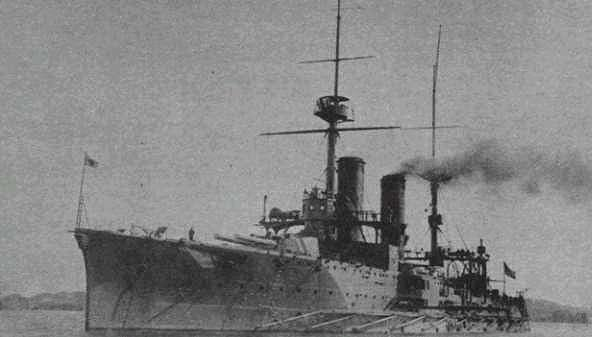
- Japanese battlecruiser Ikoma

History

Empire of Japan
- Name: Ikoma
- Ordered: 1904 Fiscal Year
- Builder: Kure Naval Arsenal
- Laid down: 15 March 1905
- Launched: 9 April 1906
- Commissioned: 24 March 1908
- Stricken: 20 September 1923
- Fate: Scrapped, 20 September 1923

General characteristics
- Class & type: Tsukuba-class armored cruiser
- Length: 134.11 m (440.0 ft) waterline; 137.11 m (449.8 ft) overall
- Beam: 22.80 m (74.8 ft)
- Draught: 7.95 m (26.1 ft)
- Installed power: 20,500 shp (15,290 kW)
- Propulsion: Two shaft reciprocating VTE steam engine; 20 Miyabara boilers
- Speed: 20.5 knots (38 km/h)
- Range: 5,000 nautical miles (9,000 km) at 14 knots (26 km/h)
- Complement: 879
- Armament: 4 × 12-inch (305 mm) guns; 12 × 6-inch (152 mm) guns; 12 × 120-millimetre (4.724 in) guns; 4 × QF 3-pounder Hotchkiss; 3 × 450 mm torpedo tubes
- Armor: Belt: 100–180 mm (3.9–7.1 in); Barbette & turret: 180 mm (7.1 in); Conning tower: 200 mm (7.9 in); Deck: 75 mm (3.0 in)

Ikoma (生駒) was the second vessel in the two-ship Tsukuba class of armoured cruisers in the Imperial Japanese Navy. She was named after Mount Ikoma located on the border of Osaka and Nara prefecture. On 28 August 1912, Ikoma was re-classified as a battlecruiser.

== Background ==
Construction of the Tsukuba-class cruisers was ordered under the June 1904 Emergency Fleet Replenishment Budget of the Russo-Japanese War, spurred on by the unexpected loss of the battleships Yashima and Hatsuse to naval mines in the early stages of the war. These were the first major capital ships to be designed and constructed entirely by Japan in a Japanese shipyard, albeit with imported weaponry and numerous components. However, Tsukuba and Ikoma were designed and completed in a very short time, and suffered from numerous technical and design problems, including strength of its hull, stability and mechanical failures. The ship was reclassified as a battlecruiser in 1912.

== Design ==
The Tsukuba-class design had a conventional armored cruiser hull design, powered by two vertical triple-expansion steam engines, with twenty Miyabara boilers, yielding 20,500 shp (15,300 kW) design speed of 20.5 knots (38.0 km/h; 23.6 mph) and a range of 5,000 nautical miles (9,000 km) at 14 knots (26 km/h; 16 mph). During speed trials in Hiroshima Bay prior to commissioning, Tsukuba attained a top speed of 21.75 knots (40.28 km/h; 25.03 mph). Ikoma was one of the first ships in the Japanese navy with boilers capable of burning either coal or heavy fuel oil. In terms of armament, the Tsukuba class was one of the most heavily armed cruisers of its time, with four 12-inch 41st Year Type guns as the main battery, mounted in twin gun turrets to the fore and aft, along the centerline of the vessel. Secondary armament consisted of twelve 6-inch (152 mm) guns and twelve 4.7-inch 41st Year Type guns, and four QF 3-pounder Hotchkiss guns.

== Service record ==
Ikoma was laid down on 15 March 1905, launched 9 April 1906 and commissioned on 24 March 1908 at Kure Naval Arsenal, with Captain Egarashi Yasutaro as her chief equipping officer and first captain.

Shortly after commissioning at the Kure Naval Arsenal, Ikoma escorted the United States Navy’s Great White Fleet through Japanese waters on its around-the-world voyage in October 1908.

In 1910, Ikoma was sent on a voyage to Argentina to attend that nation’s independence centennial celebrations. From Buenos Aires, she continued on across the Atlantic Ocean to London, England and to other ports in Europe and returned to Japan via the Indian Ocean, thus circumnavigating the globe.

Ikoma served in World War I, initially during the blockade of the German port of Qingdao in China during the siege of Qingdao from September 1914 as part of Japan's contribution to the Allied war effort under the Anglo-Japanese Alliance. After the fall of the city, Tsukuba was sent out as part of the search for the German East Asia Squadron in the South Pacific until the destruction of the German squadron in the Battle of the Falklands in December 1914. From 1 November 1914 to 17 January 1915, Ikoma was based out of Hong Kong, Singapore and Townsville, Australia, protecting British colonies and shipping from German commerce raiders.

On 4 December 1915, Ikoma was in a fleet review off of Yokohama, attended by Emperor Taishō in which 124 ships participated. A similar fleet review was held again off Yokohama on 25 October 1916. Ikoma remained in Japanese home waters in 1916 and 1917.

Ikoma was a victim of the Washington Naval Agreement of 1922 and was scrapped at Mitsubishi Heavy Industries Nagasaki shipyards in compliance with that accord. She was removed from the navy list on 20 September 1923.
