= Ibuki =

Ibuki may refer to:

== Places ==
- Mount Ibuki, Japan
- Ibuki, Shiga, a former town in Japan

== Ships ==
- Japanese ship Ibuki, several ships
- Ibuki-class armored cruiser
- Ibuki-class cruiser

== Other uses ==
- Ibuki (name), a Japanese surname and given name
- Ibuki (Kodō album), 1996
- Ibuki (Yoshida Brothers album), 1999
- Ibuki (satellite), the world's first greenhouse-gas-monitoring satellite
