= Japanese ship Kurama =

Kurama may refer to one of the following ships of the Japanese Navy:

- Japanese battlecruiser Kurama, an Ibuki-class armoured cruiser launched in 1907; re-classed as a battlecruiser in 1912; scrapped in 1923.
- JDS Kurama, a Shirane-class destroyer launched in 1979
