= Type 41 =

Type 41 may refer to:

== Japanese Guns ==
- Type 41 75 mm Mountain Gun, a Japanese weapon
- Type 41 75 mm Cavalry Gun, a Japanese weapon
- Type 41 3-inch (7.62 cm)/40-caliber naval gun, a Japanese weapon
- Type 41 4.7 inch 40 caliber naval gun, a Japanese weapon
- Type 41 6-inch (152 mm)/40-caliber naval gun, a Japanese weapon
- Type 41 6-inch (152 mm)/45-caliber naval gun, a Japanese weapon
- Type 41 6-inch (152 mm)/50-caliber naval gun, a Japanese weapon
- Type 41 8-inch (203 mm)/45-caliber naval gun, a Japanese weapon
- Type 41 10 inch 40-caliber naval gun, a Japanese weapon
- Type 41 10 inch 45 caliber naval gun, a Japanese weapon
- Type 41 12-inch (305 mm)/40-caliber naval gun, a Japanese weapon
- Type 41 12-inch 45 caliber naval gun, a Japanese weapon
- Type 41 14-inch (356 mm)/45-caliber naval gun, a Japanese weapon

== British warships ==
- Type 41 frigate, the Leopard class of anti-aircraft defence frigates built for the Royal Navy

== Land vehicles ==
- Bugatti Royale, formally named Type 41
- Lotus 41 race car
- British Rail Class 41 (HST) locomotive
- British Rail Class 41 (Warship Class) locomotive
