= Japanese ship Tsukuba =

Two ships of the Imperial Japanese Navy were named Tsukuba:

- Japanese corvette Tsukuba, a screw corvette launched in 1853 as HMS Malacca she was acquired by Japan about 1890 and renamed. She was stricken in 1906
- Japanese cruiser Tsukuba, a Tsukuba-class cruiser launched in 1905 and sunk in 1917
