= Japanese cruiser Tsukuba =

1905 Tsukuba-class cruiser

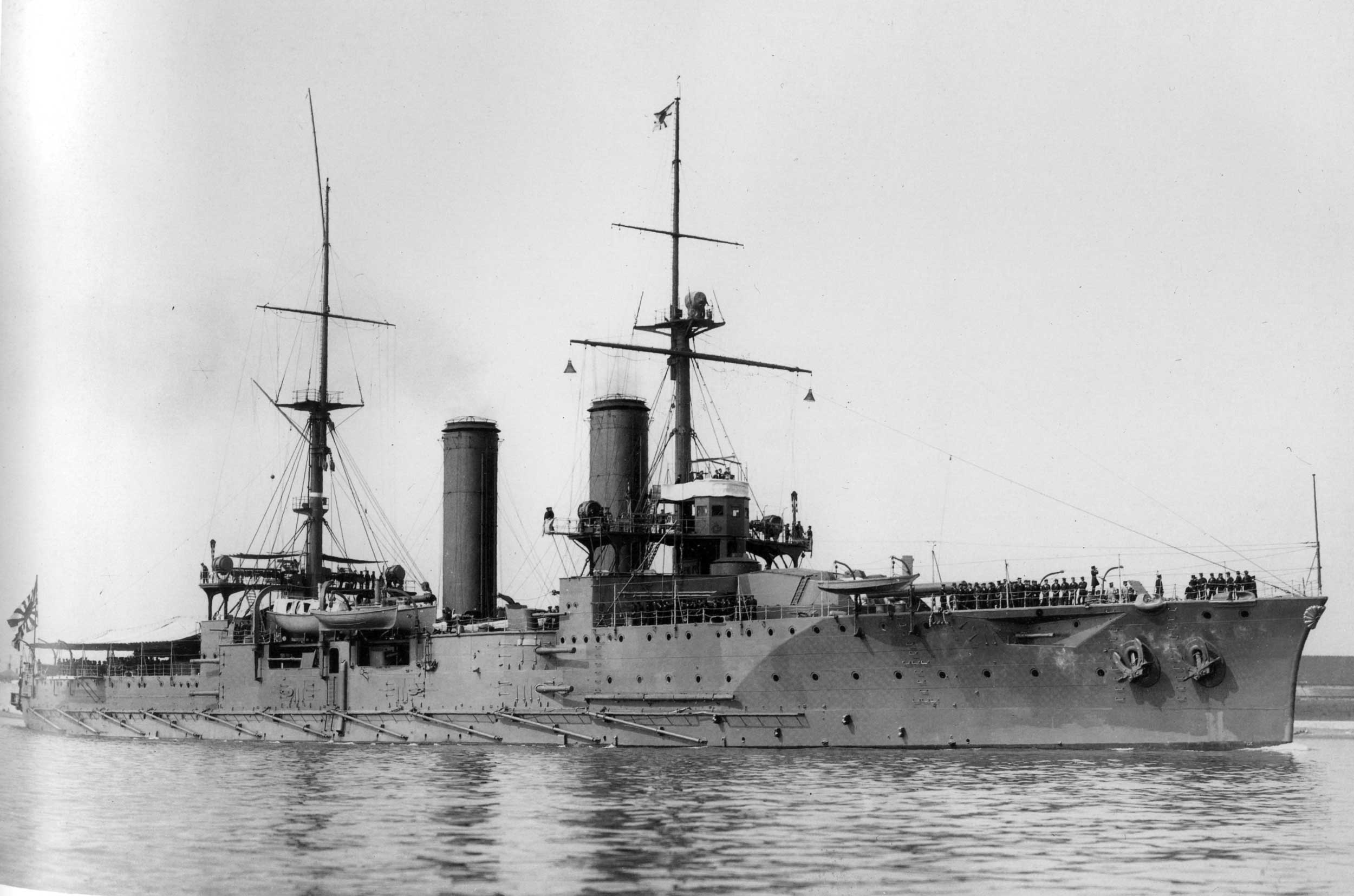
- Tsukuba before 1913 refit.

History

Empire of Japan
- Name: Tsukuba
- Ordered: 1904 Fiscal Year
- Builder: Kure Naval Arsenal
- Laid down: 14 January 1905
- Launched: 26 December 1905
- Commissioned: 14 January 1907
- Reclassified: battlecruiser (1912)
- Stricken: 1 September 1917
- Fate: Explosion, Tokyo Bay 14 January 1917

General characteristics
- Class & type: Tsukuba-class armored cruiser
- Displacement: 13,750 long tons (13,970 t) (normal); 15,400 long tons (15,600 t) (max)
- Length: 134.11 m (440.0 ft) waterline; 137.11 m (449.8 ft) overall
- Beam: 22.80 m (74.8 ft)
- Draught: 7.95 m (26.1 ft)
- Installed power: 20,500 shp (15,290 kW)
- Propulsion: Two shaft reciprocating VTE steam engine; 20 Miyabara boilers
- Speed: 20.5 knots (38 km/h)
- Range: 5,000 nautical miles (9,000 km) at 14 knots (26 km/h)
- Complement: 879
- Armament: 4 × 12-inch (305 mm) guns; 12 × 6-inch (152 mm) guns; 12 × 120-millimetre (4.724 in) guns; 4 × QF 3-pounder Hotchkiss; 3 × 450 mm (18 in) torpedo tubes
- Armor: Belt: 100–180 mm (3.9–7.1 in); Barbette & turret: 180 mm (7.1 in); Conning tower: 200 mm (7.9 in); Deck: 75 mm (3.0 in)

Tsukuba (筑波) was the lead ship of the two-ship Tsukuba class of armoured cruisers in the Imperial Japanese Navy. She was named after Mount Tsukuba located in Ibaraki prefecture north of Tokyo. On 28 August 1912, Tsukuba was re-classified as a battlecruiser.

== Background ==
Construction of the Tsukuba-class cruisers was ordered under the June 1904 Emergency Fleet Replenishment Budget of the Russo-Japanese War, spurred on by the unexpected loss of the battleships Yashima and Hatsuse to naval mines in the early stages of the war. These were the first major capital ships to be designed and constructed entirely by Japan in a Japanese shipyard, albeit with imported weaponry and numerous components. However, Tsukuba was designed and completed in a very short time, and suffered from numerous technical and design problems, including strength of its hull, stability and mechanical failures. The ship was reclassified as a battlecruiser in 1912.

== Design ==
The Tsukuba-class design had a conventional armored cruiser hull design, powered by two vertical triple-expansion steam engines, with twenty Miyabara boilers, yielding 20,500 shp (15,300 kW) design speed of 20.5 knots (38.0 km/h; 23.6 mph) and a range of 5,000 nautical miles (9,000 km) at 14 knots (26 km/h; 16 mph). During speed trials in Hiroshima Bay prior to commissioning, Tsukuba attained a top speed of 21.75 knots (40.28 km/h; 25.03 mph).

In terms of armament, the Tsukuba-class was one of the most heavily armed cruisers of its time, with four 12-inch 41st Year Type guns as the main battery, mounted in twin gun turrets to the fore and aft, along the centerline of the vessel. Secondary armament consisted of twelve 6-inch (152 mm) guns and twelve 4.7-inch 41st Year Type guns, and four QF 3-pounder Hotchkiss guns.

== Service record ==
Tsukuba was laid down on 14 January 1905, launched 26 December 1905 and commissioned on 14 January 1907 at Kure Naval Arsenal, with Captain Heitarō Takenouchi as her chief equipping officer and first commander.

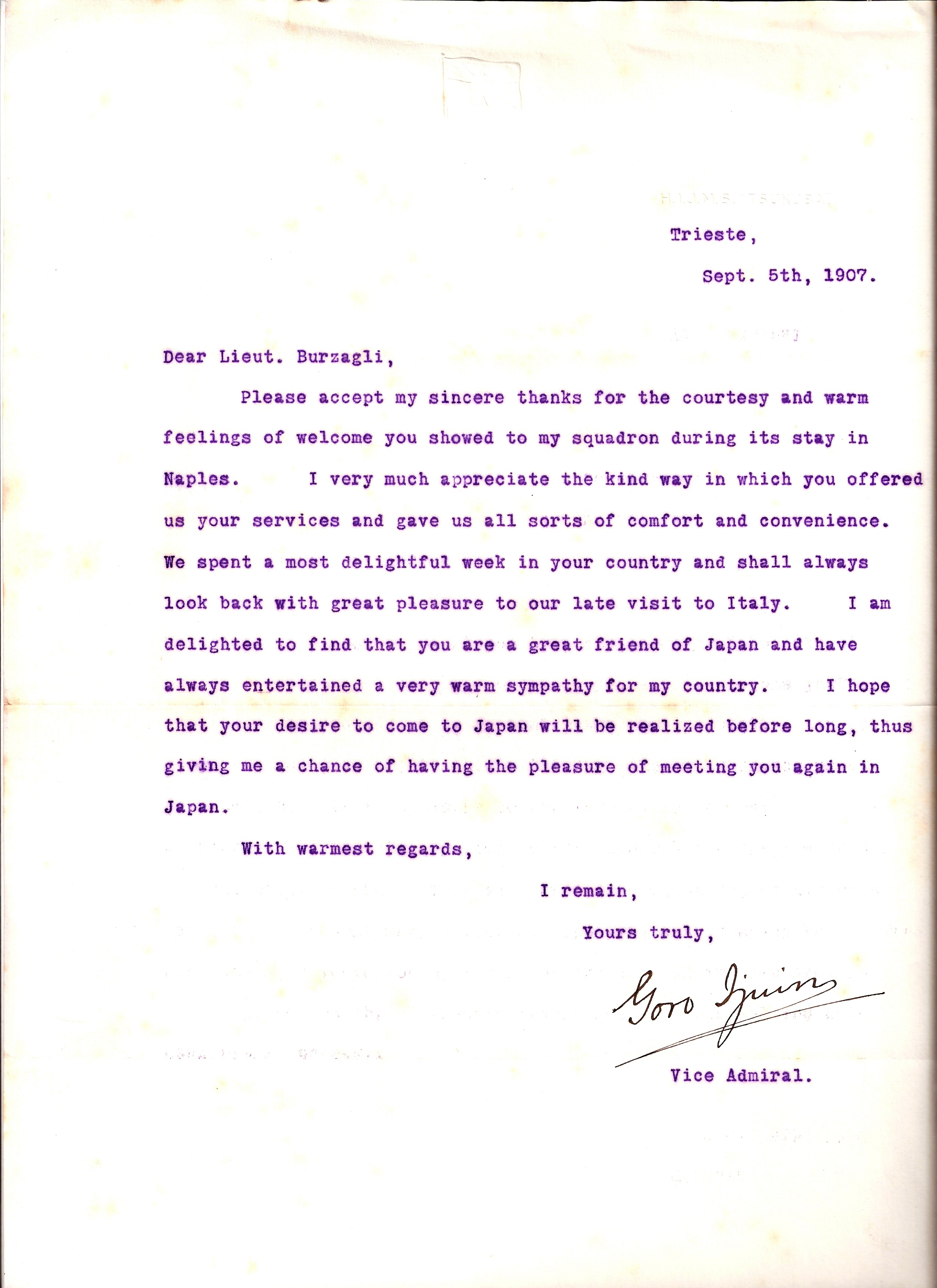
Letter from Vice admiral Ijuin Gorō to Italian Royal Navy Lieutenant Ernesto Burzagli, who had been assigned to the Imperial Japanese Navy as a naval attaché during the Russo-Japanese War 1904-1905, thanking him for courtesies extended to the Imperial Japanese Navy Second Fleet in Naples.

Shortly after commissioning, and with Vice Admiral Ijuin Gorō on board, Tsukuba and Chitose were sent on a voyage to the United States to attend the International Naval Review by President Theodore Roosevelt as a part of Jamestown Exposition of 1907, the tricentennial celebrations marking the founding of the Jamestown Colony. They then traveled on to Portsmouth, England to pay respect to the fellow Royal Navy in the Anglo-Japanese Alliance, and attended the 25th anniversary of Kiel Regatta in Kiel, Germany, where she received the imperial visit of Kaiser Wilhelm II. She then visited Flushing and Ostend in Flanders, Holland; Brest and Bordeaux in France; Vigo, Lisbon, Naples, Malta, Venice and Trieste before returning to Japan via the Suez Canal and Indian Ocean, thus circumnavigating the globe.

After her return to Japan, Tsukuba was assigned to Commander Hirose Katsuhiko (the brother of the war hero Hirose Takeo) and escorted the United States Navy’s Great White Fleet through Japanese waters on its around-the-world voyage in October 1908. Commander Isamu Takeshita was the commander of Tsukuba from July through September 1912, followed by Captain Kantarō Suzuki to May 1913, and Commander Katō Hiroharu from December 1913 to May 1914.

Tsukuba served in World War I, initially during the blockade of the German port of Qingdao in China during the siege of Qingdao from September 1914 as part of Japan's contribution to the Allied war effort under the Anglo-Japanese Alliance. After the fall of the city, Tsukuba was sent out as part of the search for the German East Asia Squadron in the South Pacific until the destruction of the German squadron in the Battle of the Falklands in December 1914. Tsukuba remained in Japanese home waters in 1915 and 1916.

On 4 December 1915, Tsukuba was in a fleet review off of Yokohama, attended by Emperor Taishō in which 124 ships participated. A similar fleet review was held again off Yokohama on 25 October 1916.

On 14 January 1917, Tsukuba exploded while in port at Yokosuka. Some 200 crewmen were killed immediately, and over 100 more were drowned as the battlecruiser sank in shallow waters within twenty minutes, with a total loss of 305 men. The force of the explosion broke windows in Kamakura, more than twelve kilometers away. At the time of the disaster, more than 400 crewmen were on shore leave, which is why so many survived. The cause of the explosion was later attributed to a fire in her ammunition magazine, possibly through spontaneous combustion from deterioration of the Shimose powder in her shells.

The masts, bridge and smokestacks of the vessel remained above water, and afterwards, her hulk was raised, and used as a target for naval aviation training. It was formally removed from the navy list on 1 September 1917 and broken up for scrap in 1918.
