= Japanese ship Ibuki =

Ibuki may refer to one of the following ships of the Imperial Japanese Navy named after Mount Ibuki:

- Japanese battlecruiser Ibuki, an Ibuki-class armoured cruiser launched in 1907; re-classed as a battlecruiser in 1912; scrapped in 1923.
- Japanese cruiser Ibuki (1943), an incomplete modified Mogami-class heavy cruiser launched in 1943; converted to a light aircraft carrier; scrapped in 1947.
- JDS Ibuki, a Kasado-class minesweeper, launched in 1967 and decommissioned in 1989.

== See also ==
- Ibuki (disambiguation)
