= Ibuki-class armored cruiser =

Japanese class of armored cruisers

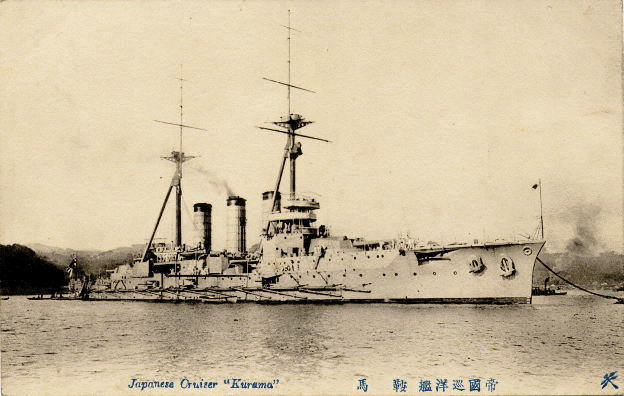
- A postcard of Kurama at anchor, 1913

Class overview
- Name: Ibuki
- Builders: Kure Naval Arsenal; Yokosuka Naval Arsenal
- Operators: Imperial Japanese Navy
- Preceded by: Tsukuba class
- Succeeded by: Kongō class
- Subclasses: Ibuki
- Built: 1905–1911
- In service: 1909–1921
- Completed: 2
- Scrapped: 2

General characteristics (Kurama)
- Type: Armored cruiser (later reclassified as battlecruiser)
- Displacement: 14,636 long tons (14,871 t) (normal); 15,595 long tons (15,845 t) (full load)
- Length: 450 feet (137.2 m) (p.p.); 485 feet (147.8 m) (o.a.)
- Beam: 75 feet 6 inches (23.0 m)
- Draft: 26 feet 1 inch (8.0 m)
- Installed power: 22,500 shp (16,800 kW); 28 × Miyahara water-tube boilers
- Propulsion: 2 × shafts; 2 × Vertical triple-expansion steam engines
- Speed: 21.25 knots (39.36 km/h; 24.45 mph)
- Complement: 817
- Armament: 2 × twin 12-inch 41st Year Type guns; 4 × twin 8-inch (200 mm) 41st Year Type guns; 14 × single 4.7-inch (120 mm) 41st Year Type guns; 4 × single 3-inch (76 mm) guns; 4 × single 3-inch (76 mm) AA guns; 3 × submerged 17.7 in (450 mm) torpedo tubes
- Armor: Belt: 102–178 mm (4–7 in); Deck: 51 mm (2.0 in); Bulkheads: 25 mm (1.0 in); Barbettes: 51–178 mm (2.0–7.0 in); Turrets: 229 mm (9.0 in); Conning Tower: 203 mm (8.0 in)

The Ibuki class (伊吹型, Ibuki-gata), also called the Kurama class (鞍馬型, Kurama-gata), was a ship class of two large armoured cruisers (Sōkō jun'yōkan) built for the Imperial Japanese Navy after the Russo-Japanese War of 1904–1905. These ships reflected Japanese experiences during that war as they were designed to fight side-by-side with battleships and were given an armament equal to, or superior to existing Japanese battleships. The development of the battlecruiser the year before Ibuki was completed made her and her sister ship Kurama obsolete before they were completed because the foreign battlecruisers were much more heavily armed and faster.

Both ships played a small role in World War I as they unsuccessfully hunted for the German East Asia Squadron and the commerce-raider SMS Emden and protected troop convoys in the Pacific Ocean shortly after the war began. The ships were sold for scrap in 1923 in accordance with the terms of the Washington Naval Treaty.

== Design and description ==
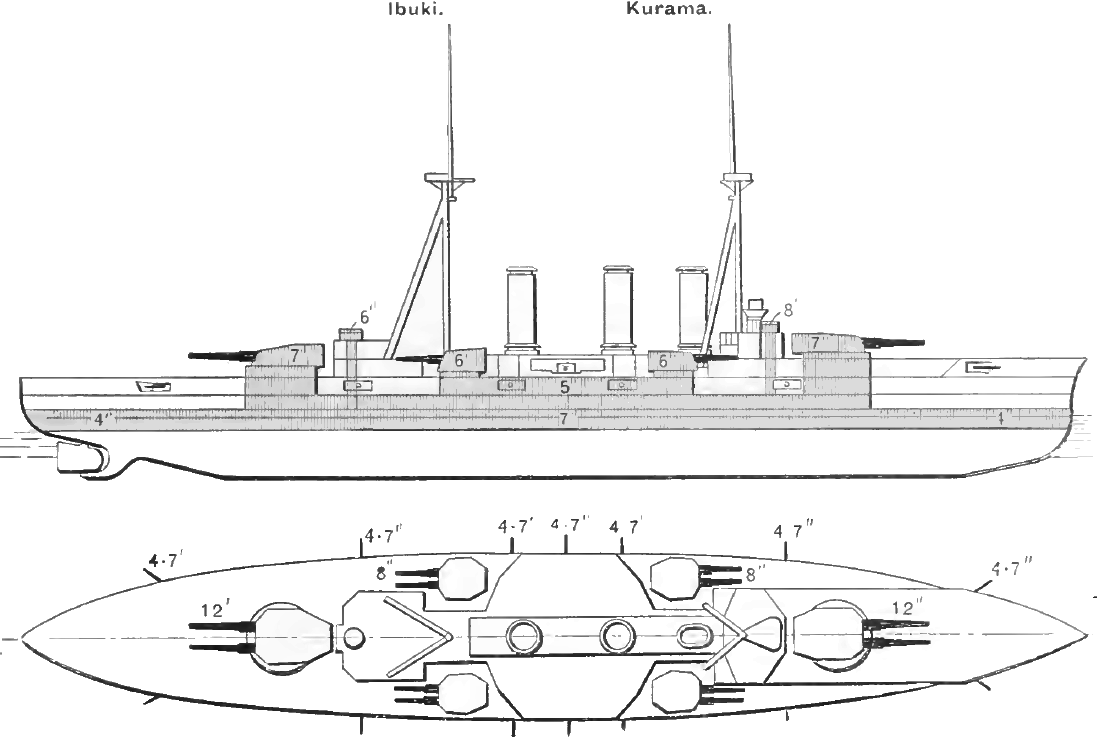
Right elevation and plan of the Ibuki-class cruisers from Brassey's Naval Annual 1915; the shaded areas represent armor.

The Ibuki-class ships were originally ordered during the Russo-Japanese War, on 31 January 1905, as Tsukuba-class armored cruisers. Before construction began, however, they were redesigned to incorporate 8-inch (203 mm) guns in four twin turrets rather than the dozen 6-inch (152 mm) guns in single mounts of the earlier ships. This required a larger hull to fit the turrets and thus more power from additional boilers to keep the same speed as the Tsukuba-class ships.

These ships were given battleship-grade armament to overpower existing armored cruisers and were intended to fight in the battleline with battleships, much as had the two Kasuga-class armored cruisers had done in the Battles of the Yellow Sea and Tsushima during the Russo-Japanese War. While more powerful than existing armored cruisers, the appearance of the British Invincible class in 1908 with their armament of eight 12-inch (305 mm) guns and speed of 25 knots (46 km/h; 29 mph) rendered these ships obsolete before they were commissioned. They were reclassified as battlecruisers in 1912.

The ships had an overall length of 485 feet (147.8 m) and a length between perpendiculars of 450 feet (137.2 m), a beam of 75 feet 6 inches (23.0 m), and a normal draught of 26 feet 1 inch (8.0 m). They displaced 14,636 long tons (14,871 t) at normal load and 15,595 long tons (15,845 t) at full load, roughly 900 long tons (910 t) more than the earlier ships. The crew numbered about 845 officers and enlisted men. They had a metacentric height of 2 feet 11.5 inches (0.902 m).

=== Propulsion ===
Both ships were intended to be powered by vertical triple-expansion steam engines, but the long construction delays suffered by Ibuki made it possible for her to serve as a test-bed for the steam turbine. Four sets of Curtis turbines were ordered from the Fore River Shipbuilding Co., two each for Ibuki and the battleship Aki. A month later, the Japanese paid $100,000 for a manufacturing license for the turbines.

Ibuki was equipped with two turbine sets, each driving one shaft, which developed a total of 24,000 shaft horsepower (18,000 kW), intended to give a maximum speed of 22.5 knots (41.7 km/h; 25.9 mph). They used steam provided by 18 mixed-firing, superheater-equipped Miyabara water-tube boilers, with a working pressure of 17 kg/cm^{2} (1,667 kPa; 242 psi), that sprayed fuel oil on the coal to increase its burn rate. Performance during Ibuki's initial sea trials on 12 August 1909 was unsatisfactory as she only reached 20.87 knots (38.65 km/h; 24.02 mph) despite the turbines exceeding their power rating with 27,353 shp (20,397 kW). The turbines were subsequently modified and the propellers were changed in an attempt to rectify the problem, but with only limited success. The ship ran her full-power trials again on 23 June 1910 and reached a speed of 21.16 knots (39.19 km/h; 24.35 mph) from 28,977 shp (21,608 kW).

Kurama used the traditional pair of four-cylinder reciprocating steam engines with a power rating of 22,500 indicated horsepower (16,800 kW), 2,000 indicated horsepower (1,500 kW) more than the older ships. She used the same type of boiler as Ibuki and derived the additional power from the addition of four boilers, for a total of 28, which required an additional funnel. The ships carried a maximum of 2,000 long tons (2,032 t) of coal and an additional 215 long tons (218 t) of fuel oil although their range is unknown.

=== Armament ===
The Ibuki-class armored cruisers were armed with four 45-caliber 12-inch 41st Year Type guns, mounted in twin-gun hydraulically powered centreline turrets. The guns had an elevation range of −3°/+23° and normally loaded their rounds at an angle of +5°, although loading at any angle up to +13° was theoretically possible. They fired 850-pound (386 kg) projectiles at a muzzle velocity of 2,800 ft/s (850 m/s); this provided a maximum range of 24,000 yd (22,000 m) with armour-piercing (AP) shells. The intermediate armament was much heavier than the older ships, with four twin-gun turrets equipped with 45-calibre 8-inch 41st Year Type guns mounted on each side. The guns could be elevated to +30° which gave them a maximum range of around 23,000 yards (21,000 m). Their 254-pound (115 kg) projectiles were fired at a muzzle velocity of 2,495 ft/s (760 m/s).

Defense against torpedo boats was mainly provided by fourteen 40-caliber 4.7-inch 41st Year Type quick-firing (QF) guns, all but two of which were mounted in casemates in the sides of the hull. The gun fired a 45-pound (20 kg) shell at a muzzle velocity of 2,150 ft/s (660 m/s). The ships were also equipped with four 40-caliber 12-pounder 12 cwt QF guns (Note: "Cwt" is the abbreviation for hundredweight, 12 cwt referring to the weight of the gun.) and four 23-caliber 12-pounder QF guns on high-angle mounts. Both of these guns fired 12.5-pound (5.67 kg) shells with muzzle velocities of 2,300 ft/s (700 m/s) and 1,500 feet per second (450 m/s) respectively. In addition, the cruisers were fitted with three submerged 18-inch (457 mm) torpedo tubes, one on each broadside and one in the stern. Each tube was provided with one training torpedo and two normal torpedoes.

=== Armor ===
Armor in the Ibuki class was improved compared to the earlier ships. The waterline armor belt of Krupp cemented armour was 7 inches (178 mm) thick between the 12-inch gun turrets although it was only 4 inches (102 mm) thick fore and aft of the turrets. Above it was a strake of 5-inch (127 mm) armor that extended between the eight-inch gun turrets and protected the two central 4.7-inch casemates. In front of those turrets, the armor was 6 inches (152 mm) thick. The ends of the main armor belt were connected to the main gun barbettes by 1-inch (25 mm) transverse bulkheads.

The primary gun turrets were protected by armor plates 9 inches (229 mm) thick and they had a 1.5-inch (38 mm) roof. The armour for the eight-inch turrets was six inches thick. The main barbettes were protected by seven inches of armour and the secondary barbettes by five inches, although the armor for those thinned to 2 inches (51 mm) behind the upper armor belt. The thickness of the armored decks was two inches throughout the ship. The sides of the forward conning tower were eight inches thick and its communications tube to the main deck was seven inches in thickness.

== Ships ==
Construction data
Ship	Namesake	Builder	Laid down	Launched	Completed	Fate
Ibuki	Mount Ibuki	Kure Naval Arsenal	22 May 1907	21 November 1907	1 November 1909	Scrapped, 1923
Kurama	Mount Kurama	Yokosuka Naval Arsenal	23 August 1905	21 October 1907	28 February 1911	Scrapped, 1923

== Construction and service ==
Construction of both ships was delayed by a lack of facilities at their shipyards, a shortage of appropriately trained workers and their low priority for building. Kurama's lengthy building time at Yokosuka Naval Arsenal was due to priority given to the building of the battleships Kawachi and Settsu and the repair and reconstruction of the ex-Russian ships captured after the Battle of Tsushima. Ibuki had to wait to have her keel laid until the slipway used by the battleship Aki became available after Aki was launched. Kure Naval Arsenal took advantage of the delay with Ibuki to stockpile material and components and set a record between keel-laying and launching of five months, a figure only bettered by Portsmouth Naval Dockyard when they built the battleship Dreadnought in only four months. The decision to switch from reciprocating engines to turbines in Ibuki and Aki was not made until five days after Ibuki's launching and thereafter she received priority over the battleship so that she was completed less than two years later, the first ship in the Imperial Japanese Navy to use steam turbines. In fact, construction on Aki was completely halted for about five months in favor of Ibuki because the former's turbines were late and the cruiser was better suited to serve as the testbed for the new technology.

Ibuki sailed to Thailand in 1911 to represent Japan during the coronation ceremony of King Rama VI Vajiravudh. When World War I began in August 1914, she was commanded by Captain Kanji Katō. The ship was ordered to Singapore and cooperated with the British to hunt down the light cruiser Emden in the East Indies and Indian Ocean. Ibuki was ordered to New Zealand to escort a large troop convoy of ANZAC troops to the Middle East in late September. She was ordered to guard the convoy, over Katō's protests, when the presence of the Emden was discovered in the Cocos Islands on 9 November. The Australian light cruiser HMAS Sydney was detached from the convoy to sink the Emden instead. With the ending of the threat to the convoy, Ibuki was transferred to the Second South Seas Squadron at Truk in the Caroline Islands. She was refitted at Kure in 1918, disarmed in 1922, and stricken from the Navy List the following year and scrapped in accordance with the Washington Naval Treaty. Her guns were turned over to the Imperial Japanese Army which emplaced one main-gun turret in the Tsugaru Strait between Honshu and Hokkaido and another in the Hōyo Strait in 1929.

Kurama attended the Coronation Fleet Review of King George V in Spithead on 24 June 1911. She was at Yokosuka in August 1914 and was assigned to the 1st South Seas Squadron to search for the East Asia Squadron. They departed there on 14 September and reached Truk on 11 October as troops carried by the squadron occupied the Carolines. The squadron was based in Suva, Fiji in November in case the East Asia Squadron decided to double back into the Central Pacific. Kurama was flagship of the 2nd Squadron in 1917 and was transferred to the 5th Squadron the following year. Like her sister, she was disarmed in 1922, stricken in 1923 and subsequently scrapped. Two of her 203 mm turrets were subsequently emplaced as coastal artillery around Tokyo Bay.
