= Japanese cruiser Ibuki (1907) =

1907 Ibuki-class battlecruiser

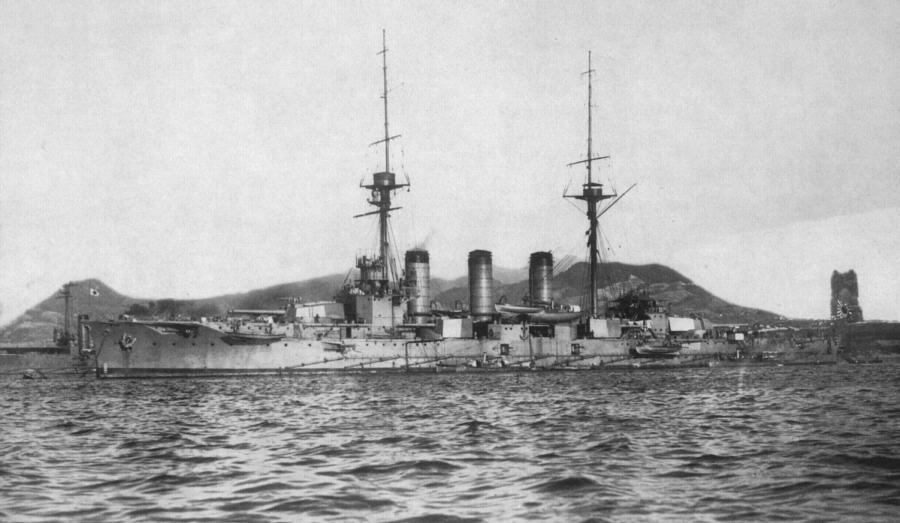
- Ibuki

History

Empire of Japan
- Name: Ibuki
- Namesake: Mount Ibuki
- Ordered: 1904 Fiscal Year
- Builder: Kure Naval Arsenal
- Laid down: 22 May 1907
- Launched: 21 October 1907
- Completed: 1 November 1909
- Commissioned: 1 December 1910
- Stricken: 20 September 1923
- Fate: Scrapped, 20 September 1923

General characteristics
- Class & type: Ibuki-class battlecruiser
- Displacement: 14,871 t (14,636 long tons) (standard); 15,845 t (15,595 long tons) (max)
- Length: 140 m (450 ft) p.p.; 148 m (485 ft) oa
- Beam: 23 m (75 ft 6 in)
- Draft: 8 m (26 ft 3 in)
- Installed power: 24,000 shp (18,000 kW)
- Propulsion: 2 × geared Curtis steam turbines; Mirabura boilers; 2 × shafts
- Speed: 21.5 kn (39.8 km/h; 24.7 mph)
- Range: 5,000 nmi (9,300 km; 5,800 mi) at 14 kn (26 km/h; 16 mph)
- Capacity: Coal: 610 t (600 long tons) (normal); 2,000 t (2,000 long tons) (maximum); Fuel Oil: roughly 250 t (250 long tons)
- Complement: 844
- Armament: 2 × twin 12-inch 41st Year Type guns; 4 × twin 8-inch (200 mm) 41st Year Type guns; 14 × single 4.7-inch (120 mm) 41st Year Type guns; 4 × 8 cm (3.1 in) guns; 3 × 45 cm (17.7 in) torpedo tubes
- Armor: Belt: Amidships: 10–18 cm (4–7 in); Ends: 10 cm (4 in); Barbettes: 18 cm (7 in); Turrets: Main: 18 cm (7 in); Secondary: 12.5 cm (5 in); Conning Tower: Forward: 20 cm (7.9 in); Aft: 15 cm (6 in); Deck: Main: 5.2 cm (2 in); Lower Deck Redoubt: 12.7 cm (5 in)
- Notes: Armor is Krupp steel.

Ibuki (伊吹) was the lead ship in the Ibuki class of armored cruisers in the Imperial Japanese Navy. Ibuki was named after Mount Ibuki, located between Gifu and Shiga prefectures in Honshū. On 28 August 1912, the Ibukis were re-classified as battlecruisers.

== Design and construction ==
Problems with her turbine engines delayed the construction of Ibuki, and construction began almost two years later than her sister ship, Kurama, which used standard reciprocating engines. Ibuki was built at Kure Naval Arsenal and was laid down on 22 May 1907, launched on 21 October 1907, and completed on 1 November 1909. The ship served as a reserve ship until her formal commissioning on 1 December 1910.

== Operational history ==
Shortly after she was commissioned, Ibuki was sent on a voyage to Thailand to attend the coronation ceremony of the Thai king Rama VI Vajiravudh. Ibuki served in World War I, participating in the hunt for the German light cruiser SMS Emden in 1914. She escorted a convoy of 10 troop transports carrying the main body of the New Zealand Expeditionary Force, crossing the Tasman Sea with the British protected cruiser HMS Pyramus and armoured cruiser HMS Minotaur to Albany, Western Australia in November 1914. Together with the Australian light cruiser HMAS Sydney, Ibuki escorted the Australian Imperial Force (AIF), consisting of 20,000 men and 7,500 horses, across the Indian Ocean.

At 8.55 the whole fleet moved ahead - thirty-six transports and three escorting cruisers. Two days later, the Ibuki with the great liners Ascanius and Medic carrying troops from South and Western Australia, was found waiting beside the route on the high seas, half-obscured by a rain squall. The two transports took up their places on the line. The Ibuki moved into the Melbourne's position on the starboard beam, while the Melbourne dropped immediately astern of the convoy. The whole fleet then headed for the Cocos Islands.

— C.E.W. Bean,

Ibuki was the only protection for the ANZACs when Sydney participated in the Battle of Cocos. The commander of Ibuki, Captain Kanji Katō had wanted the honor of engaging Emden, but despite being a superior ship to Sydney was ordered to stand down and stay with the convoy. This was later celebrated by the Royal Australian Navy as the "samurai spirit of the Ibuki" whenever Imperial Japanese ships visited Australia in subsequent years.

== Fate ==
After the war, Ibuki fell victim to the Washington Naval Treaty and was sold for scrap on 20 September 1923. Her guns were salvaged and used in shore batteries at Hakodate in Hokkaidō and along the Tsugaru Strait separating Honshū and Hokkaidō.
