= Japanese cruiser Kurama =

Japanese naval vessel

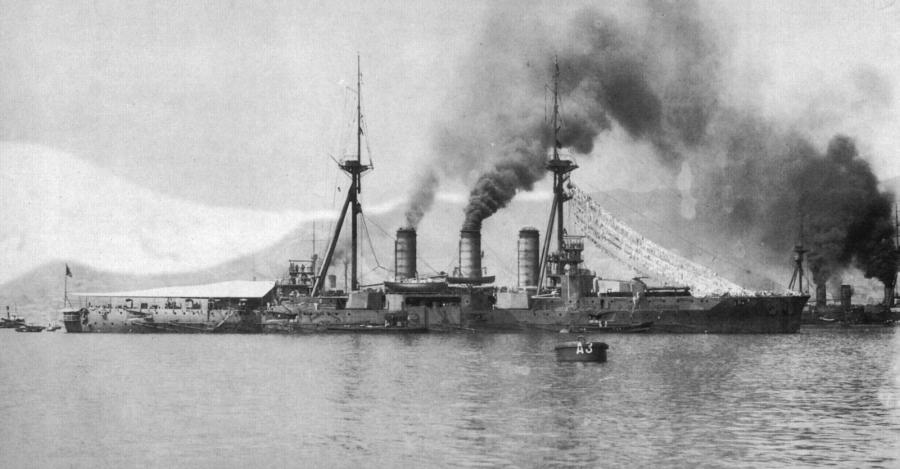
- Kurama

History

Empire of Japan
- Name: Kurama
- Ordered: 1904 Fiscal Year
- Builder: Yokosuka Naval Arsenal
- Laid down: 23 August 1905
- Launched: 21 October 1907
- Commissioned: 28 February 1911
- Stricken: 20 September 1923
- Fate: Scrapped, 20 September 1923

General characteristics
- Class & type: Ibuki-class battlecruiser
- Displacement: 14,636 t (14,405 long tons) (standard); 15,595 t (15,349 long tons) (max)
- Length: 147.8 m (484 ft 11 in)
- Beam: 23 m (75 ft 6 in)
- Draft: 8 m (26 ft 3 in)
- Installed power: 22,500 ihp (16,780 kW)
- Propulsion: 2 × vertical triple expansion reciprocating engines; 2 × screws
- Speed: 21.25 kn (39.36 km/h; 24.45 mph)
- Range: 5,000 nmi (9,000 km; 6,000 mi) at 14 kn (26 km/h; 16 mph)
- Complement: 844
- Armament: 2 × twin 12-inch 41st Year Type guns; 4 × twin 8-inch (200 mm) 41st Year Type guns; 14 × single 4.7-inch (120 mm) 41st Year Type guns; 4 × 8 cm (3.1 in) guns; 3 × 450 mm (18 in) torpedo tubes
- Armor: Belt: 100–180 mm (3.9–7.1 in); Barbette and Turret: 125–180 mm (4.9–7.1 in); Conning Tower: 200 mm (7.9 in); Deck: 75 mm (3.0 in)

Kurama (鞍馬) was the final vessel of the two-ship Ibuki class of armored cruisers in the Imperial Japanese Navy. Kurama was named after Mount Kurama located in Kyoto, Japan. On 28 August 1912, the Ibukis were re-classified as battlecruisers.

== Background ==
Ibuki was designed with geared steam turbines which promised more power and hence, more speed; however, problems with these engines led Kurama to be completed with conventional vertical triple expansion reciprocating engines. Kurama was built at Yokosuka Naval Arsenal.

== Service history ==
Shortly after commissioning, Kurama, with Admiral Hayao Shimamura on board, was sent on a voyage to Great Britain to attend the Coronation Fleet Review for King George V at Spithead on 25 June 1911.

Kurama served in World War I as part of Japan's contribution to the Allied war effort, protecting British merchant shipping in the South Pacific, and (together with the battlecruisers Kongō and Hiei) supporting the landings to occupy German-held Caroline Islands and Mariana Islands. In the 1920s, she was assigned to the northern fleet, covering the landings of Japanese troops in Russia during the Siberian Intervention in support of White Russian forces.

After the war, Kurama fell victim to the Washington Naval Treaty and was scrapped.
