= Ibuki (name) =

Ibuki (written: 伊吹) is a Japanese surname. Notable people with the surname include:

- Bunmei Ibuki (伊吹 文明; born 1938), Japanese politician
- Goro Ibuki (伊吹 吾郎; born 1946), Japanese actor

Fictional characters:

- Fūko Ibuki (伊吹 風子), from the anime series Clannad
- Kōko Ibuki (伊吹 公子), from Clannad
- Maya Ibuki (伊吹 マヤ) from the anime Neon Genesis Evangelion
- Suika Ibuki (伊吹 萃香), from Touhou Project
- Ukyo Ibuki (雪吹 右京), from the anime Beyblade Burst.
- Taki Ibuki (滝 維吹), from Ensemble Stars!.
- Mio Ibuki (伊吹 澪), from the light novel series Classroom of the Elite.
- Munemasa Ibuki (井吹 宗正), from Inazuma Eleven GO: Galaxy.

Ibuki (written: 息吹, 衣吹 or 歩紀) is also a unisex Japanese given name. Notable people with the name include:

- Ibuki Fujita (藤田 息吹; born 1991), Japanese footballer
- Ibuki Hara (原 衣吹; born 1998), Japanese footballer
- Ibuki Kido (木戸 衣吹; born 1997), Japanese voice actress
- Ibuki Koizumi (小泉 維吹; born 1996), Japanese sailor
- Ibuki Matsumoto (松本伊吹), Japanese snowboarder
- Ibuki Takahashi (高橋 いぶき; born 1997), Japanese weightlifter
- Ibuki Yoshida (吉田 伊吹; born 1997), Japanese footballer

Fictional characters:

- Ikaruga Ibuki (斑鳩 いぶき), a fictional character from Asu no Yoichi!
- Ibuki Mioda (澪田 唯吹), a character from Danganronpa 2: Goodbye Despair
- Ibuki (いぶき/息吹), a character from Street Fighter
- Ibuki (イブキ), a character from Beastars
- Ibuki (イブキ), from Kamen Rider Hibiki
- Ibuki Mitsuishi (光石イブキ), from Ultraman Teo
- Ibuki Niijima (新島衣舞紀), a character from the anime and game D4DJ.
