= Japanese battleship Kawachi =

Kawachi-class dreadnought battleship

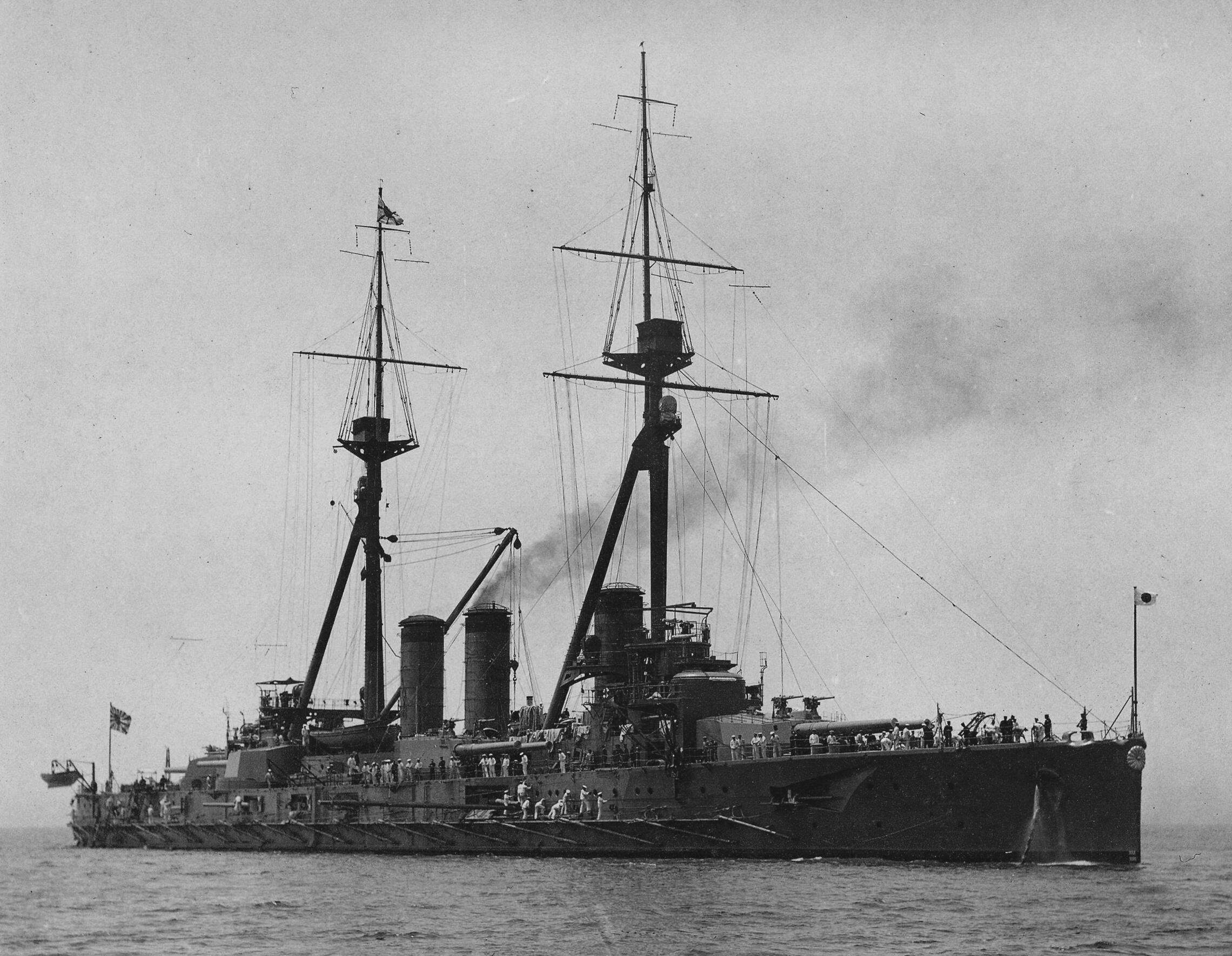
- Kawachi at anchor

History

Japan
- Name: Kawachi
- Namesake: Kawachi Province
- Ordered: 22 June 1907
- Builder: Yokosuka Naval Arsenal
- Laid down: 1 April 1909
- Launched: 15 October 1910
- Commissioned: 31 March 1912
- Stricken: 21 September 1918
- Fate: Sunk by magazine explosion, 12 July 1918 (34.00°N 131.60°E)

General characteristics
- Class & type: Kawachi-class battleship
- Displacement: 21,833 long tons (22,183 t) (normal)
- Length: 526 feet (160.32 m) (o/a)
- Beam: 84 feet 2 inches (25.65 m)
- Draft: 27 feet 8 inches (8.43 m)
- Installed power: 16 Miyabara water-tube boilers; 25,000 shp (19,000 kW)
- Propulsion: 2 shafts, 2 steam turbine sets
- Speed: 21 knots (39 km/h; 24 mph)
- Range: 2,700 nmi (5,000 km; 3,100 mi) at 18 knots (33 km/h; 21 mph)
- Complement: 999
- Armament: 2 × twin 12 in (305 mm)/50 guns; 4 × twin 12 in/45 guns; 10 × single 6 in (152 mm) guns; 8 × single 4.7 in (120 mm) guns; 12 × single 12 pdr (3 in (76 mm)) guns; 5 × 18 in (457 mm) torpedo tubes
- Armor: Waterline belt: 5–12 in (127–305 mm); Deck: 1.1 in (29 mm); Gun turrets: 11 in (279 mm); Conning tower: 6–10 in (152–254 mm); Barbettes: 9–11 in (229–279 mm)

Kawachi (Japanese: 河内; named after Kawachi Province) was the lead ship of her class of two Kawachi-class dreadnought battleships built for the Imperial Japanese Navy (IJN) in the 1910s. Completed in 1912, she often served as a flagship. Her only combat action during World War I was when she bombarded German fortifications in China during the Battle of Tsingtao in 1914. She sank in 1918 after an explosion in her ammunition magazine with the loss of over 600 officers and crewmen.

== Background ==
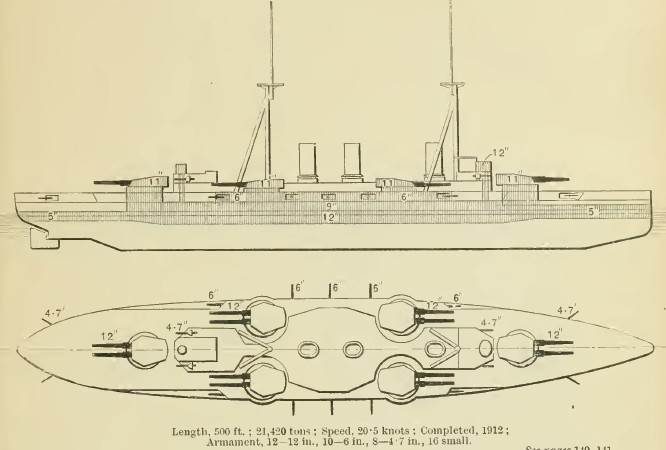
Right elevation and plan of the Kawachi-class battleships from Brassey's Naval Annual 1915

The Kawachi class were Japan's first true dreadnoughts. They were ordered on 22 June 1907 under the 1907 Warship Supplement Program after the Russo-Japanese War of 1904–1905, although their construction was delayed by a severe depression. Their design was based on the semi-dreadnought Aki with a uniform 12-inch (305 mm) main battery.

== Design and description ==
Kawachi had an overall length of 526 feet (160.32 m), a beam of 84 feet 2 inches (25.65 m), and a normal draft of 27 feet 8 inches (8.43 m). She displaced 21,833 long tons (22,183 t) at normal load and had a metacentric height of 5.2 feet (1.59 m). Her crew numbered 999 officers and enlisted men as completed.

The Kawachi-class ships were fitted with a pair of license-built Curtis steam turbine sets, each set driving one propeller, using steam from 16 Miyabara water-tube boilers. The turbines were rated at a total of 25,000 shaft horsepower (19,000 kW) for a design speed of 21 knots (39 km/h; 24 mph). They carried enough coal and fuel oil to give them a range of 2,700 nautical miles (5,000 km; 3,100 mi) at a speed of 18 knots (33 km/h; 21 mph).

The main armament of the Kawachi class consisted of four 50-caliber 12-inch 41st Year Type guns in two twin-gun turrets, one each fore and aft of the superstructure, and eight 45-caliber 12-inch 41st Year Type guns mounted in four twin-gun turrets, two on each side of the superstructure. Their secondary armament comprised ten 45-caliber 6-inch (152 mm) 41st Year Type guns, mounted in casemates in the sides of the hull. Eight 40-caliber quick-firing (QF) 4.7-inch (120 mm) 41st Year Type guns and a dozen 40-caliber QF 12-pounder 3-inch (76 mm) 41st Year Type guns provided defense against torpedo boats. Four other 12-pounder guns were used as saluting guns. In addition, the battleships were fitted with five submerged 18-inch (457 mm) torpedo tubes, two on each broadside and one in the stern.

The waterline main belt of the Kawachi-class ships had a maximum thickness of 12 inches amidships and tapered to a thickness of 5 inches (127 mm) at the ends of the ship. Above the belt, a 6-inch strake of armor protected the casemates. The barbettes for the main guns were 9–11 inches (229–279 mm) thick. Eleven-inch armor plates protected the front and sides of the Kawachis' main-gun turrets. The deck armor was 1.1 inches (29 mm) thick and the conning tower was protected by 6 to 10 inches (254 mm) of armor.

== Construction and career ==
Kawachi was laid down on Slipway No. 2 at Yokosuka Naval Arsenal on 1 April 1909. Following the Japanese ship-naming conventions, Kawachi was named after Kawachi Province, now a part of Osaka Prefecture. She was launched on 15 October 1910 in a ceremony attended by Emperor Meiji and completed on 31 March 1912 at a cost of ¥11,130,000. The following day she was assigned to the First Fleet and became the flagship of Vice Admiral Dewa Shigetō. On 3 October, the ship was present when the battleship Mikasa had a fire that was started by a sailor in the forward magazine. It was flooded before the fire could get out of control and Kawachi sent over fire-fighting teams to assist Mikasa's crew in case they were needed. The ship cruised in the South China Sea in February 1913 and then off the north China coast in April; she became a private ship on 1 December. When World War I began in August 1914, Kawachi was at Yokosuka.

Together with her sister ship, Settsu, she bombarded German fortifications in October–November 1914 during the final stage of the Battle of Tsingtao. The ship was present in Yokosuka on 8 January 1915 when the victorious Second Squadron returned to Japan after the Battle of Tsingtao. She was assigned to the First Squadron of the First Fleet on 15 August. On 1 December 1916 she began a lengthy refit.

Under the command of the newly appointed Captain Masaki Yoshimoto, Kawachi was assigned to the Second Squadron of the First Fleet on 1 December 1917 and became the flagship of Rear Admiral Chisaka Chijirō. She briefly cruised off the coast of China in February–March 1918. In May the ship exchanged two of her three-inch casemate guns for three-inch anti-aircraft guns. On the evening of 11 July, Kawachi entered Tokuyama Bay, the following morning torpedo target practice was cancelled due to rough seas and the battleship remained at anchor for the rest of the day. That afternoon a loud explosion was heard at 15:51 in the vicinity of the starboard forward main-gun turret and large quantities of smoke erupted from the turret and between the first and second funnels. Two minutes later, she began to list to starboard and capsized at 15:55, only four minutes after the explosion. Over a thousand men were aboard Kawachi at the time of the explosion and over 600 were killed, with 433 survivors. (Note: Sources differ widely on the exact number of men killed. Gardiner & Gray and Jentschura, Jung & Mickel agree on 700, but Lengerer & Ahlberg and Kingsepp give 618 killed from a crew of 960.)

The Imperial Japanese Navy convened a commission to investigate the explosion the day after the incident, with Vice Admiral Murakami Kakuichi as chairman. The commission first suspected arson, but no plausible suspect could be found and it reported that the cordite in her magazine might have spontaneously ignited due to decomposition. Kawachi's magazines had been inspected in January–February, however, and no problems were discovered, which made that possibility less likely. The commission made recommendations on tighter control of production and handling of cordite that were adopted by the navy. The Japanese Navy considered salvaging Kawachi, but decided not to do so as the diversion of resources would have delayed the construction of an Amagi-class battlecruiser by over a year. Stricken from the navy list on 21 September 1918, the wreck was later partially dismantled although most of the hull was abandoned in place to serve as an artificial reef.
