= Kawachi-class battleship =

Class of Japanese battleships

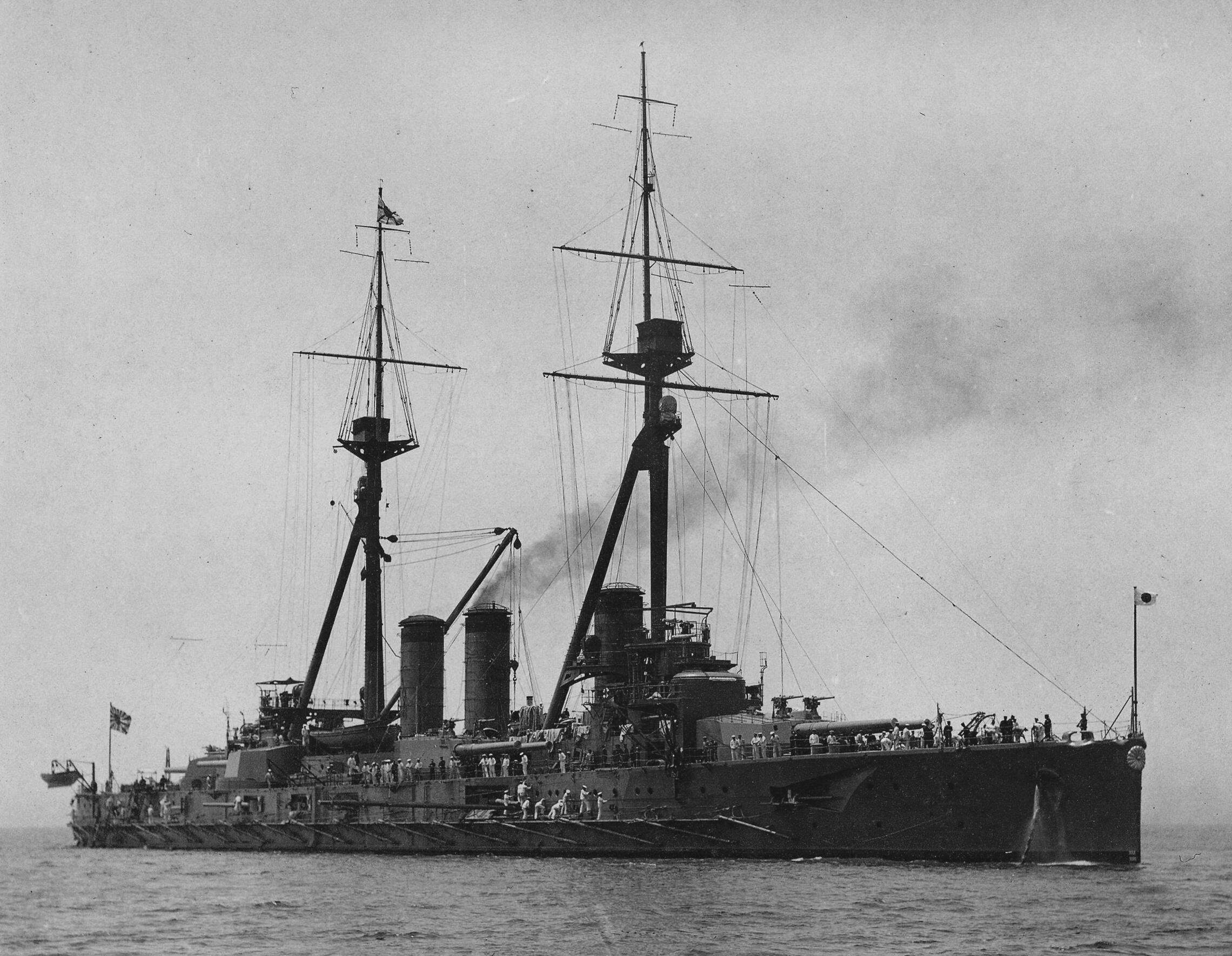
- Kawachi at anchor

Class overview
- Name: Kawachi class
- Builders: Yokosuka Naval Arsenal; Kure Naval Arsenal
- Operators: Imperial Japanese Navy
- Preceded by: Satsuma class
- Succeeded by: Fusō class
- Built: 1909–1912
- In service: 1912–1945
- In commission: 1912–1923
- Completed: 2
- Lost: 1
- Scrapped: 1

General characteristics
- Type: Dreadnought battleship
- Displacement: 20,823–21,443 long tons (21,157–21,787 t) (normal)
- Length: 526–533 ft (160.3–162.5 m)
- Beam: 84 ft 3 in (25.7 m)
- Draft: 27–27.8 ft (8.2–8.5 m)
- Installed power: 16 Miyabara water-tube boilers; 25,000 shp (19,000 kW)
- Propulsion: 2 shafts, 2 steam turbine sets
- Speed: 21 knots (39 km/h; 24 mph)
- Range: 2,700 nmi (5,000 km; 3,110 mi) at 18 knots (33 km/h; 21 mph)
- Complement: 999–1100
- Armament: 2 × twin 12 in (305 mm) guns; 4 × twin 12 in (305 mm) guns; 10 × single 6 in (152 mm) guns; 8 × single 4.7 in (120 mm) guns; 8 × single 12 pdr (3 in (76 mm)) guns; 5 × 18 in (457 mm) torpedo tubes
- Armor: Waterline belt: 5–12 in (127–305 mm); Deck: 1.2 in (30 mm); Gun turrets: 11 in (279 mm); Conning tower: 10 in (254 mm); Barbettes: 11 in (279 mm)

The Kawachi class (河内型戦艦, Kawachi-gata senkan) was a two-ship class of dreadnought battleships built for the Imperial Japanese Navy (IJN) in the first decade of the 20th century. Both ships bombarded German fortifications at Qingdao during the siege of Qingdao in 1914, but saw no other combat in World War I. Kawachi sank in 1918 after an explosion in her ammunition magazine with the loss of over 600 officers and crewmen. Settsu was disarmed in 1922 and converted into a target ship two years later to meet the terms of the Washington Naval Treaty and served until she was sunk in 1945 by American carrier aircraft. The ship was refloated after the war and scrapped in 1946–1947.

== Background ==
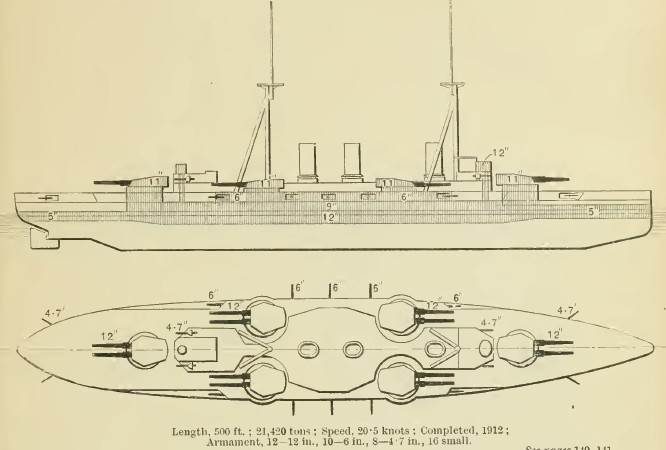
Right elevation and plan of the Kawachi-class battleships from Brassey's Naval Annual 1915

The Kawachi class was ordered on 22 June 1907 under the 1907 Warship Supplement Program after the Russo-Japanese War as Japan's first dreadnoughts, although their construction was delayed by a severe depression. They were one of the first steps in the fulfillment of the recently adopted Eight-Eight Fleet Program that required a fleet of eight dreadnoughts and armored cruisers. Their design was based on the Aki with a uniform 12-inch (305 mm) main-gun armament in the hexagonal layout used by the German dreadnoughts of the Nassau and Helgoland classes.

The first iteration of the design had six twin-gun turrets, with two pairs of superfiring turrets fore and aft of the superstructure and the two other turrets amidships "en echelon" to maximize end-on fire. This layout was rejected as it exceeded the informal 20,000 long tons (20,321 t) limit. The design was then revised with the turrets in the hexagonal layout using the same 45-caliber 12-inch guns used in the preceding battleships. In early 1908, the IJN received reports that the Royal Navy's latest battleships used longer 50-caliber guns. The Chief of the Naval General Staff, Admiral Tōgō Heihachirō, pushed to use these guns; cost considerations prevented all the guns from having the same barrel length, so they were used only in the fore and aft turrets.

== Description ==
The two ships had different bow designs for comparison purposes; Settsu's clipper bow was longer than Kawachi's vertical stem. Otherwise the two ships were externally virtually identical. The ships had an overall length of 526–533 feet (160.3–162.5 m), a beam of 84 feet 3 inches (25.7 m), and a normal draft of 27–27.8 feet (8.2–8.5 m). They displaced 20,823–21,443 long tons (21,157–21,787 t) at normal load and had a metacentric height of 5 feet 3 inches (1.59 m). Their crew ranged from 999 to 1100 officers and enlisted men.

The Kawachi-class vessels were fitted with a pair of license-built Curtis steam turbine sets, each set driving one propeller, using steam from 16 Miyabara water-tube boilers with a working pressure of 17.5 bar (1,750 kPa; 254 psi). The turbines were rated at a total of 25,000 shaft horsepower (19,000 kW) for a design speed of 21 knots (39 km/h; 24 mph). During testing, the turbines of both ships proved to be significantly more powerful than designed, 30,399 shp (22,669 kW) for Kawachi and 32,200 shp (24,000 kW) for Settsu, although the speeds attained on sea trials are unknown. The ships carried a maximum of 2,300 long tons (2,300 t) of coal and 400 long tons (410 t) of fuel oil which gave them a range of 2,700 nautical miles (5,000 km; 3,100 mi) at a speed of 18 knots (33 km/h; 21 mph).

=== Armament ===
The Kawachi class carried four 50-caliber Type 41 12-inch guns mounted in two twin-gun turrets, one each fore and aft of the superstructure. Settsu's guns were ordered from Vickers and Kawachi's were built in Japan. The fore and aft turrets could each traverse 270°. They fired 850-pound (386 kg) armor-piercing (AP) shells at a muzzle velocity of 3,000 ft/s (910 m/s); this gave a maximum range of 24,000 yards (22,000 m). The eight 45-caliber 12-inch 41st Year Type were mounted in four twin-gun wing turrets, two on each broadside. Each turret could traverse 160°. The 45-caliber guns fired the same shell as the longer guns, although muzzle velocity was reduced to 2,800 ft/s (850 m/s) and range to 21,872 yards (20,000 m). Each 12-inch gun was provided with 80 rounds, normally loaded at an elevation of +5°, although they could be loaded at any angle up to +13°. The guns had an elevation range of -5° to +25°.

Their secondary armament consisted of ten 45-caliber 6-inch (152 mm) guns, mounted in casemates in the sides of the hull, and eight 40-caliber quick-firing (QF) 4.7-inch (120 mm) 41st Year Type guns. The 6-inch (152 mm) gun fired a 100-pound (45 kg) AP shell at a muzzle velocity of 2,706 ft/s (825 m/s) and the ships carried 150 rounds for each gun. The shell of the 4.7-inch gun weighed 45 pounds (20.4 kg) and was fired at a muzzle velocity of 2,150 ft/s (660 m/s). Each gun was also provided with 150 rounds.

The ships were also equipped with a dozen 40-caliber QF 12-pounder (3-inch (76 mm)) 41st Year Type guns for defense against torpedo boats (Note: These guns were mounted on the main gun turrets' roofs for use only at night and were manned by the gun crews from the turrets; they were dismounted and stowed inside the ship during daylight.) and four shorter 12-pounder guns were used as saluting guns or mounted on the ships' boats. Both of these guns fired 12.5-pound (5.67 kg) shells with muzzle velocities of 2,300 ft/s (700 m/s) and 1,500 feet per second (450 m/s) respectively. They carried a total of 1,200 rounds for the longer guns and another 1,200 for the shorter guns.

In addition, they were fitted with five submerged 18-inch (457 mm) torpedo tubes, two on each broadside and one in the stern. Two of the ships' boats could carry torpedoes and the ships carried a total of 24 Type 43 torpedoes. These had a 209-pound (95 kg) warhead and a maximum range of 5,500 yards (5,000 m) at a speed of 26 knots (48 km/h; 30 mph).

=== Armor ===
The waterline main belt of the Kawachi-class ships consisted of Krupp cemented armor that had a maximum thickness of 12 inches amidships and tapered to a thickness of 5 inches (127 mm) inches at the ends of the ship. Approximately 6 feet 4 inches (1.93 m) of the belt was above the waterline and 6 feet 5 inches (1.95 m) below it. Above the belt was a strake of armor 8 inches (203 mm) thick that covered the side of the hull up to the height of the middle deck. Above that was a 6-inch strake that protected the casemates. The barbettes for the main guns were 11 inches (280 mm) thick above the weather deck and 9 inches (229 mm) below it. The armor of all the 12-inch gun turrets had a maximum thickness of 11 inches with a 3-inch roof. The deck armor was 1.1 inches (29 mm) thick and the conning tower was protected by 10 inches (254 mm) of armor.

== Ships ==
Construction data
Ship	Builder	Laid down	Launched	Completed
Kawachi	Yokosuka Naval Arsenal	1 April 1909	15 October 1910	31 March 1912
Settsu	Kure Naval Arsenal	18 January 1909	30 March 1911	1 July 1912

== Service ==
Following the Japanese ship-naming conventions, Kawachi and Settsu were named after ancient Japanese provinces, both now a part of Osaka Prefecture. The only significant action performed by either ship during World War I was when they bombarded German fortifications in October–November 1914 during the final stage of the Battle of Qingdao. They were both assigned to the First Squadron until they were refitted in 1917 and 1916 respectively. Upon their completion of their refits, both ships were assigned to the Second Squadron. On 12 July 1918, Kawachi was sunk in an accidental magazine explosion in Tokuyama Bay that killed over 600 crewmen. (Note: Sources differ widely on the exact number of men killed. Gardiner and Gray and Jentschura, Jung and Mickel agree on 700, but Lengerer says 600 and Kingsepp gives 618 killed from a crew of 960.) Stricken from the Navy List on 21 September 1918, the wreck was later partially dismantled although most of the hull was abandoned in place to serve as an artificial reef.

Settsu was reassigned to the First Squadron later that month. By this time, the dozen 40-caliber 3-inch 4th Year Type guns had been removed and four 3-inch anti-aircraft guns were added. Two of the torpedo tubes were also removed. The ship served as the flagship for Emperor Taishō for the naval reviews held in 1918 and 1919. She was placed in reserve in late 1919 and reboilered during an overhaul that lasted until 1921. Settsu was disarmed in 1922 under the terms of the Washington Naval Treaty (Note: Originally Japan was going to be able to retain Settsu intact, but she was given up so that the IJN could keep the brand-new battleship Mutsu.) and stricken from the Navy List on 1 October 1923. Her guns were turned over to the Imperial Japanese Army for use as coastal artillery; her main gun turrets were installed around the Strait of Tsushima. The rest of her guns were placed in reserve and scrapped in 1943. The ship was converted into a target ship in 1924 with her armor reinforced to withstand hits.

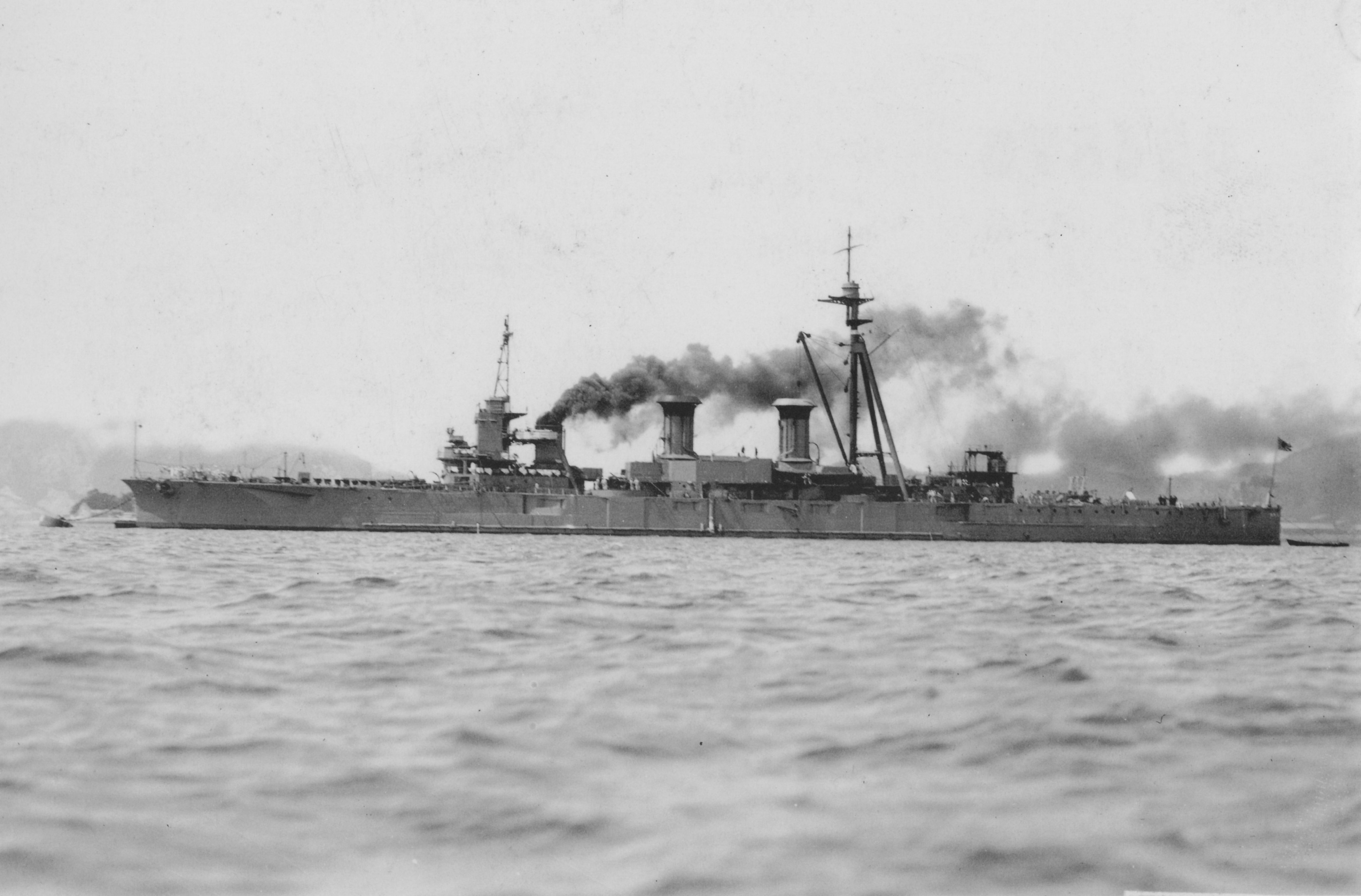
Settsu at anchor on 7 April 1940

In 1935–1937, the ship was converted to radio-control which allowed her to be maneuvered by operators aboard another ship and additional armor was added. At the beginning of the Second Sino-Japanese War in 1937, she transported a battalion of naval troops to the Shanghai area. Settsu simulated the radio traffic of eight aircraft carriers at the beginning of the Pacific War in an effort to deceive Allied intelligence as to the locations and activities of the Japanese carriers. For the rest of the war she served as a target for carrier pilots. Settsu was badly damaged when Allied carrier aircraft attacked the IJN base at Kure in July 1945 and was forced to beach herself lest she sink. The ship was stricken from the Navy List on 20 November and her hulk was raised and broken up in 1946–1947.
