= Ibuki Hara =

Japanese footballer

Personal information
- Date of birth: 30 June 1998 (age 28)
- Place of birth: Kanagawa Prefecture, Japan
- Height: 1.57 m (5 ft 2 in)
- Position: Midfielder

Team information
- Current team: MyNavi Sendai
- Number: 6

Senior career*
Years	Team	Apps	(Gls)
2017-2020	Tokyo Verdy Beleza	9	(0)
2021-	MyNavi Sendai	13	(0)
- * Club domestic league appearances and goals

Ibuki Hara (born 30 June 1998) is a Japanese professional footballer who plays as a midfielder for WE League club MyNavi Sendai.

== Club career ==
Hara made her WE League debut on 2 October 2021.
