= Kasuga-class cruiser =

1902 class of Japanese armored cruisers

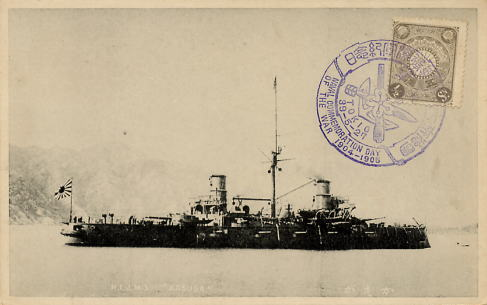
- Kasuga in 1900

Class overview
- Name: Kasuga class
- Builders: Gio. Ansaldo & C., Genoa, Italy
- Operators: Imperial Japanese Navy
- Preceded by: Azuma
- Succeeded by: Tsukuba class
- Built: 1902–1904
- In commission: 1904–1945
- Completed: 2
- Lost: 2

General characteristics
- Type: Armored cruiser
- Displacement: 7,628 long tons (7,750 t) Kasuga; 7,698 long tons (7,822 t) Nisshin
- Length: 108.8 m (356 ft 11 in) w/l; 111.73 m (366 ft 7 in) o/a
- Beam: 18.9 m (62 ft 0 in)
- Draught: 7.32 m (24 ft 0 in)
- Propulsion: 2 shaft Reciprocating Vertical Triple Expansion (VTE) Engines; 8 boilers; 13,500 shp (10,100 kW)
- Speed: 20 knots (23 mph; 37 km/h)
- Range: 7,000 nmi (13,000 km) at 10 kn (12 mph; 19 km/h)
- Complement: 600
- Armament: 1 × BL 10 inch gun Mk I – IV (Kasuga only); 4 × 20.3 cm/45 Type 41 naval guns (2 in Kasuga); 14 × 6-inch (152 mm) rapid fire guns; 10 × 3-inch (76.2 mm) rapid fire guns; 6 × QF 3 pounder Hotchkiss guns; 2 × Maxim guns; 4 × 457 mm (18 in) torpedo tubes
- Armour: Main Belt: 70–150 mm (2.8–5.9 in); Deck: 25–38 mm (0.98–1.50 in); Barbette, Turret, Casemate & Conning tower: 100–150 mm (3.9–5.9 in)

The Kasuga-class cruiser (春日型巡洋艦, Kasuga-gata jun'yōkan) was a class of two armored cruisers of the Imperial Japanese Navy (IJN) based on the Giuseppe Garibaldi-class cruisers developed by Italy at the end of the 19th century.

== Background ==
The Italian Giuseppe Garibaldi-class design was a private venture by Gio. Ansaldo & C., which was hoping to profit from the need for the world's navies to modernize towards heavily armored steam warships. The design was so popular that between 1894 and 1902 ten cruisers were purchased by four countries: The first five by the Italian Navy, four by the Argentine Navy and one by the Spanish Navy.

There is a disagreement in sources as to who originally ordered these ships. Conway's All the World's Fighting Ships states that they were ordered by the Italian Navy, while naval historian Robert Scheina writes that it was actually Argentina. In any case, Argentina originally planned to name them Mitre and Roca, then Rivadavia and Mariano Moreno, before they sold them to the Imperial Japanese Navy before final completion in 1904, where they were renamed the Kasuga and Nisshin.

== Design ==
Designed by Edoardo Masdea, the Garibaldi-class cruiser was a hybrid between a cruiser and a battleship. At 20 knots (37 km/h) maximum speed, the design was slightly slower than contemporary cruisers, but was very heavily armed and also heavily armored, in a package with very low displacement and moderate dimensions.

The class was unusual in that they did not have a uniform main armament. Some had single 10-inch (254 mm) guns in gun turrets fore and aft; others (including the Kasuga) had a mixed armament of a single 10-inch (254 mm) gun in one turret and another turret with twin 8-inch (203 mm) guns. A third variation (including Nisshin) was a uniform armament of four 8-inch (203 mm) guns, twin gun turrets fore and aft.

== Ships in class ==
Name	Builder	Laid down	Launched	Completed	Fate
Kasuga	Gio. Ansaldo & C., Genoa	March 1902	22 October 1902	7 January 1904	Badly damaged by bombing at Yokosuka on 18 July 1945, and broken up there 1948
Nisshin	Gio. Ansaldo & C., Genoa	May 1902	9 February 1903	7 January 1904	Removed from effective List on 1 April 1935; expended as target 1936, then refloated and broken up

=== Kasuga ===
Kasuga was originally to be named Mitre but was renamed as Rivadavia by Argentina. She served in the Russo-Japanese War and took part in the Battle of the Yellow Sea and again at the Battle of Tsushima. After 1922, she was partially disarmed as part of the Washington Naval Treaty and used as a training ship. She was bombed and sunk by US Navy carrier aircraft at Yokosuka 18 July 1945, raised and scrapped in 1948.

=== Nisshin ===
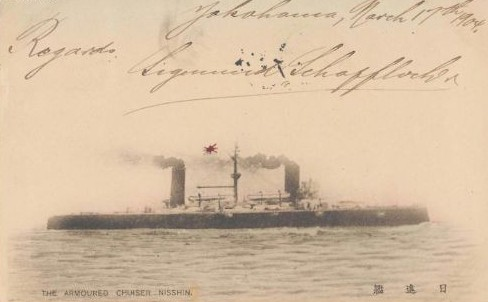
Nisshin in 1905

Nisshin was originally to be named Roca but was renamed as Mariano Moreno by Argentina. She served in the Russo-Japanese War and was severely damaged during the Battle of the Yellow Sea and again at the Battle of Tsushima. After 1922, as part of the Washington Naval Treaty she was partially disarmed and used as a training ship. Nisshin was finally expended as a target and sunk in 1936.

== Afterwards ==
The success of the Japanese Navy in using armored cruisers in the line of battle during the Russo-Japanese War of 1905 drew considerable attention from navies and ship designers worldwide. The armored cruiser design soon evolved into the dreadnought armored cruiser, which became known as the battlecruiser.
