= Katō Kanji =

Japanese naval officer (1870–1939)

Katō Kanji Senior Second Rank
- 加藤寛治
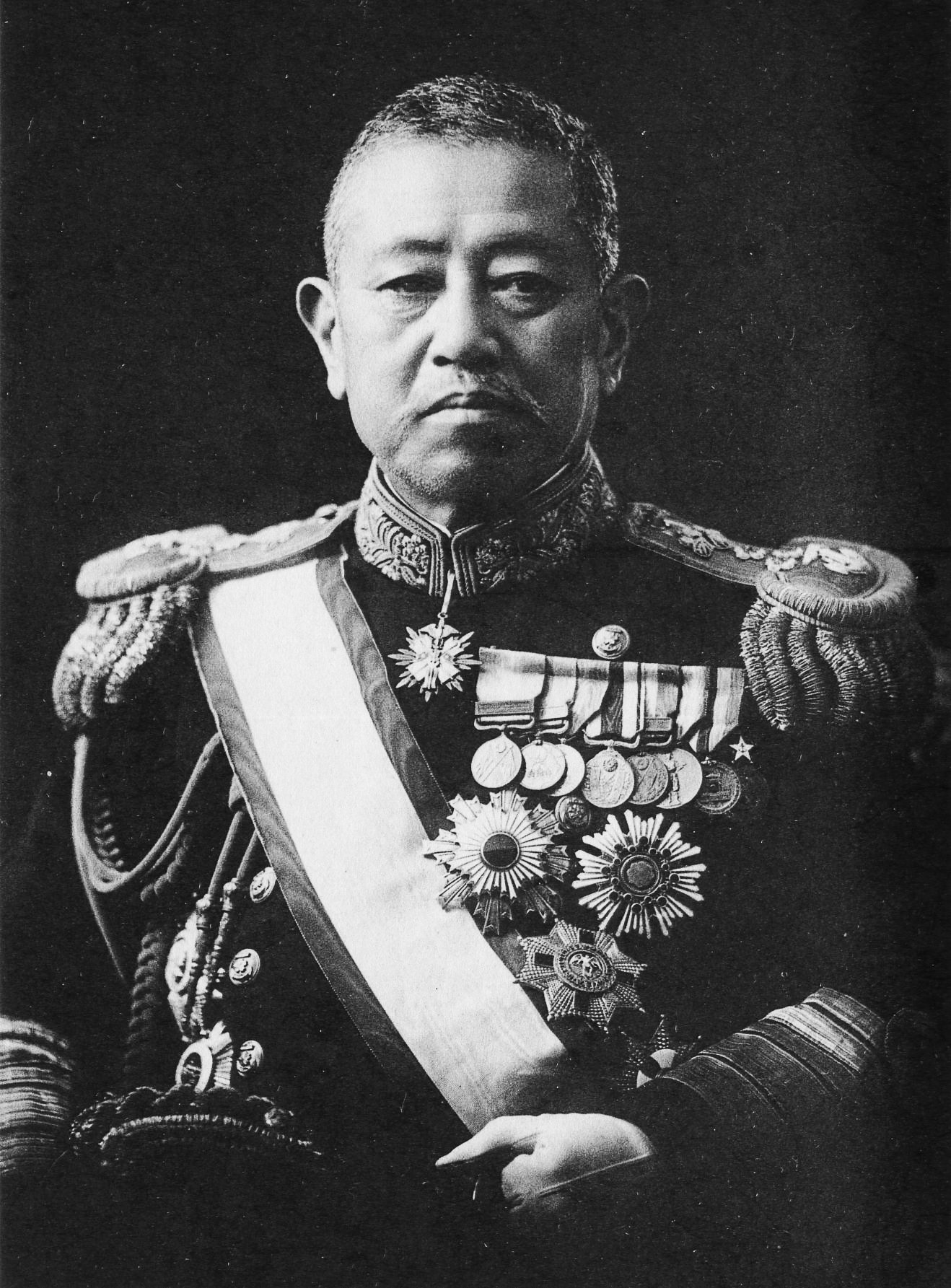
- Admiral Katō Kanji in 1935
- Born: 23 December 1870; Fukui, Echizen, Japan
- Died: 9 February 1939 (aged 68); Atami, Shizuoka, Japan
- Military career
- Allegiance: Empire of Japan
- Branch: Imperial Japanese Navy
- Service years: 1891–1935
- Rank: Admiral
- Commands: Tsukuba, Ibuki, Hiei, Naval Gunnery School, 5th Squadron, Naval War College, Vice-chief of Navy General Staff, 2nd Fleet, Yokosuka Naval District, Combined Fleet, 1st Fleet, Chief of Navy General Staff
- Conflicts: Russo-Japanese War; World War I
- Awards: Order of the Crown of Italy

Katō Hiroharu, alternatively named Katō Kanji (23 December 1870 – 9 February 1939), was a Japanese naval officer during the Russo-Japanese War and World War I. The given name reading 'Kanji' was used in his later life after he became famous, perhaps just before he was promoted to rear-admiral. (Note: This is a basic rule-of-thumb applicable to almost any Japanese names with both 'On' and 'Kun' spellings. Normally, the kun reading is the name used in the family, while the on reading is the nickname used with respect.) He served as the Chief of Navy General Staff from 22 January 1929 to 11 June 1930.

== Biography ==
Katō Hiroharu was born in Fukui City in Fukui on 2 November in the 3rd year of Meiji (23 December 1870) as the eldest son of one of the first navy officers, Katō Naokata, of Fukui Domain in Imperial Japan before the abolition of the han system. On 17 July 1891, he graduated top of the class from Imperial Japanese Naval Academy, 18th class. He was assigned to cruiser Naniwa as a cadet as of 20 May 1892 and experienced two tours to Kingdom of Hawaii. While at Honolulu on the second tour, he was promoted to ensign on 1 March 1894. He was assigned as a navigator on cruiser Hashidate. After returning to Yokosuka Naval Base, he completed the Gunnery training program on corvette Ryūjō on 1 March 1896, which later became the Gunnery School of Naval War College. At the same time, he was assigned as a navigator on cruiser Chiyoda.

In February 1896, he married Murata Chiyoko from the Fukui Domain, and on 24 October 1896, he was appointed as a member of the receiving commission sent to London for battleship Fuji. He was promoted to squad leader on Fuji, Chief Navigation Officer of IJN Tatsuta, and then assigned to Consulate General of Japan in Saint Petersburg.

He entered into the Russo-Japanese War in 1904 as the Chief Gunnery Officer of IJN Asahi and experimented with a salvo-firing central control of main guns during the Battle of the Yellow Sea on 10 August 1904, contributing to the killing of Admiral Wilgelm Vitgeft and his staff onboard Russian flagship Tsesarevich after the Japanese fleet flagship Mikasa handed over the leading battle position to Asahi. His primitive voice-command control system was adopted by the entire Combined Fleet, and he was promoted to the Chief Gunnery Officer of flagship Mikasa in March 1905.

He was a naval attaché at the Embassy of Japan in London in 1909. He had opposed the signing of the 1930 Treaty of London, which established limitations on arms between Japan, the United States and Great Britain. In 1930 he resigned rather than attend a dinner in honour of US Ambassador William Richards Castle Jr., in protest against the naval restrictions negotiated with him. Kato fought against the treaty limitations, and the treaty of 1936, finally dying after writing his memoirs, widely regarded as a treatise on why Japan was disadvantaged by the treaties. His actions prevented him from advancing in rank and probably cost him a seat in the government. He had an active antagonistic relationship with Yamamoto, who used his influence to prevent Kato from advancing.

== Imperial Japanese Court Ranks ==
- Eighth Rank (16 April 1894)
- Junior Sixth Rank (20 May 1903)
- Sixth Rank (30 November 1906)
- Fourth Rank (31 July 1923)
- Third Rank (16 September 1929)
- Junior Second Rank (1 October 1934)
- Second Rank (9 February 1939)

== Awards ==
- Order of the Rising Sun, 6th class with Silver Rays (18 November 1895)
- Order of the Sacred Treasure, 4th class, Gold Rays with Rosette (29 November 1904)
- Memory of the Prince's visit to Korea Medal (18 April 1909)
- Order of the Sacred Treasure, 2nd class, Gold and Silver Star (26 September 1918)
- Order of the Crown of Italy, Grand Officer (3 December 1920)
- Order of the Crown of Romania, Grand Officer (3 December 1920)
- Order of the Rising Sun, Grand Cordon with Golden Rays (28 December 1929)
- Set of Golden Cups with Chrysanthemum crest (4 November 1935)
- Légion d'honneur of French Third Republic, Grand-officier (20 August 1936)

== Bibliography ==
- Lawrence Sondhaus (2004). Navies in Modern World History. Reaktion Books. pp. 217–219. ISBN 978-1-86189-455-7.

Military offices
Preceded by Horiuchi Saburō	Tsukuba; Commanding Officer; 1 December 1913 – 6 May 1914	Succeeded by Takeuchi Jirō
Preceded by Takeuchi Jirō	Ibuki; Commanding Officer; 6 May 1914 – 1 February 1915	Succeeded by Kawahara Kesatarō
Preceded by Satō Tetsutarō	Naval War College; Headmaster; 10 August 1920 – 1 May 1922	Succeeded by Horinouchi Saburō
Preceded by Naoe Nakano	2nd Fleet; Commander-in-chief; 1 June 1923 – 1 December 1924	Succeeded by Saitō Hanroku
Preceded by Horinouchi Saburō	Yokosuka Naval District; Commander-in-chief; 1 December 1924 – 10 December 1926	Succeeded by Okada Keisuke
Preceded by Okada Keisuke	Combined Fleet & 1st Fleet; Commander-in-chief; 10 December 1926 – 10 December 1928	Succeeded by Taniguchi Naomi
Preceded by Suzuki Kantarō	Navy General Staff; Chairman; 22 January 1929 – 11 June 1930	Succeeded by Taniguchi Naomi
