= Tsukuba-class cruiser =

Japanese class of cruisers

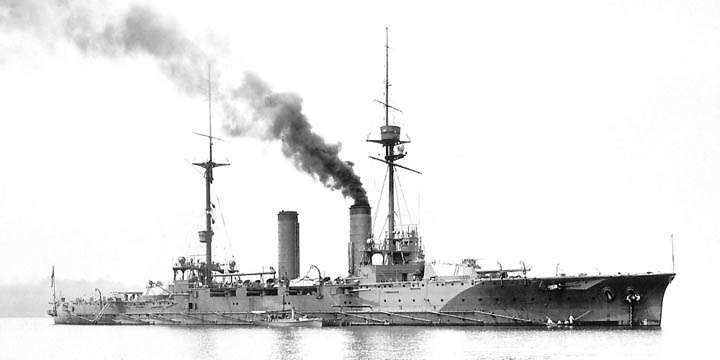
- Tsukuba at anchor at Kure, after 1913

Class overview
- Name: Tsukuba
- Builders: Kure Naval Arsenal
- Operators: Imperial Japanese Navy
- Preceded by: Kasuga class
- Succeeded by: Ibuki class
- Built: 1905–1908
- In service: 1907–1922
- Planned: 2
- Completed: 2
- Lost: 1
- Scrapped: 1

General characteristics
- Type: Armored cruiser (later reclassified as battlecruiser)
- Displacement: 13,750 long tons (13,971 t)
- Length: 450 ft (137.2 m)
- Beam: 75 ft (22.9 m)
- Draft: 26 ft (7.9 m)
- Installed power: 20 Miyabara water-tube boilers, 20,500 ihp (15,300 kW)
- Propulsion: 2 Shafts; 2 Vertical triple-expansion steam engines
- Speed: 20.5 knots (38.0 km/h; 23.6 mph)
- Complement: 820
- Armament: 2 × twin 12-inch (305 mm) guns; 12 × single 6-inch (152 mm) guns; 12 × single 4.7-inch (120 mm) guns; 4 × single QF 12-pounder 12-cwt guns; 4 × QF 3-pounder Hotchkiss; 3 × single torpedo tubes
- Armor: Waterline belt: 4–7 in (102–178 mm); Deck: 1.5–2 in (38–51 mm); Gun Turret: 6.0–9.6 in (152–244 mm); Barbette: 7 in (178 mm); Conning tower: 8 in (203 mm); Bulkhead: 1 in (25 mm)

The Tsukuba-class cruisers (筑波型 巡洋戦艦, Tsukuba-gata jun'yōsenkan) were a pair of large armored cruisers (Sōkō jun'yōkan) built for the Imperial Japanese Navy (IJN) in the first decade of the 20th century. Construction began during the Russo-Japanese War of 1904–05 and their design was influenced by the IJN's experiences during the war. The British development of the battlecruiser the year after Tsukuba was completed made her and her sister ship Ikoma obsolete, as they were slower and more weakly armed than the British, and later German, ships. Despite this, they were reclassified in 1912 as battlecruisers by the IJN.

Both ships played a small role in World War I as they unsuccessfully hunted for the German East Asia Squadron in late 1914. They became training ships later in the war. Tsukuba was destroyed in an accidental magazine explosion in 1917 and subsequently scrapped. Her sister was disarmed in 1922 in accordance with the terms of the Washington Naval Treaty and broken up for scrap in 1924.

== Background ==
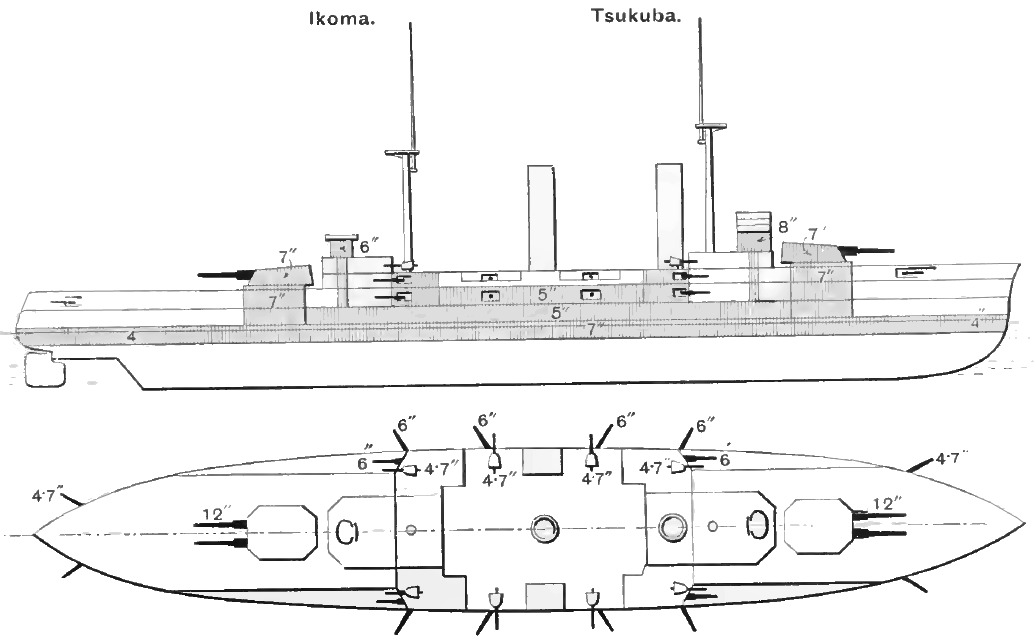
Right elevation and plan of the Tsukuba-class cruisers from Brassey's Naval Annual 1915; the shaded areas represent armor.

About a month after the Russo-Japanese War began in February 1904, the Japanese Diet authorized a temporary special budget of ¥48,465,631 that would last until the end of the war. It included the 1904 War Naval Supplementary Program which authorized construction of two battleships and four armored cruisers, among other ships. Two of the latter became the Tsukuba-class cruisers which were ordered on 23 June.

Based on the experience at the Battle of the Yellow Sea in August 1904 where the Russians opened fire at ranges well beyond what had been anticipated before the war, the IJN decided to arm the ships with 12-inch (305 mm) 45-calibre (45 feet long barrel) guns, which outranged the 12" 40-calibre guns used by the Japanese battleships in the war. The increase in armament was also justified by a change in the IJN's doctrine for these ships in which they were now intended to participate in the line of battle and overpower the enemy's screening armored cruisers. The Tsukubas were "briefly the world's most powerful cruisers in service until the completion of the first true battlecruisers, the British Invincible class". They were also the first capital ships to be designed and constructed entirely by Japan in a Japanese shipyard.

This type of warships with speed of a cruiser and the firepower and protection armor of a battleship was advocated by First Sea Lord Jacky Fisher who coined the term 'battlecruiser' for the type in the UK later in 1908.

== Design and description ==
The Tsukuba-class design was very similar to that of the British Cressy-class armored cruiser, albeit some 1,750 long tons (1,778 t) larger. The Japanese ships were shorter and beamier, but shape of the hull and the positioning of the armament was almost identical, although the traditional ram bow was replaced by a clipper-style bow. The adoption of more powerful Miyabara water-tube boilers by the IJN allowed the number of boilers to be reduced from 30 in the British ships to 20 in the Tsukuba-class ships with no loss of power or speed. This reduced the length required for their propulsion machinery and allowed the larger guns and their ammunition to be accommodated.

The Tsukubas had an overall length of 450 feet (137.2 m) and a length between perpendiculars of 440 feet (134.1 m), a beam of 75 feet (22.9 m), and a normal draft of about 26 feet (7.9 m). They displaced 13,750 long tons (13,971 t) at normal load and 15,400 long tons (15,647 t) at full load. They had a metacentric height of 4 feet 5 inches (1.34 m) which made them bad gun platforms as they had a very quick roll. The crew numbered about 820 officers and enlisted men.

The Tsukuba-class ships had two 4-cylinder vertical triple-expansion steam engines, each driving a single propeller shaft. Steam for the engines was provided by 20 Miyabara boilers with a working pressure of 16.8 kg/cm^{2} (1,648 kPa; 239 psi). The engines were rated at a total of 20,500 indicated horsepower (15,300 kW) to give a designed speed of 20.5 knots (38.0 km/h; 23.6 mph). During their sea trials the ships reached 20.4 to 21.6 knots (37.8 to 40.0 km/h; 23.5 to 24.9 mph) from 22,670–23,260 ihp (16,910–17,340 kW). The Tsukubas were first ships of the IJN to use fuel oil sprayed onto the coal for extra power and carried up to 1,911 long tons (1,942 t) of coal and 160 long tons (163 t) of oil.

=== Armament ===
The Tsukuba-class armored cruisers were armed with four 45-caliber 12-inch 41st Year Type guns. The guns were mounted in twin-gun hydraulically powered centerline turrets, one each fore and aft of the superstructure. The guns had an elevation range of −3° to +23° and normally loaded their rounds at an angle of +5°, although loading at any angle up to +13° was theoretically possible. They fired 850-pound (386 kg) projectiles at a muzzle velocity of 2,800 ft/s (850 m/s); this provided a maximum range of 24,000 yd (22,000 m) with armor-piercing (AP) shells. Their secondary armament consisted of a dozen Elswick Ordnance Company "Pattern GG" 45-caliber 6-inch (152 mm) guns mounted in armored casemates on the middle and main decks. The eight guns on the middle deck were very close to the waterline and could not be used in bad weather. Their 100-pound (45.4 kg) AP shells were fired at a muzzle velocity of 2,706 feet per second (825 m/s).

Close-range defense against torpedo boats consisted of twelve quick-firing (QF) 4.7-inch 41st Year Type guns. Four of these were mounted in casemates in the bow and stern, while the remaining guns were positioned on the upper deck and protected by gun shields. These guns fired 45-pound (20.4 kg) AP shells at a muzzle velocity of 2,150 feet per second (660 m/s). The ships were also equipped with four 40-caliber QF 12-pounder 12-cwt guns. (Note: "Cwt" is the abbreviation for hundredweight, 12 cwt referring to the weight of the gun.) The 3-inch (76 mm) gun fired 12.5-pound (5.7 kg) projectiles at a muzzle velocity of 2,359 feet per second (719 m/s). The Tsukuba-class ships were equipped with three submerged torpedo tubes, one on each broadside, and one in the stern. All of the tubes in Tsukuba, and the stern tube in Ikoma, were 18 inches (457 mm) in diameter. The broadside tubes in Ikoma, however, were 21 inches (533 mm) in size.

=== Armor ===
In order to keep the displacement down and the speed the same as in the earlier armored cruisers, armor in the Tsukuba class was about the same in thickness, although in an improved layout. The waterline armor belt of Krupp cemented armor was 7 inches (178 mm) thick between the 12-inch gun turrets although it was only 4 inches (102 mm) thick fore and aft of the turrets. Above it was a strake of 5-inch (127 mm) armor that extended between the barbettes and protected the 6-inch casemates. The aft ends of the main armor belt were connected to the main gun barbettes by 1-inch (25 mm) transverse bulkheads. The lack of a forward bulkhead and the thinness of the aft bulkhead were serious weaknesses in the ships' protection.

The front of the main gun turrets were protected by armor plates 9.6 inches (244 mm) thick, the sides by 9-inch (229 mm) plates and they had a 1.5-inch (38 mm) roof. The main barbettes were protected by seven inches of armour. The thickness of the armored decks ranged in thickness from 1.5 inches on the flat and at the ends of the ship to 2 inches (51 mm) on the slope of the deck. The sides of the forward conning tower were 8 inches (203 mm) thick and it had a 3-inch roof.

== Ships in class ==
Construction data
Ship	Namesake	Builder	Laid down	Launched	Completed
Tsukuba	Mount Tsukuba	Kure Naval Arsenal	14 January 1905	26 December 1905	14 January 1907
Ikoma	Mount Ikoma	Kure Naval Arsenal	15 March 1905	9 April 1906	24 March 1908

== Construction and service ==
The Yokosuka Naval Arsenal had the most experience in building warships, but the IJN feared a bombardment by the Russian 2nd and 3rd Pacific Squadrons then en route from the Baltic Sea and decided to build the Tsukubas at the less-exposed Kure Naval Arsenal, even though Kure's experience was with ship repair and conversions. This meant that skilled workers had to be brought from Yokosuka to train the workforce at Kure in construction techniques. Tsukuba was laid down after the newly constructed Slipway No. 3 was completed in November 1904 and Ikoma followed once the extension of Slipway No. 2 was finished. These ships were over three times larger than the biggest ship previously built in Japan, the 4,217-long-ton (4,285 t) protected cruiser Hashidate. Priority of effort was given to the building of Tsukuba and she was completed in a very creditable two years. Ikoma took an additional year to finish as the end of the war shortly after she was laid down reduced the pressure to complete her as fast as possible. In addition, her slipway initially lacked any cranes or derricks to lift heavy material until electrically powered steel shearleg derricks were improvised. Construction of both ships was somewhat delayed by difficulties in procuring enough steel plates and rivets; quantities of both had to be imported from the United States.

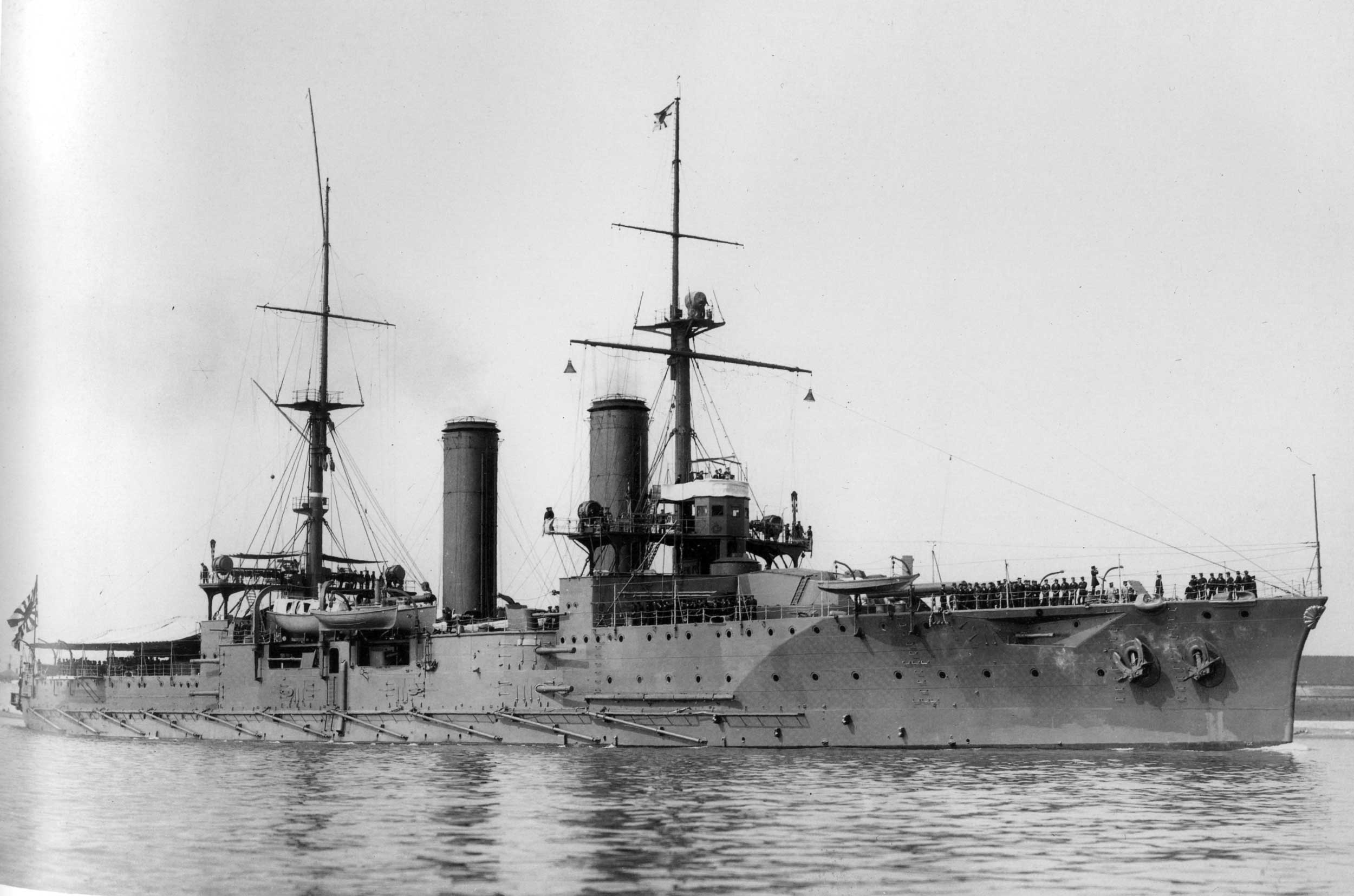
Tsukuba moving at slow speed, before 1913

Possibly due to the speed at which she was constructed, Tsukuba reportedly suffered from numerous defects. Shortly after she was completed, the ship sailed for America where she participated in the Jamestown Exposition Naval Review in May–June 1907. The ship then sailed to Europe where she made numerous port visits over the next several months. While in Britain, Tsukuba was fitted with a Vickers fire-control system that calculated the firing data for each gun and with which the gunnery officer fired the guns in unison. Ikoma visited England in July 1910 as part of the Japan–British Exhibition.

The Tsukuba-class ships were reclassified as battlecruisers in 1912. Around 1913–14, the main deck 6-inch guns were removed and six were reinstalled on the upper deck where they replaced four 4.7-inch guns. This gave them a total of ten 6-inch and eight 4.7-inch guns. Shortly after the beginning of World War I in August 1914, Tsukuba was assigned to the 1st South Seas Squadron that searched for the East Asia Squadron in the German-owned islands in the Central Pacific. On 7 October, a landing party from the ship occupied Ponape in the Caroline Islands. Ikoma joined the squadron in November, shortly before it moved to Fiji in December. Tsukuba was assigned as a gunnery training ship in 1916. By 1917, both ships were assigned to the 2nd Division and Tsukuba was sunk by a magazine explosion on 14 January with the loss of 305 crewmen; her wreck was later salvaged and scrapped.

Ikoma became a gunnery training ship in her turn in 1918 and her armament was augmented by a pair of 8 cm/40 3rd Year Type anti-aircraft (AA) guns the following year. She was re-rated back to first-class cruiser in 1921 and disarmed in 1922 to fulfill the requirements of the Washington Naval Treaty. The ship was broken up in November 1924.
