= 15 cm/45 41st Year Type =

15 cm/45 41st Year Type 6"/45 (15.2 cm) Elswick 6"/45 (15.2 cm) 41st Year Type
- Type: naval gun coastal artillery
- Place of origin: United Kingdom

Service history
- In service: 1906–1945
- Used by: Empire of Japan
- Wars: World War I World War II

Production history
- Designer: Elswick Ordnance Company
- Designed: 1904
- Manufacturer: Armstrong Whitworth; Kure Naval Arsenal
- Produced: 1906

Specifications
- Mass: 7.5 t (7.4 long tons; 8.3 short tons)
- Length: 7 m (23 ft 0 in)
- Barrel length: 6.858 m (22 ft 6.0 in), 45 calibres
- Shell: Separate loading bagged charge 49 lb (22 kg) and projectile
- Shell weight: 100 lb (45 kg)
- Calibre: 6 in (152.4 mm)
- Breech: Interrupted screw
- Elevation: -5° to +18°
- Traverse: -150° to +150° (single pedestal mount)
- Rate of fire: 5 rpm
- Muzzle velocity: 825 m/s (2,710 ft/s)
- Maximum firing range: 14.8 km (9.2 mi) at 18°

The 15 cm/45 41st Year Type was a British naval gun designed by the Elswick Ordnance Company for export in the years before World War I that armed warships of the Imperial Japanese Navy. Initially known as 6"/45 (15.2 cm) Elswick and 6"/45 (15.2 cm) 41st Year Type

These guns served aboard Japanese ships during World War I and as coastal artillery during World War II.

== History ==
The 15 cm/45 41st Year began life as a design produced by the parent company of Elswick, Armstrong Whitworth for export customers and called the Pattern GG. These guns did not serve aboard ships of the Royal Navy. The gun was renamed "6 inch /45 (15.2 cm) 41st Year Type" on 25 December 1908. On 5 October 1917 the Japanese designation system for artillery changed to metric and the gun was designated the "15 cm/45 41st Year Type". Whether the guns originated in Britain or were built in Japan they still shared the same 41st Year designation.

== Construction ==
The 15 cm/45 41st Year was constructed of an A tube and wire wound with a protective outer jacket. Ships built in British shipyards for Japan were armed with Pattern GG guns and later Japan produced their own versions under license at the Kure Naval Arsenal. Four different models were produced at Kure which differed in the style of rifling used. Although sometimes referred to as QF guns, they were actually BL guns which used separate loading bagged charges and projectiles.

== Naval use ==
15 cm/45 41st Year guns equipped armoured cruisers, pre-dreadnought battleships and protected cruisers of the Imperial Japanese Navy.

=== Armoured cruisers ===
- Tsukuba-class cruiser - The two ships of this class had a secondary armament of twelve EOC Pattern GG guns in single casemated mounts amidships.
- Aso - This ship was the former Bayan of the Imperial Russian Navy sunk and captured at Port Arthur in 1905. The ship was repaired and recommissioned into the Imperial Japanese Navy in 1908 as the Aso. The Bayan's secondary armament of eight single casemated 152 mm 45 calibre Pattern 1892 guns were replaced with eight EOC Pattern GG guns.

=== Pre-dreadnought battleships ===
- Kawachi-class battleships - The two ships of this class had a secondary armament of ten 15 cm/45 41st Year guns in single casemated mounts amidships.
- Aki - One of the two Satsuma-class ships, had a secondary armament of eight 15 cm/45 41st Year guns in single casemated mounts amidships.
- Kashima - This Katori-class ship had a secondary armament of ten EOC Pattern GG guns in single casemated mounts amidships.
- Mikasa - This ship had a secondary armament of fourteen 15 cm/45 41st Year guns in single casemated mounts amidships after a 1908 refit replaced the original 6 inch 40 calibre guns.

=== Protected cruisers ===
- Chikuma-class cruiser - The three ships of this class had a primary armament of eight 15 cm/45 41st Year guns. There was one single shielded mount fore and aft, and three shielded mounts per side in sponsons amidships.
- Tsugaru - This ship was the former Pallada of the Imperial Russian Navy sunk and captured at Port Arthur in 1905. The ship was repaired and recommissioned into the Imperial Japanese Navy in 1908 as the Tsugaru. The Pallada's original primary armament of eight 152 mm 45 calibre Pattern 1892 guns were replaced with eight 15 cm/45 41st Year guns.

== Ammunition ==
Ammunition was of separate loading bagged charge and projectile. The bagged charges weighed 22 kg (49 lb), while the projectiles weighed 100 lb (45 kg).

The gun was able to fire armor-piercing and Common (HE) shells

== Photo Gallery ==
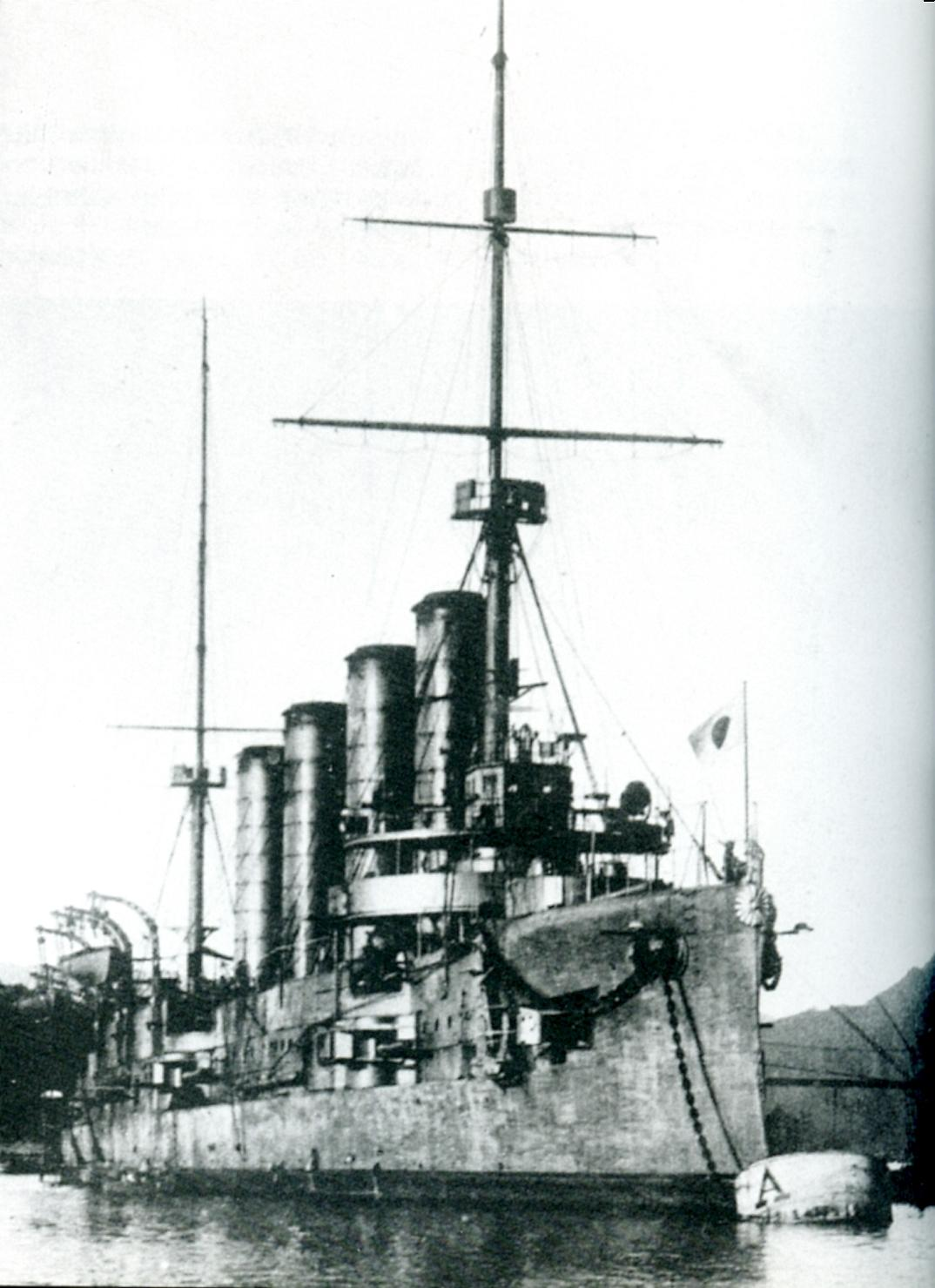
The armoured cruiser Aso.

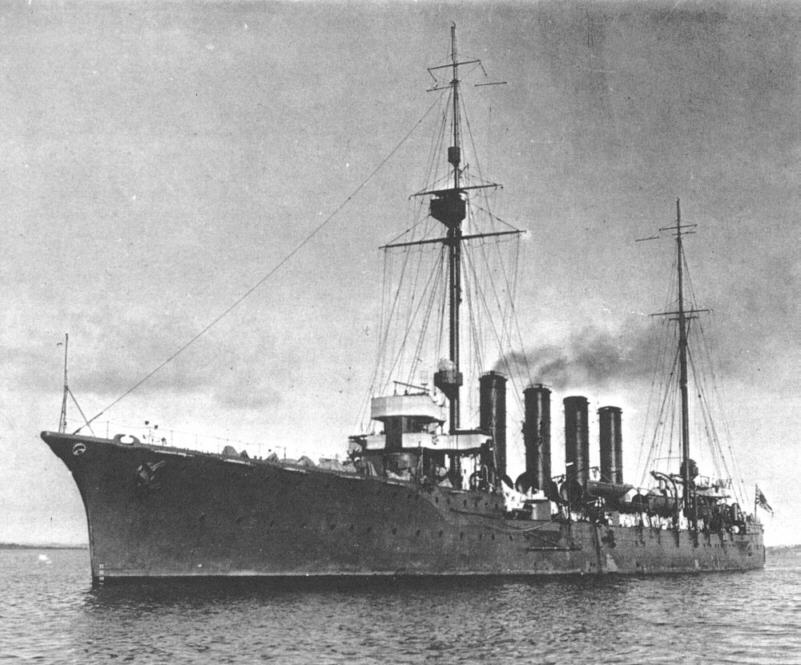
The protected cruiser Hirado.

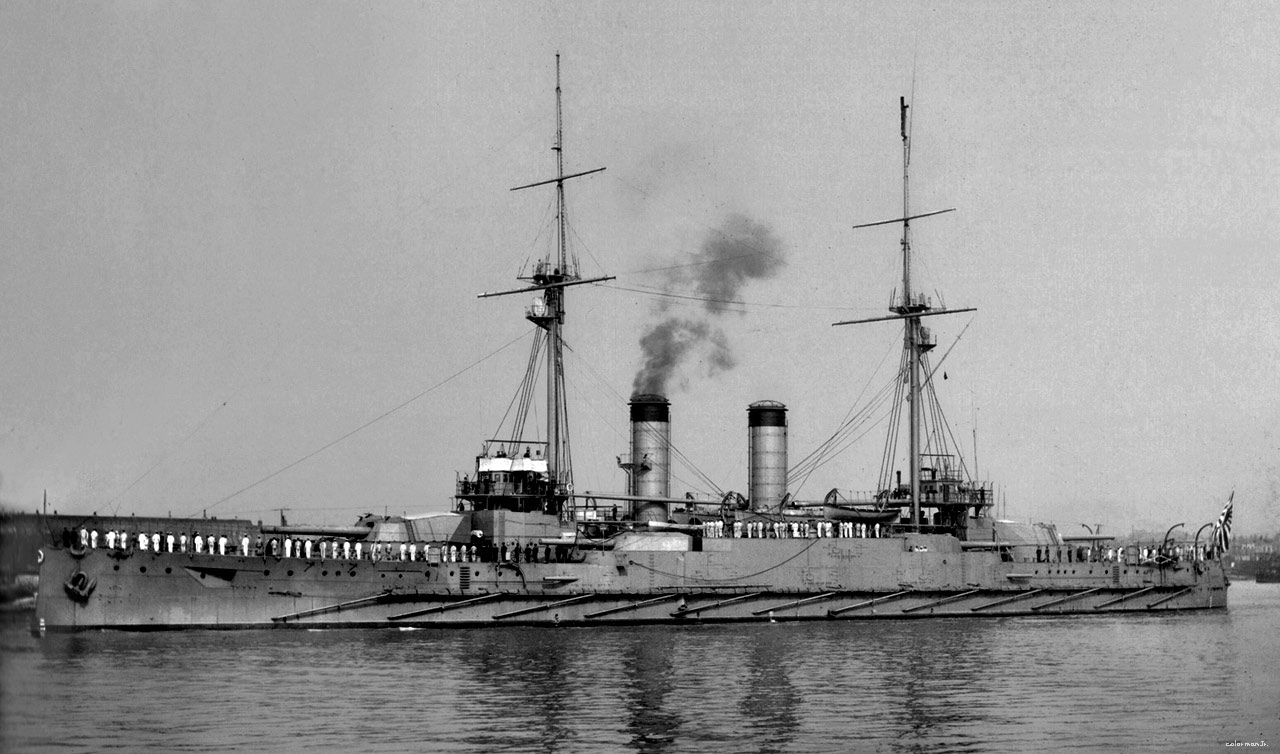
Battleship Kashima.

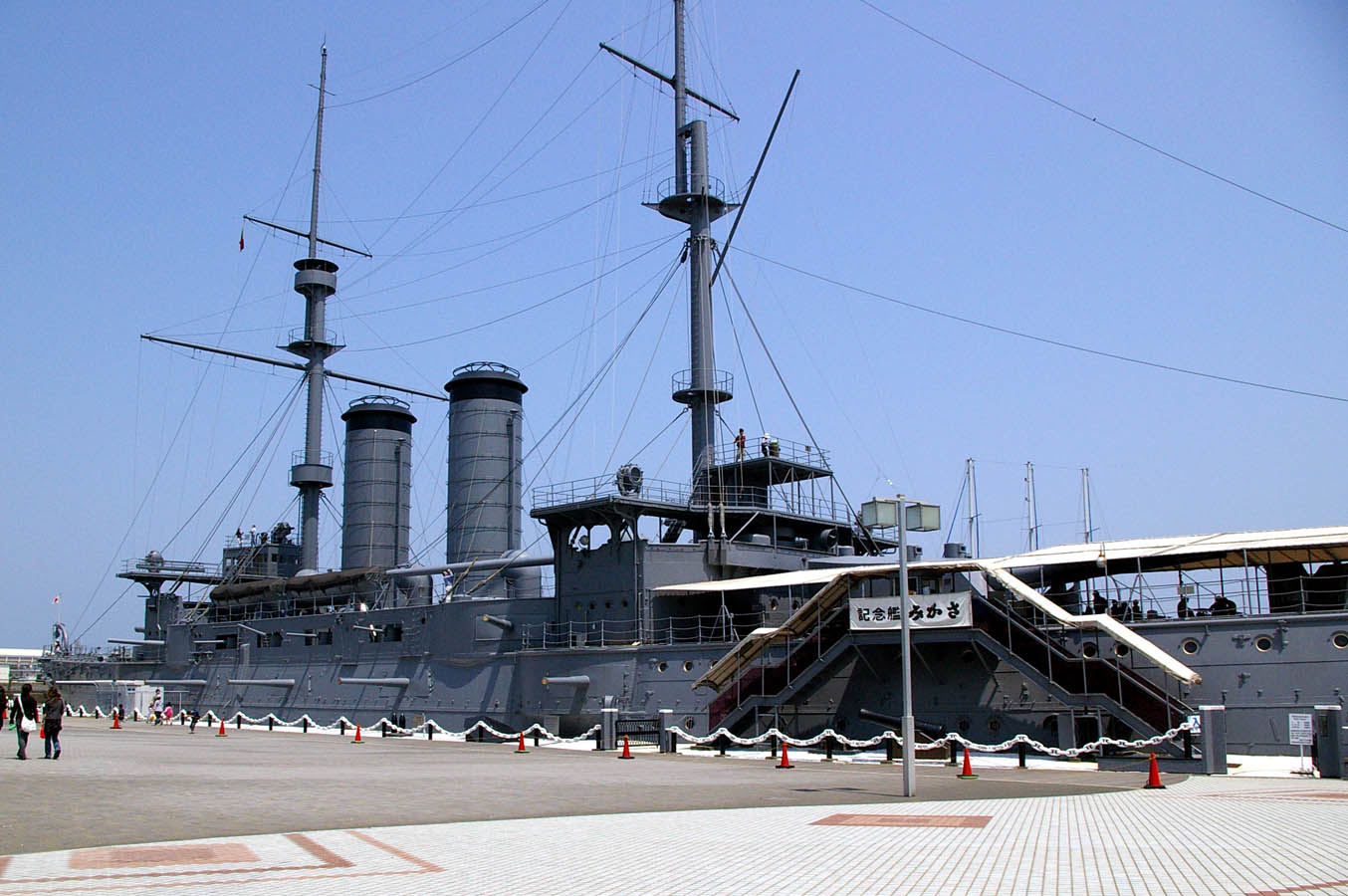
Mikasa.

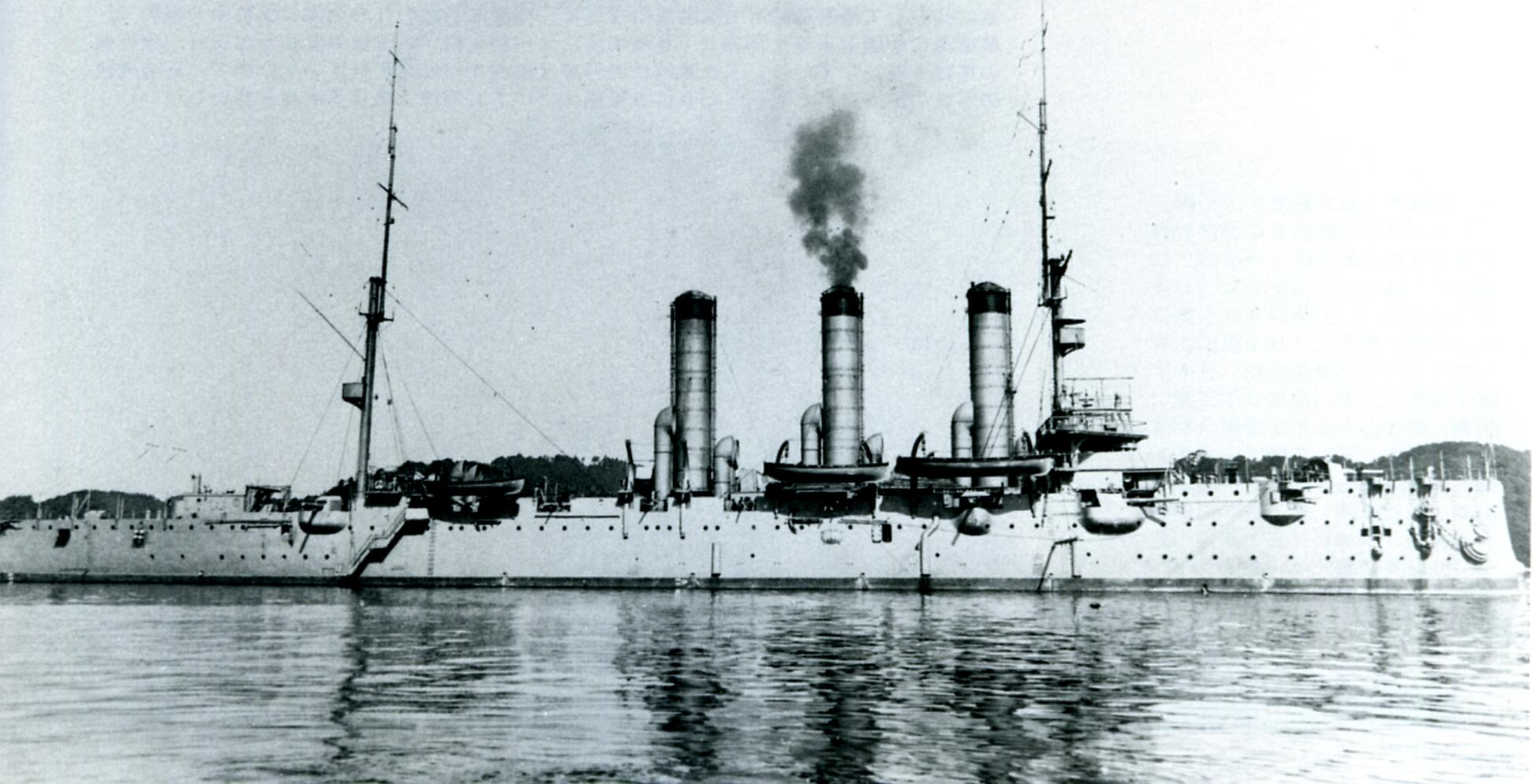
Tsugaru.
