= EOC 12-inch 45-calibre naval gun =

EOC 12 inch 45-calibre naval gun 12"/45 41st Year Type
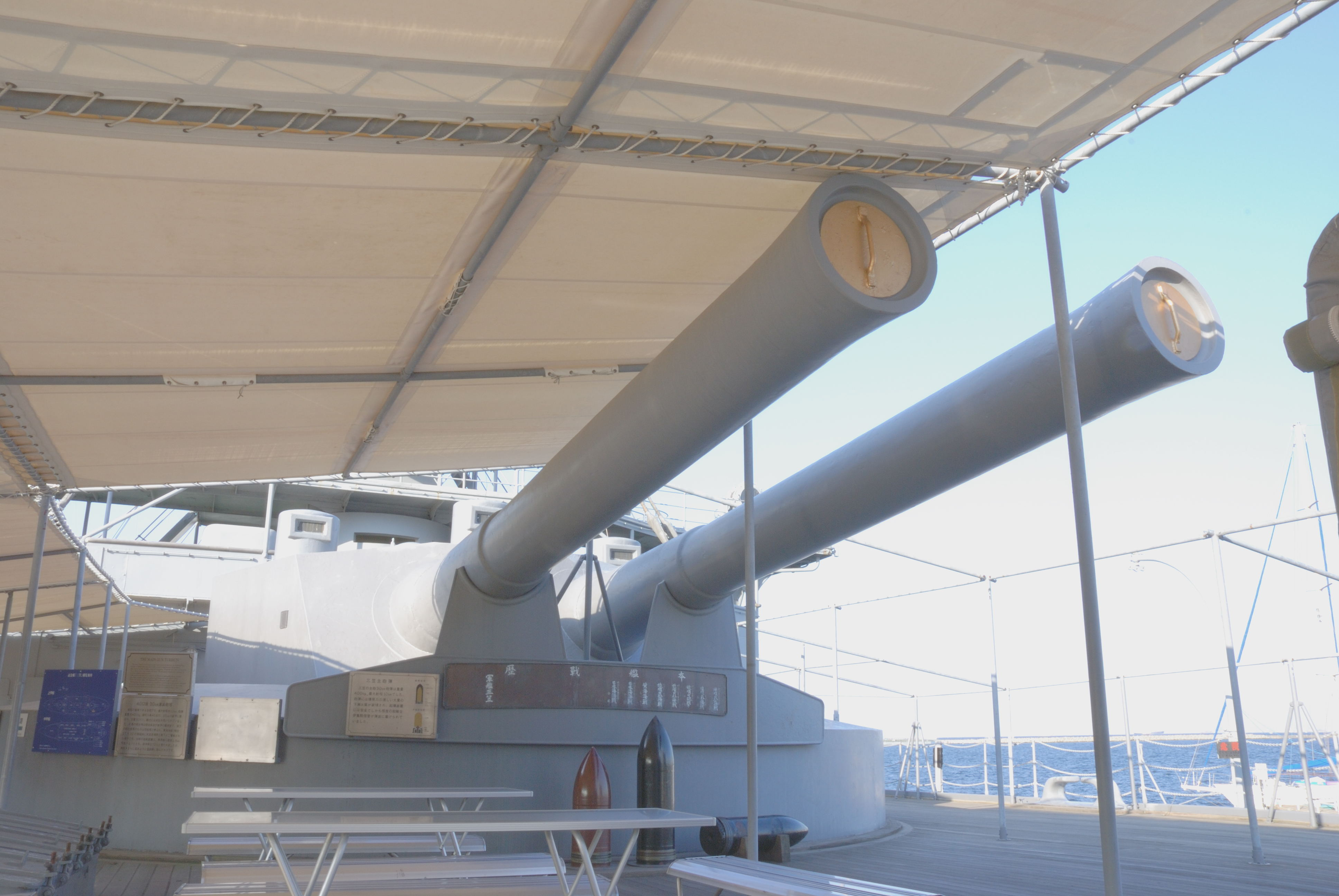
- 41st Year Type on Mikasa
- Type: Naval gun
- Place of origin: United Kingdom

Service history
- In service: 1906–1952
- Used by: United Kingdom; Brazil; Empire of Japan; Ottoman Empire
- Wars: World War I

Production history
- Designer: Elswick Ordnance Company

Specifications
- Barrel length: Bore 45 feet (13.716 m) (45 cal)
- Shell: 850 pounds (385.6 kg)
- Calibre: 12-inch (304.8 mm)
- Muzzle velocity: 2,700 feet per second (823 m/s) - 2,800 feet per second (853 m/s)
- Maximum firing range: 18,850 yards (17,240 m)

The EOC 12 inch 45 calibre gun were various similar 12-inch wire-wound naval guns designed and manufactured by Elswick Ordnance Company to equip ships that the parent company Armstrong Whitworth built and/or armed for several countries before World War I.

== History ==
=== Brazil service ===
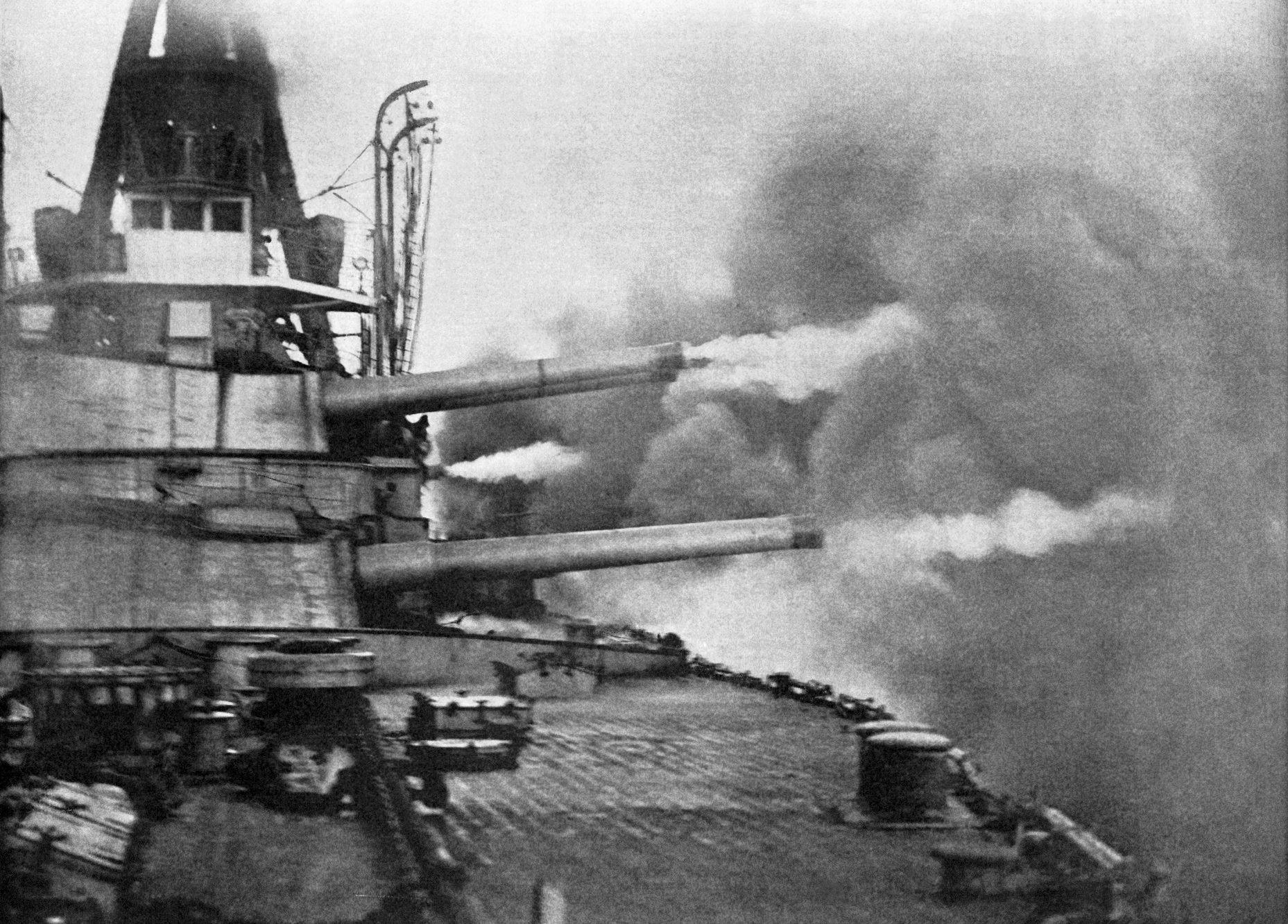
Brazilian battleship Minas Geraes's guns firing

Elswick supplied its 12-inch 45-calibre guns for the Minas Geraes-class battleships completed by itself and Vickers in 1910 for Brazil.

=== UK service ===
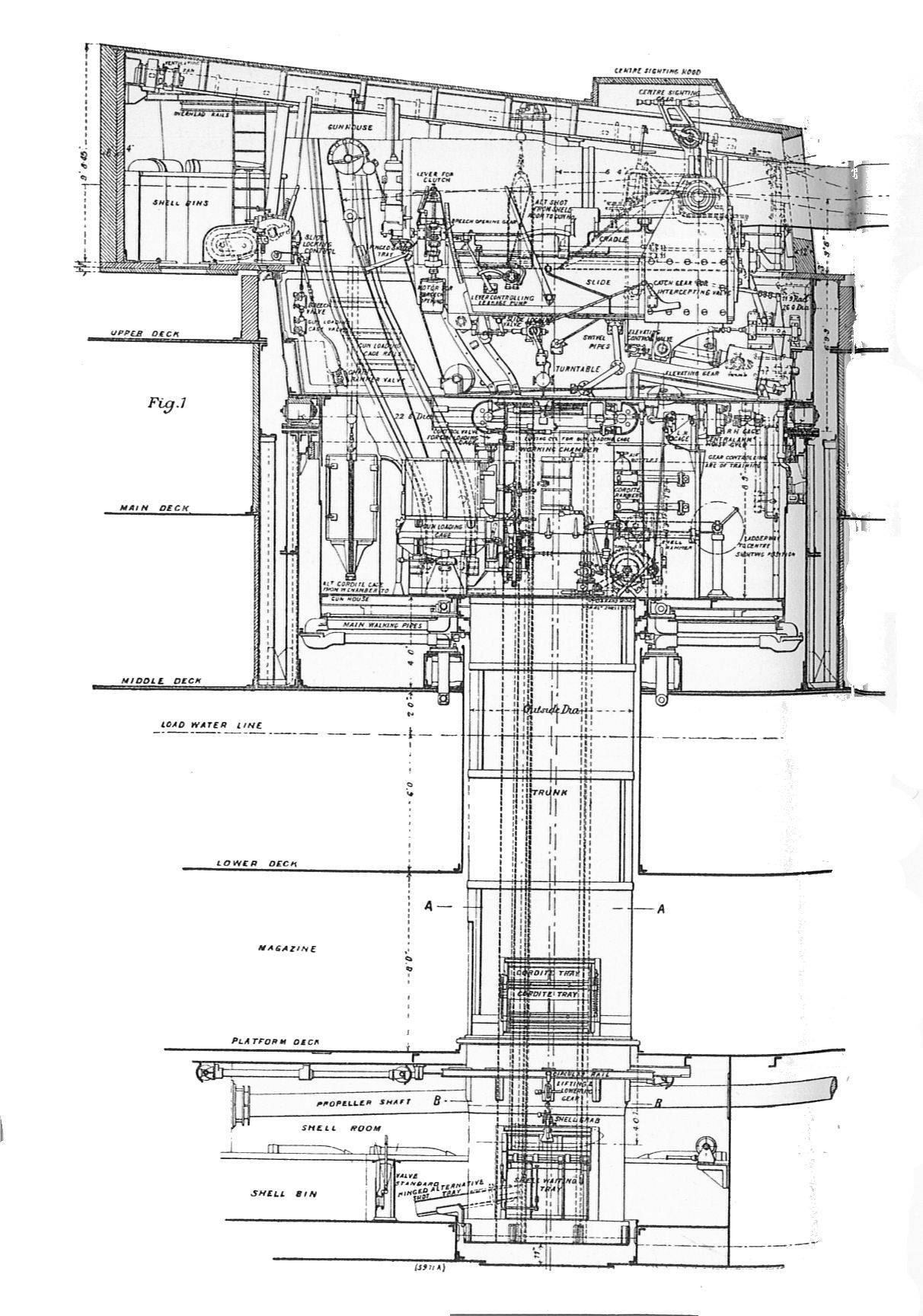
Section of barbette and gunhouse of HMS Agincourt

When World War I began, Elswick were completing the battleship Sultân Osmân-ı Evvel for the Ottoman Empire, originally begun as Rio de Janeiro for Brazil. It was armed with 14 of a slightly later version of Elswick's 12-inch 45-calibre guns. The battleship was completed as HMS Agincourt and served in the Royal Navy in World War I, with its guns designated BL 12 inch Mk XIII. (Note: Britain used Roman numerals to denote Marks (models) of ordnance until after World War II. This was the thirteenth model of BL 12-inch gun in British service.) The gun's performance was similar to the standard Royal Navy equivalent gun, the BL 12 inch Mk X designed by Vickers.

=== Japan service ===
Elswick supplied its 12-inch 45-calibre guns to the Imperial Japanese Navy, and they were also manufactured under licence in Japan. In Japanese service from 1908 they became 12"/45 41st Year Type and later after the navy metricised in 1917, 30 cm/45 41st Year Type. They equipped the following ship classes:

- Katori-class battleships commissioned 1906
- Ibuki-class battlecruiser commissioned in 1907 and 1911
- Tsukuba-class battlecruisers commissioned 1908
- Pre-dreadnought Mikasa as re-gunned in 1908
- Satsuma-class battleships commissioned 1910 and 1912
- Kawachi-class battleships commissioned 1912

== Surviving examples ==
- Replicas are mounted on the preserved Japanese battleship Mikasa, Yokosuka, Japan.

== See also ==
- List of naval guns

=== Weapons of comparable role, performance and era ===
- 305mm/45 Modèle 1906 gun French equivalent
- BL 12 inch Mk X naval gun Vickers equivalent
- 12"/45 caliber Mark 5 gun US equivalent
