= Italian cruiser San Marco =

Italian San Giorgio-class cruiser

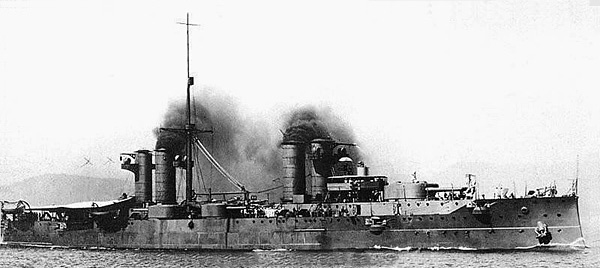
- San Marco underway, 18 August 1910

History

Italy
- Name: San Marco
- Namesake: Saint Mark
- Ordered: 18 September 1905
- Builder: Regio Cantieri di Castellammare di Stabia, Castellammare di Stabia
- Laid down: 2 January 1907
- Launched: 20 December 1908
- Reclassified: As target ship, 1931
- Stricken: 27 February 1947
- Fate: Sunk, 1945; Scrapped, 1949

General characteristics
- Class & type: San Giorgio-class armoured cruiser
- Displacement: 10,969 t (10,796 long tons)
- Length: 140.89 m (462 ft 3 in) (o/a)
- Beam: 21.03 m (69 ft 0 in)
- Draught: 7.76 m (25 ft 6 in)
- Installed power: 23,000 shp (17,000 kW); 14 water-tube boilers
- Propulsion: 4 shafts, 4 steam turbines
- Speed: 23 knots (43 km/h; 26 mph)
- Range: 4,800 nmi (8,900 km; 5,500 mi) at 10 knots (19 km/h; 12 mph)
- Complement: 32 officers, 666–73 enlisted men
- Armament: 2 twin 254 mm (10.0 in)/45 guns; 4 twin 190 mm (7.5 in)/45 guns; 18 single 76 mm (3.0 in)/40 guns; 2 single 47 mm (1.9 in)/50 guns; 3 × 450 mm (17.7 in) torpedo tubes
- Armour: Belt: 200 mm (7.9 in); Gun turrets: 160–200 mm (6.3–7.9 in); Deck: 50 mm (2.0 in); Conning tower: 254 mm (10.0 in)

The Italian cruiser San Marco was a San Giorgio-class armoured cruiser built for the Royal Italian Navy (Regia Marina) in the first decade of the 20th century. She was the first large Italian ship fitted with steam turbines and the first turbine-powered ship in any navy to have four propeller shafts. The ship participated in the Italo-Turkish War of 1911–1912, during which time she supported the occupations of Benghazi and Derna, the island of Rhodes, and bombarded the fortifications defending the entrance to the Dardanelles. During World War I, San Marco's activities were limited by the threat of Austro-Hungarian submarines, although the ship did participate in the bombardment of Durazzo, Albania in late 1918. She played a minor role in the Corfu incident in 1923 and was converted into a target ship in the first half of the 1930s. San Marco was captured by the Germans when they occupied northern Italy in 1943 and was found sunk at the end of the war. The ship was broken up and scrapped in 1949.

== Design and description ==
The ships of the San Giorgio class were designed as improved versions of the Pisa-class design. San Marco's design featured several new innovations that differentiated her from her sister ship San Giorgio. San Marco was given the first steam turbines fitted in a large Italian ship and she was the first turbine-powered ship in any navy to have four shafts, the first with a gyroscopic compass, the first with antiroll tanks, and the first not to use wood in any way.

San Marco had a length between perpendiculars of 131.04 metres (429 ft 11 in) and an overall length of 140.89 metres (462 ft 3 in). She had a beam of 21.03 metres (69 ft 0 in) and a draught of 7.76 metres (25 ft 6 in). The ship displaced 10,969 tonnes (10,796 long tons) at normal load, and 11,900 tonnes (11,700 long tons) at deep load. Her complement was 32 officers and 666 to 673 enlisted men.

The ship was powered by four steam turbines, each driving one propeller shaft using steam supplied by 14 Babcock & Wilcox boilers. Designed for a maximum output of 23,000 shaft horsepower (17,000 kW) and a speed of 23 knots (43 km/h; 26 mph), San Marco handily exceeded this, reaching a speed of 23.75 knots (43.99 km/h; 27.33 mph) during her sea trials from 23,030 ihp (17,170 kW). The ship was also required to be a half a knot faster than San Giorgio, a requirement she easily surpassed. San Marco had a cruising range of 4,800 nautical miles (8,900 km; 5,500 mi) at a speed of 10 knots (19 km/h; 12 mph).

The main armament of the San Giorgio-class ships consisted of four Cannone da 254/45 A Modello 1908 guns in twin-gun turrets fore and aft of the superstructure. The ships mounted eight Cannone da 190/45 A Modello 1908 in four twin-gun turrets, two in each side amidships, as their secondary armament. For defense against torpedo boats, they carried 18 quick-firing (QF) 40-caliber 76 mm (3.0 in) guns. Eight of these were mounted in embrasures in the sides of the hull and the rest in the superstructure. The ships were also fitted with a pair of 40-caliber QF 47 mm (1.9 in) guns. The San Giorgios were also equipped with three submerged 450 mm (17.7 in) torpedo tubes. During World War I, eight of the 76 mm guns were replaced by six 76 mm anti-aircraft guns and one torpedo tube was removed.

The ships were protected by an armoured belt that was 200 mm (7.9 in) thick amidships and reduced to 80 mm (3.1 in) at the bow and stern. The armoured deck was 50 mm (2.0 in) thick and the conning tower armour was 254 mm thick. The 254 mm gun turrets were protected by 200 mm of armour while the 190 mm turrets had 160 mm (6.3 in).

== Construction and career ==
San Marco, named after Saint Mark, the patron saint of Venice, was ordered on 18 September 1905 and laid down on 2 January 1907 at the Regio Cantieri di Castellammare di Stabia in Castellammare di Stabia, on the Bay of Naples. The ship was launched on 20 December 1907 and completed on 7 February 1911.

When the Italo-Turkish War of 1911–1912 began on 29 September 1911, San Marco was not initially assigned to the 2nd Division of the 1st Squadron of the Mediterranean Fleet. She was assigned to the Division on 1 October and later escorted several Italian transports that arrived off Derna, Libya on 15 October together with the battleship Napoli and the armoured cruisers Pisa and Amalfi. After negotiations for a surrender of the town fell apart, Pisa shelled the barracks and a fort. There was no return fire from Derna, so a boat with offers of a truce was sent in. When it was greeted by a volley of rifle fire, San Marco and the other armoured cruisers opened fire on the town with their 190 mm guns and, according to a contemporary account, "completely destroyed" the town in 30 minutes time. A landing party was unable to reach the shore because of rough seas and gunfire from the shore. San Marco and her consorts then shelled the beach for two hours. Weather conditions prevented a landing until the 18th, when 1,500 men took possession of Derna. The ship then supported Italian troops at Benghazi in December. In mid-April 1912 the Italian fleet sortied into the eastern Aegean Sea with Pisa and Amalfi leading in an attempt to lure out the Ottoman fleet. When that failed, the Italians bombarded the fortifications defending the Dardanelles to little effect before the main body departed for Italy on the 19th. In May San Marco provided support for the occupation of Rhodes and finally returned home on 20 September.

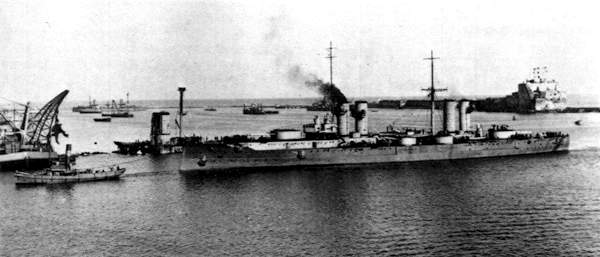
San Marco at Brindisi on 13 December 1916

She was used for experiments evaluating shipboard operation of seaplanes before the start of World War I. The ship was based at Brindisi when Italy declared war on the Central Powers on 23 May 1915. That night, the Austro-Hungarian Navy bombarded the Italian coast in an attempt to disrupt the Italian mobilization. Of the many targets, Ancona was hardest hit, with disruptions to the town's gas, electric, and telephone service; the city's stockpiles of coal and oil were left in flames. All of the Austrian ships safely returned to port, putting pressure on the Regia Marina to stop the attacks. When the Austrians resumed bombardments on the Italian coast in mid-June, Admiral Paolo Thaon di Revel responded by sending San Marco and the other armoured cruisers at Brindisi—the navy's newest—to Venice to supplement the older ships already there. Shortly after their arrival at Venice, Amalfi was sunk by a submarine on 7 July and her loss severely restricted the activities of the other ships based at Venice. San Marco later participated in the bombardment of Durazzo (now known as Durrës) on 2 October 1918 which sank one merchantman and damaged two others.

On 21 September 1923, the ship transported to Taranto the bodies of the members of the Boundary Commission killed on Corfu on 27 August (their deaths sparked the Corfu incident). On 1 October, San Marco ferried the last occupation troops from Corfu to Brindisi. On 16 March 1924, she saluted King Victor Emmanuel III when he arrived in Fiume to attend the ceremony commemorating the city's annexation by Italy. San Marco escorted Crown Prince Umberto, travelling aboard San Giorgio, during his South American tour in July–September 1924.

San Marco was disarmed and converted into a radio-controlled (by the elderly destroyer Audace) target ship in 1931–1935. Her old boilers were replaced by four oil-burning Thornycroft-type boilers which reduced her maximum speed to 18 knots (33 km/h; 21 mph) from 13,000 shaft horsepower (9,700 kW). During a naval review for Adolf Hitler in the Bay of Naples on 5 May 1938, the ship was used as a target by the heavy cruisers Fiume and Zara. She was captured by the Germans when they occupied La Spezia on 9 September 1943; the ship was found at the end of the war sunk in the harbor there. San Marco was formally stricken from the Navy List on 27 February 1947 and broken up in 1949.

== Bibliography ==
- Attilio, Dagnino (December 1911). "Italy's First Turbine-Driven Cruiser, the San Marco". International Marine Engineering. 16: 477–480.
- Beehler, William Henry (1913). The History of the Italian-Turkish War, Sept. 29, 1911 to Oct. 18, 1912. Annapolis, Maryland: Advertiser-Republican. OCLC 63576798.
- Fraccaroli, Aldo (1970). Italian Warships of World War I. London: Ian Allan. ISBN 0-7110-0105-7.
- Fraccaroli, Aldo (1972). RN Zara 1929–1941. Warship Profile. Vol. 17. Windson, UK: Profile Publications. ISBN 0-85383-060-6.
- Gardiner, Robert & Gray, Randal, eds. (1985). Conway's All the World's Fighting Ships 1906–1921. Annapolis: Naval Institute Press. ISBN 0-87021-907-3.
- Halpern, Paul S. (1994). A Naval History of World War I. Annapolis, Maryland: Naval Institute Press. ISBN 1-55750-352-4.
- Layman, R. D. (1996). Naval Aviation in the First World War: Its Impact and Influence. Annapolis, Maryland: Naval Institute Press. ISBN 1-55750-617-5.
- Marchese, Giuseppe (February 1996). "La Posta Militare della Marina Italiana 8^ puntata". La Posta Militare (in Italian) (72). Archived from the original on 2015-09-24.
- Silverstone, Paul H. (1984). Directory of the World's Capital Ships. New York: Hippocrene Books. ISBN 0-88254-979-0.
- Sondhaus, Lawrence (1994). The Naval Policy of Austria-Hungary, 1867–1918: Navalism, Industrial Development, and the Politics of Dualism. West Lafayette, Indiana: Purdue University Press. ISBN 978-1-55753-034-9. OCLC 59919233.
- Stephenson, Charles (2014). A Box of Sand: The Italo-Ottoman War 1911–1912: The First Land, Sea and Air War. Ticehurst, UK: Tattered Flag Press. ISBN 978-0-9576892-7-5.
