= Cannone da 190/45 =

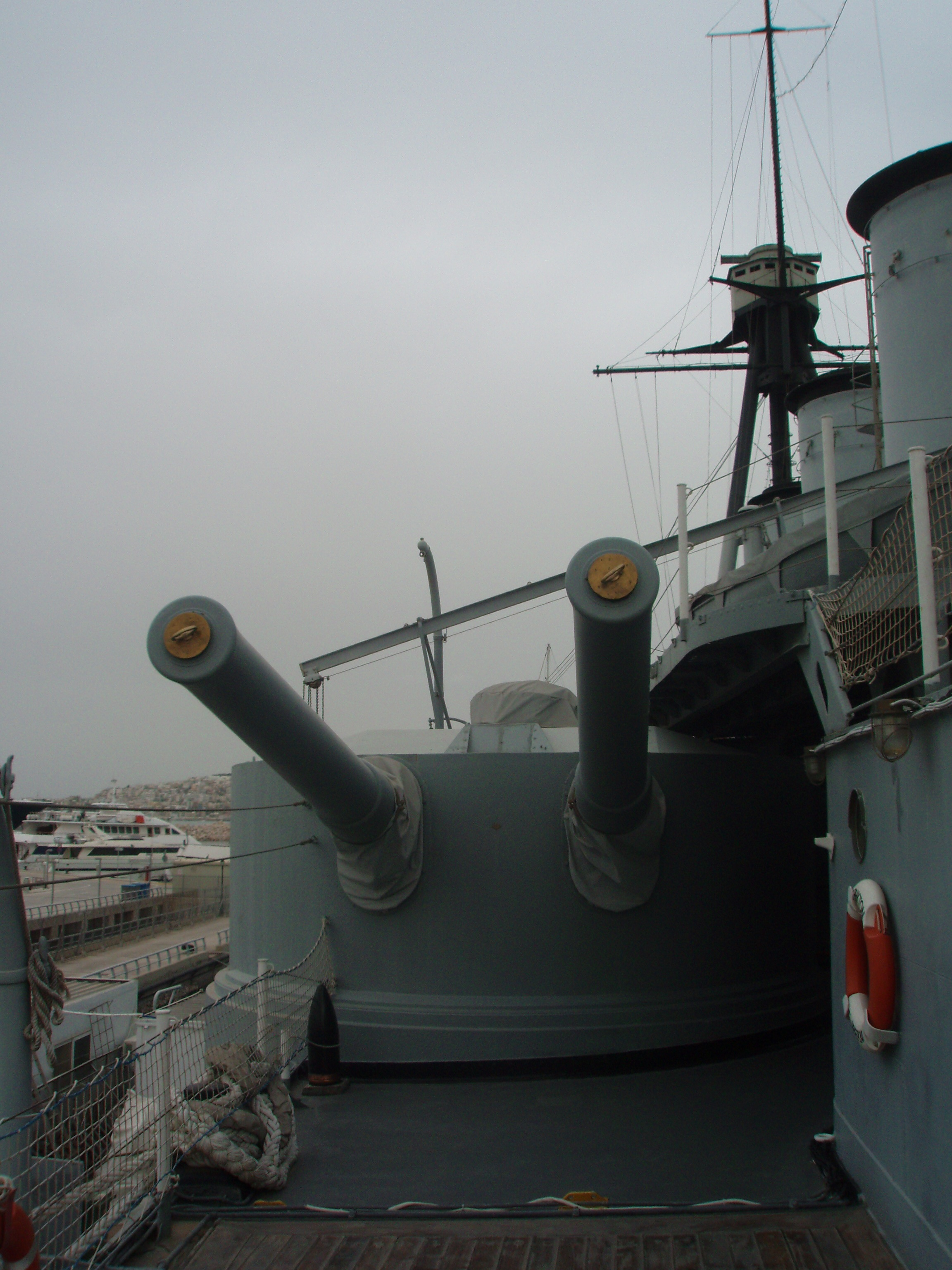
- Rear port-side turret aboard Georgios Averof
- Type: Naval gun Coastal artillery
- Place of origin: UK

Service history
- In service: 1909–1956
- Used by: Italy; Greece
- Wars: Balkan Wars; Italo-Turkish War; World War I World War II

Production history
- Designer: Vickers; Armstrong Whitworth
- Designed: Vickers: 1906; Armstrong: 1908
- Manufacturer: Vickers; Armstrong Whitworth
- Produced: 1910
- Variants: 190/45 V Model 1906; 190/45 A Model 1908

Specifications
- Mass: 15 t (17 short tons)
- Length: 8.9 m (29 ft)
- Barrel length: 8.6 m (28 ft) 45 caliber
- Shell: Separate loading bagged charge and projectile
- Shell weight: AP: 91 kg (201 lb)
- Caliber: 190 mm (7.5 in)
- Breech: Welin breech block
- Elevation: -7° to +25°
- Traverse: -80° to +80°
- Rate of fire: 2-3 rpm
- Muzzle velocity: 864 m/s (2,830 ft/s)
- Maximum firing range: 22 km (14 mi) at +25°

The Cannone da 190/45 was a family of Italian naval guns that were the secondary armament of two classes of armored cruisers of the Regia Marina and Hellenic Navy built before World War I. The cruisers that they were aboard saw action in both world wars. It is also believed that spare guns may have been used as coastal artillery during World War II.

== History ==
There were actually two guns from different manufacturers that were classified as the Cannon da 190/45. One was the Model 1906 produced by Vickers which was based on their Mark "D" gun, while the second was the Model 1908 which was produced by Armstrong and based on their Elswick Pattern "C" gun. The dimensions for both guns were similar and both used the same projectiles and powder charges.

== Construction ==
Construction of the Vickers gun is believed to have been 'A' tube, inner 'A' tube, wire winding for 75% of their length, 'B' tube and jacket. A Welin breech block was used and separate loading bagged charges and projectiles were used. The two classes of armored cruisers that carried these guns were the Pisa-class and the San Giorgio-class.

Ship Details:
- Pisa-class - The three ships of this class were the Pisa and Amalfi for the Regia Marina and the Georgios Averof for the Hellenic Navy. The Pisa and Amalfi had eight 190/45 V Model 1906 guns in four hydraulically powered twin-gun turrets, two on each side of the superstructure amidships, as their secondary armament. The Averof had eight 190/45 A Model 1908 guns in four hydraulically powered twin-gun turrets, two on each side of the superstructure amidships, as its secondary armament.
- San Giorgio-class - The two ships of this class were the San Giorgio and the San Marco for the Regia Marina. The ships mounted eight 190/45 A Model 1908 guns in four electrically powered twin-gun turrets, two on each side of the superstructure amidships, as their secondary armament.

== Photo gallery ==
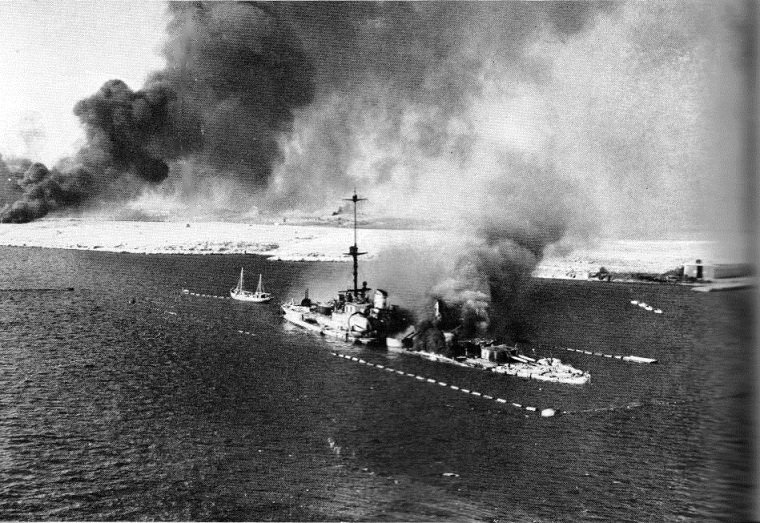
The Italian cruiser San Giorgio scuttled at Tobruk 1941

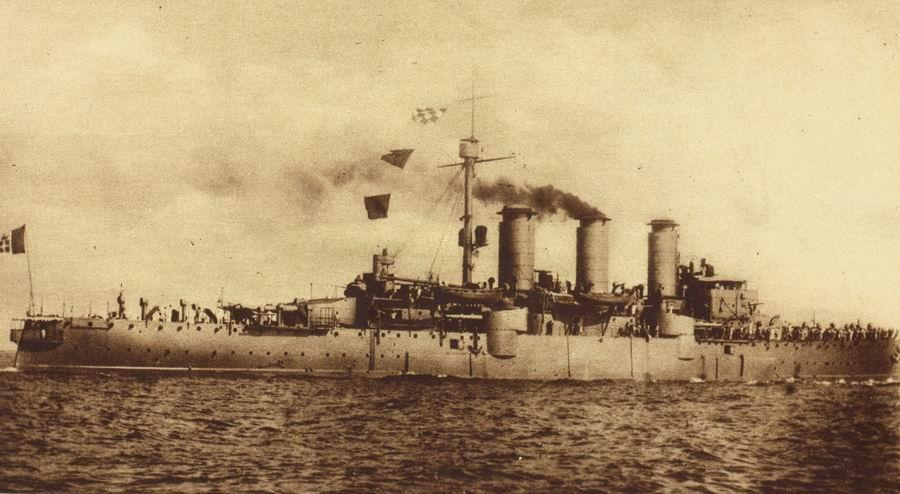
The Italian cruiser Amalfi in 1908

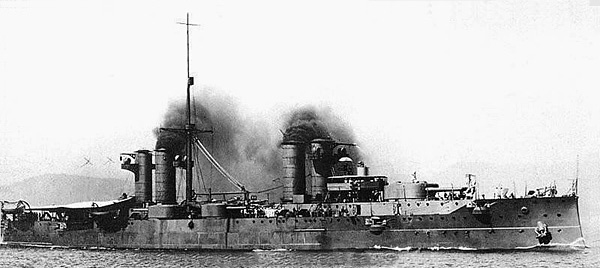
The Italian cruiser San Marco in August 1910

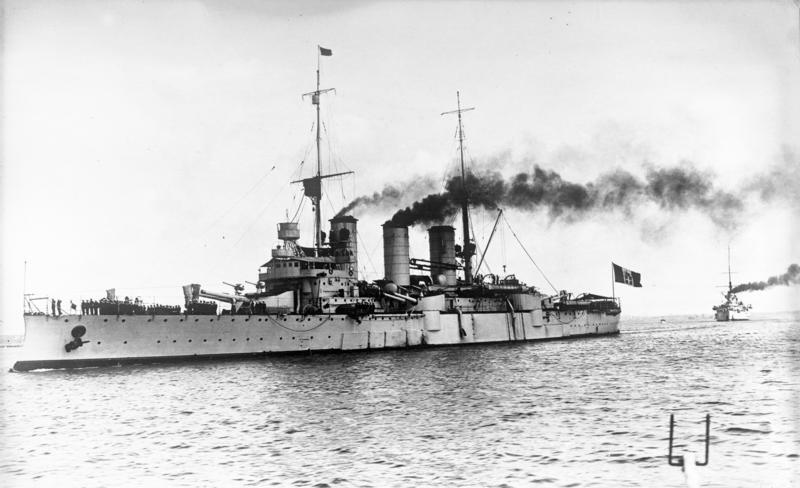
The Italian cruiser Pisa in February 1932.

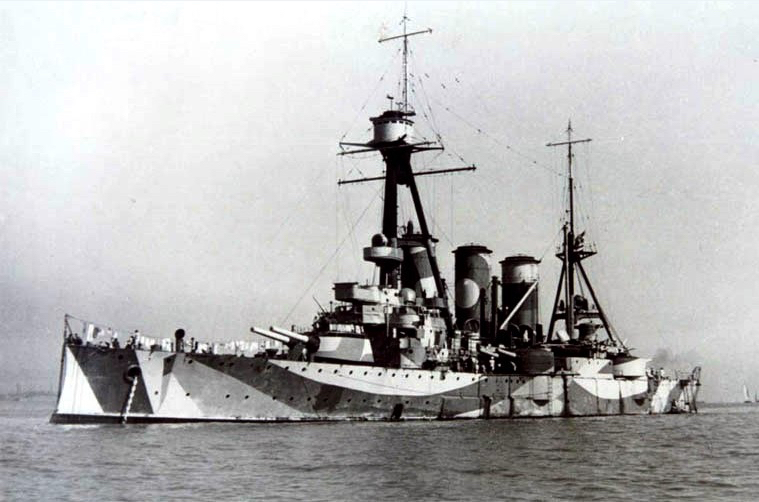
"RHNS Georgios Averof" in camo paint, RN Bombay Station, 1942, while serving under UK Royal Navy Command
