= Italian cruiser Amalfi =

Italian Pisa-class cruiser

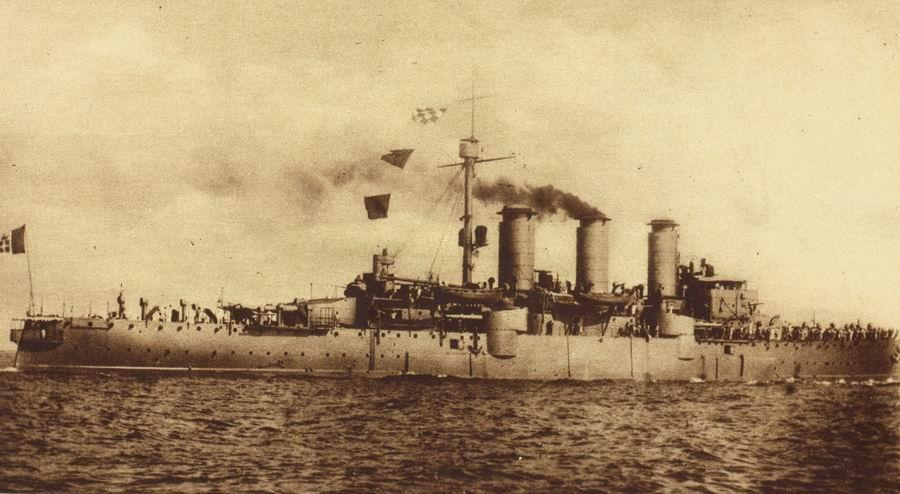
- Rear quarter view of Amalfi underway at slow speed

History

Kingdom of Italy
- Name: Amalfi
- Namesake: Amalfi
- Builder: Odero, Sestri Ponente
- Laid down: 24 July 1905
- Launched: 5 May 1908
- Completed: 1 September 1909
- Fate: Sunk 7 July 1915

General characteristics
- Class & type: Pisa-class armored cruiser
- Displacement: 9,832 t (9,677 long tons)
- Length: 426 ft 6 in (130.00 m) (pp); 461 ft (140.5 m) (oa)
- Beam: 68 ft 11 in (21.01 m)
- Draft: 22 ft 8 in (6.91 m)
- Installed power: 20,000 ihp (15,000 kW); 22 × coal-fired Belleville boilers
- Propulsion: 2 × propeller shafts; 2 × vertical triple-expansion steam engines
- Speed: 23 knots (43 km/h; 26 mph)
- Endurance: 2,500 nmi (4,600 km; 2,900 mi) at 12 knots (22 km/h; 14 mph); 1,400 nmi (2,600 km; 1,600 mi) at 21 knots (39 km/h; 24 mph)
- Armament: 2 × twin 254 mm (10.0 in)/45 guns; 4 × twin 190 mm (7.5 in)/45 guns; 16 × single 76 mm (3.0 in) guns; 8 × single 47 mm (1.9 in) guns; 3 × 450 mm (17.7 in) torpedo tubes
- Armor: Belt: 200 mm (7.9 in); Deck: 130 mm (5.1 in); Conning tower: 180 mm (7.1 in); 10 in gun turrets: 160 mm (6.3 in); 7.5 in gun turrets: 130 mm (5.1 in)

Amalfi was a Pisa-class armored cruiser of the Italian Royal Navy (Italian: Regia Marina) built in the first decade of the 20th century. During the Italo-Turkish War of 1911–1912, Amalfi operated with the Italian fleet off Tripoli in September 1911 and participated in the amphibious landings at Derna in October. In April 1912, Amalfi and sister ship Pisa led the way in attacks on Turkish forts in the Dardanelles. After the rest of the fleet retired later in the month, the pair of armored cruisers remained in the area to attack Turkish communications facilities. After the Treaty of Lausanne signed in October 1912 ended the war, Amalfi escorted the Italian king and queen on the royal yacht to Germany and Sweden during a 1913 visit.

At the outbreak of World War I in August 1914, Italy declined to join her Triple Alliance partners, Germany and Austria-Hungary. The country was eventually persuaded to side with the Entente Powers and declared war on neighboring Austria-Hungary in May 1915. After the Austro-Hungarian Navy raided the Italian coast with relative impunity in May and June, Amalfi, Pisa, and two other armored cruisers were sent to Venice to thwart future sorties by the Austrians. Shortly after their arrival, the ships were sent—in a show of force—to patrol near the main Austrian naval base at Pola on the night of 6/7 July 1915. During Amalfi's return from that mission, she was torpedoed by Austro-Hungarian submarine U-26 (in fact SM UB-14 flying the Austro-Hungarian flag, since Germany and Italy were not yet at war) and sunk with the loss of 67 men. Amalfi's loss caused the Italians to keep the other armored cruisers at Venice in port for most of the next year before they were eventually relocated.

== Design and description ==
As built, Amalfi was 461 feet (140.5 m) long overall by 68 feet 11 inches (21.01 m) abeam, with a draft of 22 feet 8 inches (6.91 m). She had twin propeller shafts powered by two vertical triple-expansion steam engines. The steam engines were fed from 22 coal-fired Belleville boilers. The projected output of her power plant was 20,000 indicated horsepower (15,000 kW), but in service Amalfi was able to produce 20,260 indicated horsepower (15,110 kW)—some 600 indicated horsepower (450 kW) less than her sister ship, Pisa—which was enough to give a maximum speed of 23.6 knots (43.7 km/h; 27.2 mph).

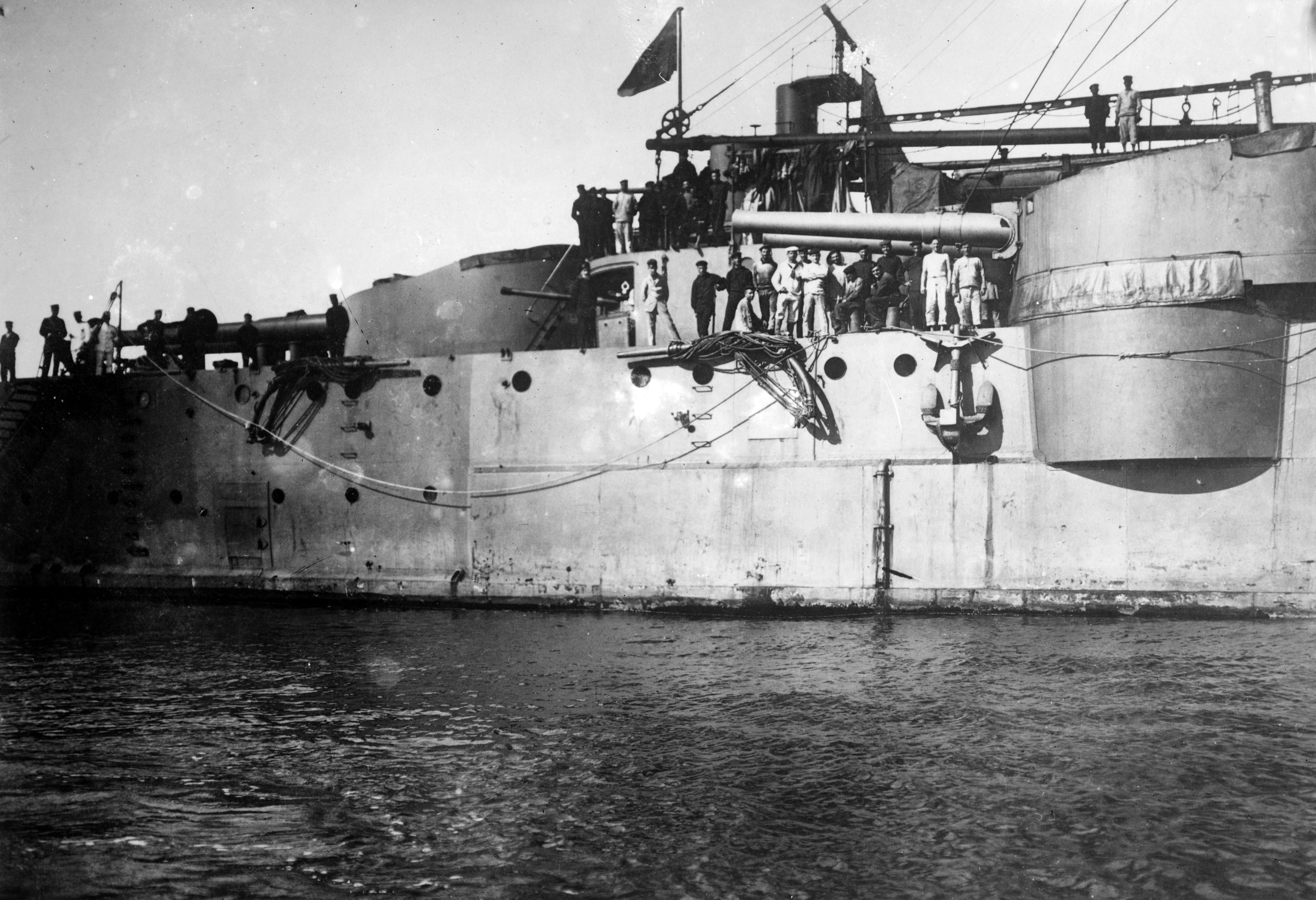
The guns of sister ship Pisa. On the left is the aft 254-millimetre (10.0 in) turret; on the right, the starboard rear 190-millimetre (7.5 in).

The main armament of the Pisa-class ships consisted of four Cannone da 254/45 V Modello 1906 guns in twin-gun turrets fore and aft of the superstructure. The ships mounted eight Cannone da 190/45 V Modello 1906 in four twin-gun turrets, two in each side amidships, as their secondary armament. For defense against torpedo boats, they carried 16 quick-firing (QF) Cannone da 76/50 V Modello 1908 guns and eight QF Cannone da 47/40 V Modello 1908 guns. They were also equipped with three submerged 450 mm (17.7 in) torpedo tubes. During World War I, Pisa's 76 and 47 mm guns were replaced by twenty 76/40 guns; six of these were anti-aircraft guns.

Amalfi was protected by a main belt of armor 200 millimetres (7.9 in) thick. The 10-inch gun turrets were protected by 160 millimetres (6.3 in) of armor plate, and the 7.5-inch gun turrets by 130 millimetres (5.1 in). The conning tower had armor 180 millimetres (7.1 in) thick, while the thickness of the deck armor was 130 millimeters.

== Construction and career ==
Work began on the pair of Pisa-class ships in August 1904, nearly a year before the keel of Amalfi, named after the eponymous city, was laid down on 24 July 1905 at the Cantieri navali Odero shipyard in Sestri Ponente. It was nearly three years before Amalfi was launched on 5 May 1908. The ship was completed on 1 September 1909, just over four years after her keel was laid.

=== Italo-Turkish War ===
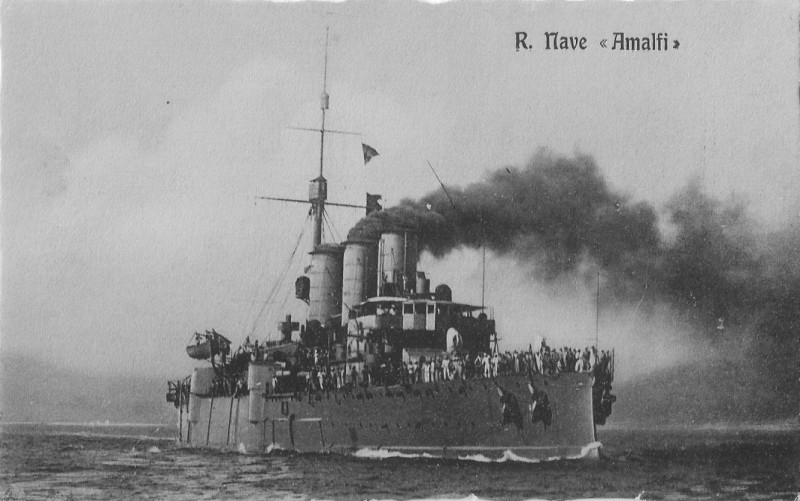
An Italian postcard of Amalfi

Amalfi and sister ship Pisa both entered service in 1909, but there is little information in sources on their activities until the 1911 Italo-Turkish War. On 24 September 1911, five days before Italy declared war against the Ottoman Empire to start the conflict, Amalfi departed from Syracuse for Tripoli as part of a squadron that included battleships Roma and Napoli; armored cruisers Pisa, Giuseppe Garibaldi, Varese, and Francesco Ferruccio; and two flotillas of destroyers. Five days later, Amalfi and several of the other ships were seen taking on coal at Malta, before heading on to blockade Tripoli.

On 2 October, a division headed by the battleship Benedetto Brin relieved Amalfi's groups in blockade duty, allowing them to proceed to the east to join the main Italian fleet. Napoli, Amalfi, and Pisa were joined by the recently commissioned armored cruiser San Marco, three destroyers, and two torpedo boats. The group escorted several Italian transports that arrived off Derna on 15 October. After negotiations for a surrender of the town fell apart, Pisa shelled the barracks and a fort. There was no return fire from Derna, so a boat with offers of a truce was sent in. When it was greeted by a volley of rifle fire Amalfi and the other armored cruisers opened fire on the town with their 190-millimeter (7.5 in) guns and, according to a contemporary account, "completely destroyed" the town in 30 minutes time. A landing party dispatched at 14:00 was unable to reach the shore because of rough seas and gunfire from the shore. Amalfi and company then shelled the beach until 16:00. Weather conditions prevented a landing until the 18th, when 1,500 men took possession of the Derna.

On 13 April 1912, Amalfi sailed from Taranto as part of the Italian 1st Squadron, which consisted of the battleships Vittorio Emanuele (the squadron flagship), Roma, and Napoli; fellow armored cruisers Pisa, San Marco, and Vettor Pisani. The squadron was initially destined for Tripoli, but was diverted to the Aegean Sea to bombard the Turkish coast. The 2nd Squadron—consisting of battleships Regina Margherita (squadron flagship), Benedetto Brin, Ammiraglio di Saint Bon, and Emanuele Filiberto; and armored cruisers Francesco Ferrucio, Varese, and Giuseppe Garibaldi—sailed from Tobruk and Augusta at the same time. The two squadrons rendezvoused at Stampalia on 17 April. At 06:30, Pisa and Amalfi steamed into the Dardanelles in advance of the Italian fleet in an attempt to draw out the Turkish fleet. Four Turkish shore batteries, outfitted with 18 Krupp guns ranging from 8 to 11 inches (200 to 280 mm) in size fired on the Italian fleet. The Italians, firing at a range of 8,000 metres (8,700 yd), returned fire in an exchange that lasted more than two hours. Official Italian reports claimed that no ships were hit and specifically rebutted Turkish claims that Varese had been set on fire, but a summary in The New York Times reports that Varese was hit twice. On 19 April, the Italian fleet departed for home, but left Amalfi, Pisa, and an assortment of smaller craft to continue destroying telegraph stations and cutting cables.

One other action of note involving Amalfi occurred on 28 April when a party of 250 men recruited from her complement and that of Pisa took the Turkish garrison on the island of Astropalia. The 1912 Treaty of Lausanne that ended the war was signed on 18 October.

=== Interwar period ===
In the period between the end of the Italo-Turkish War in 1912 and Italy's entry into the First World War in 1915, Amalfi is mentioned in several news accounts that offer hints of her peace-time activities. In June 1913, Amalfi escorted King Victor Emmanuel III and his wife, Queen Elena, on the royal yacht Trinacria to the annual regatta at Kiel, Germany. While there, Victor Emmanuel met with Kaiser Wilhelm II, to discuss—it was speculated in a contemporary news report—the ongoing Balkan War. After departing from Kiel, Amalfi escorted the King and Queen on Trinacria to their next stop at Stockholm.

By November, Amalfi was back in Italian waters when Admiral Cattolica, the former Italian Minister of the Marine, and the captains of Amalfi and the battleship Emanuele Filiberto greeted United States Navy Admiral Charles J. Badger at Naples on his flagship, USS Wyoming. During the Wyoming's stay, one stop on the battleship's 1913 Mediterranean tour, Badger returned the visits and toured Amalfi as part of his courtesy calls.

=== First World War ===
At the outbreak of the First World War in August 1914, Italy declined to join its Triple Alliance partners Germany and Austria-Hungary when they declared war against the Entente Powers, opting instead to remain neutral. Pressure from the United Kingdom and France swayed Italy to sign the secret Treaty of London on 26 April 1915. In the agreement, Italy promised to leave the Triple Alliance and declare war against its former allies within a month in return for territorial gains after the end of the war.

At the beginning of May, Amalfi was part of the squadron headquartered at Brindisi that included six pre-dreadnought battleships—Regina Elena, Vittorio Emanuele, Roma, Napoli, Benedetto Brin, and Ammiraglio di Saint Bon—and four armored cruisers—Pisa, San Marco, San Giorgio, and Amalfi herself.

After Italy's declaration of war against Austria-Hungary on 23 May, Admiral Anton Haus, the fleet commander of the Austro-Hungarian Navy sortied his fleet to bombard the Italian coast on the night of 23/24 May in an attempt to disrupt the Italian mobilization. Of the many targets, Ancona was hardest hit, with disruptions to the town's gas, electric, and telephone service; the city's stockpiles of coal and oil were left in flames. All of the Austrian ships safely returned to port, making it seem that they had been able to attack with impunity, putting political pressure on the Regia Marina from Rome. When the Austrians resumed attacks on the Italian coast in mid-June, Italian Admiral Paolo Thaon di Revel responded by sending Amalfi and the other armored cruisers at Brindisi—the navy's newest—to Venice to supplement the older ships already there. Historian Lawrence Sondhaus argues that the arrival of the four fast armored cruisers in Venice should have been a major deterrent against future Austrian coastal raids, but concedes that they ended up becoming more inviting targets for Austrian U-boats instead.

=== Sinking ===
Shortly after the arrival of the quartet of cruisers at Venice, Amalfi participated in a "reconnaissance in force" mission near the Austro-Hungarian port of Pula on the night of 6/7 July 1915. After completion of the mission, the cruiser was about 20 nautical miles (37 km; 23 mi) from Venice when she was torpedoed by the Austrian submarine U-26 at dawn on 7 July. U-26—in actuality the German submarine UB-14, marked as an Austrian vessel and flying the Austrian flag since Italy and Germany were not at war—was under the command of Oberleutnant zur See Heino von Heimburg, and on her first patrol.

Amalfi immediately began listing to port and, after initial damage control efforts proved fruitless, her commander ordered the ship evacuated. The cruiser sank less than 30 minutes after she was torpedoed. Distress calls were answered by other ships of the division which rescued a large number of the ship's complement. The loss of men was reported as about 200 at the time, but later accounts list only 67 fatalities. Amalfi was among the largest ships sunk by U-boats during the war. As a result of Amalfi's sinking, sister ship Pisa and the other pair of armored cruisers at Venice rarely ventured out of port for most of the next year, and were eventually transferred to Valona in April 1916.

== Bibliography ==
- Beehler, William Henry (1913). The History of the Italian-Turkish War, Sept. 29, 1911 to Oct. 18, 1912. Annapolis, Maryland: Advertiser-Republican. OCLC 63576798.
- Fraccaroli, Aldo (1970). Italian Warships of World War I. London: Ian Allan. ISBN 0-7110-0105-7.
- Gardiner, Robert & Gray, Randal, eds. (1985). Conway's All the World's Fighting Ships 1906–1921. Annapolis: Naval Institute Press. ISBN 0-87021-907-3.
- Silverstone, Paul H. (1984). Directory of the World's Capital Ships. New York: Hippocrene Books. ISBN 0-88254-979-0.
- Sondhaus, Lawrence (1994). The Naval Policy of Austria-Hungary, 1867–1918: Navalism, Industrial Development, and the Politics of Dualism. West Lafayette, Indiana: Purdue University Press. ISBN 978-1-55753-034-9. OCLC 59919233.
- Stern, Robert Cecil (2007). The Hunter Hunted: Submarine Versus Submarine: Encounters from World War I to the Present. Annapolis, Maryland: Naval Institute Press. ISBN 978-1-59114-379-6. OCLC 123127537.
