= Pisa-class cruiser =

Pisa class of three armored cruisers built

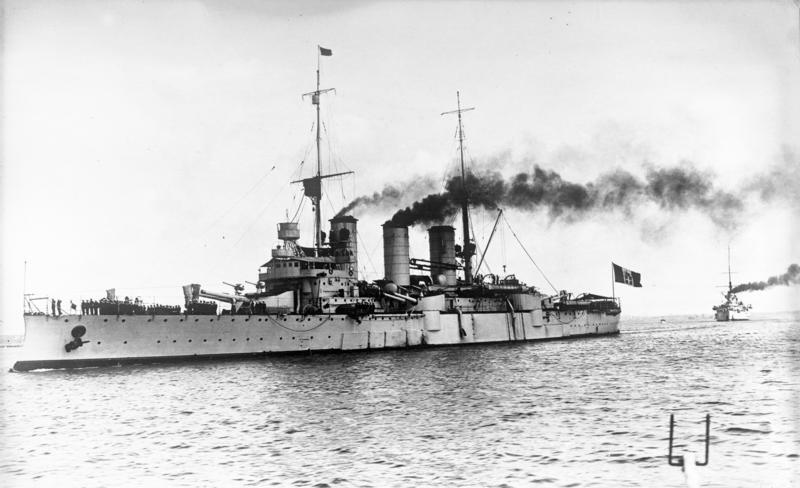
- Pisa in February 1932, showing the foremast added in the 1920s

Class overview
- Name: Pisa
- Builders: Cantiere navale fratelli Orlando; Cantieri navali Odero
- Operators: Regia Marina; Royal Hellenic Navy
- Preceded by: Giuseppe Garibaldi class
- Succeeded by: San Giorgio class
- Subclasses: Georgios Averof
- Built: 1905–1909
- In commission: 1909–1952
- Completed: 3
- Lost: 1
- Scrapped: 1
- Preserved: 1

General characteristics
- Type: Armored cruiser
- Displacement: 9,832 t (9,677 long tons)
- Length: 140.5 m (460 ft 11 in) (o/a)
- Beam: 21 m (68 ft 11 in)
- Draft: 6.9–7.1 m (22 ft 8 in – 23 ft 4 in)
- Installed power: 20,000 ihp (15,000 kW); 22 Belleville boilers
- Propulsion: 2 shafts, 2 vertical triple-expansion steam engines
- Speed: 23 knots (43 km/h; 26 mph)
- Range: 2,500 nmi (4,600 km; 2,900 mi) at 12 knots (22 km/h; 14 mph)
- Complement: 32 officers, 652–55 enlisted men
- Armament: 2 × twin 254 mm (10.0 in) guns or 234 mm (9.2 in) guns; 4 × twin 190 mm (7.5 in) guns; 16 × single 76 mm (3.0 in) guns; 8 × or 4 × single 47 mm (1.9 in) guns; 3 × 450 mm (17.7 in) torpedo tubes
- Armor: Belt: 200 mm (8 in); Gun turrets: 140–160 mm (6–6 in); Deck: 51 mm (2.0 in); Conning tower: 180 mm (7 in)

The Pisa class consisted of three armored cruisers built in Italy in the first decade of the 20th century. Two of these were for the Royal Italian Navy (Regia Marina) and the third was sold to the Royal Hellenic Navy and named Georgios Averof. This ship served as the Greek flagship for the bulk of her active career and participated in the Balkan Wars of 1912–1913, fighting in two battles against the Ottoman Navy. She played a minor role in World War II after escaping from Greece during the German invasion in early 1941. Influenced by communist agitators, her crew mutinied in 1944, but it was suppressed without any bloodshed. Georgios Averof returned to Greece after the German evacuation in late 1944 and became a museum ship in 1952. She is the only surviving armored cruiser in the world.

The two Italian ships participated in the Italo-Turkish War of 1911–1912 during which they supported ground forces in Libya with naval gunfire and helped to occupy towns in Libya and islands in the Dodecanese. They played a minor role in World War I after a submarine sank Amalfi shortly after Italy joined the war in 1915. Her sister ship, Pisa, became a training ship after the war and was broken up for scrap in 1937.

== Design and description ==
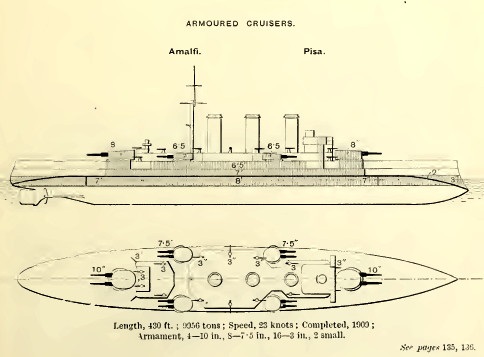
Right elevation and plan drawings from Brassey's Naval Annual 1915

The Pisa class was designed in 1904 by Italian engineer Giuseppe Orlando, who attempted to replicate on a smaller scale the armament and armor of the Regina Elena-class battleships then entering the service of the Regia Marina. The Italians classified large armored cruisers like the Pisas as second-class battleships. For ships of their displacement, they were considered to have been heavily armed, but inferior to battlecruisers, a type introduced during their lengthy construction time.

The Pisa-class ships had a length between perpendiculars of 130 meters (426 ft 6 in) and an overall length of 140.5 meters (460 ft 11 in). They had a beam of 21 meters (68 ft 11 in) and a draft of 7.1 meters (23 ft 4 in). The ships displaced 9,832 metric tons (9,677 long tons) at normal load, and 10,401–10,600 metric tons (10,237–10,433 long tons) at deep load. The Pisa class had a complement of 32 officers and 652 to 655 enlisted men.

=== Propulsion ===
The ships were powered by two vertical triple-expansion steam engines, each driving one propeller shaft using steam supplied by 22 Belleville boilers. Designed for a maximum output of 20,000 indicated horsepower (15,000 kW) and a speed of 22.5 knots (41.7 km/h; 25.9 mph), both ships handily exceeded this, reaching speeds of 23.47–23.6 knots (43.47–43.71 km/h; 27.01–27.16 mph) during their sea trials from 20,260–20,808 ihp (15,108–15,517 kW). They had a cruising range of about 2,500 nautical miles (4,600 km; 2,900 mi) at a speed of 12 knots (22 km/h; 14 mph) and 1,400 nautical miles (2,600 km; 1,600 mi) at a speed of 21 knots (39 km/h; 24 mph).

=== Armament ===
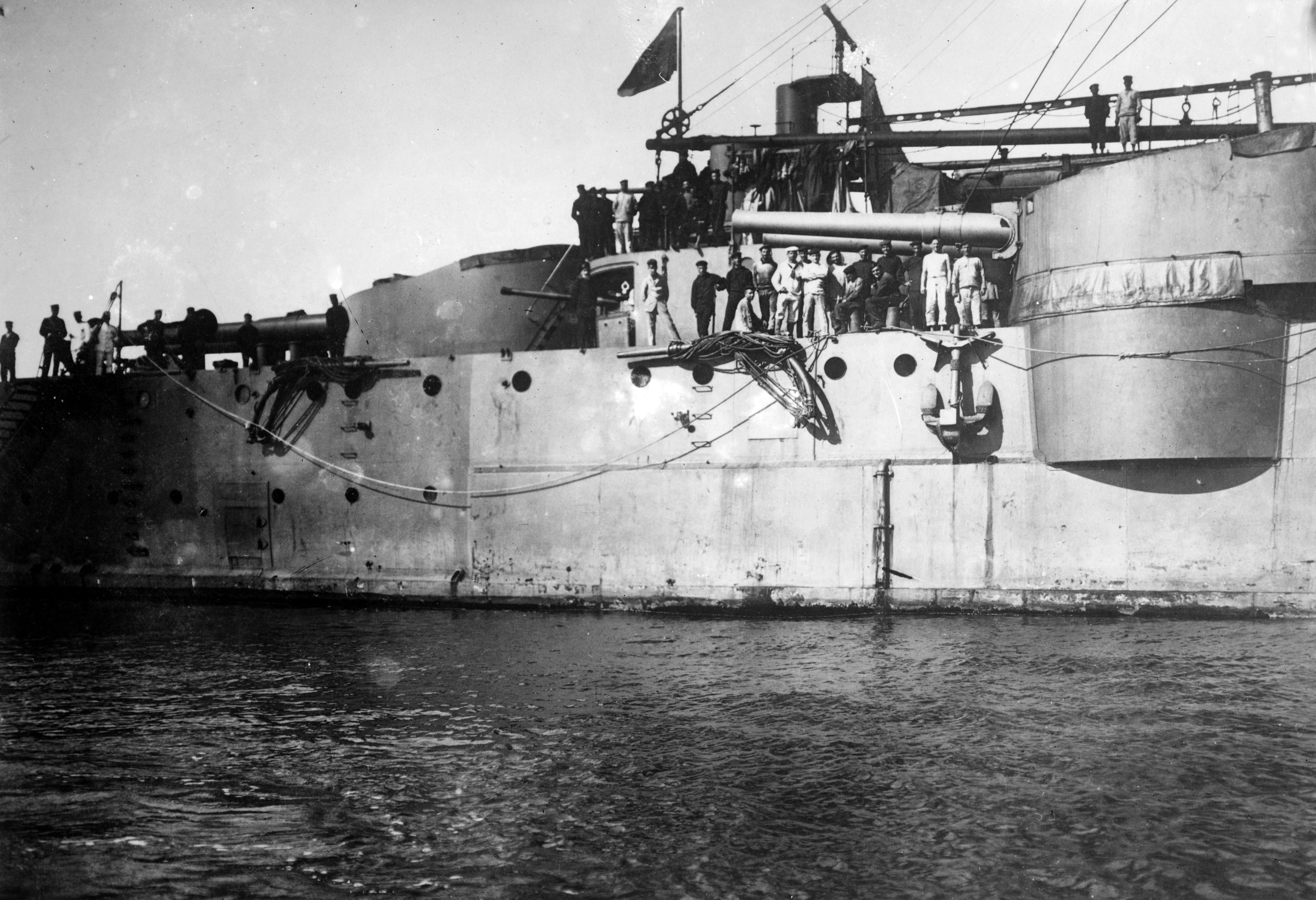
A view of Pisa's aft superstructure and gun turrets, probably around 1912. The leftmost turret is her rear main gun turret while the right one is one of her secondary turrets.

The main armament of the two Italian Pisa-class ships consisted of four Cannone da 254/45 V Modello 1906 (Note: The /45 denotes the length of the gun barrels; in this case, the gun is 45 caliber, meaning that the gun is 45 times long as it is in diameter.) guns in hydraulically powered, twin-gun turrets fore and aft of the superstructure. The 254 mm (10.0 in) gun fired 217–224-kilogram (478–494 lb) armor-piercing (AP) projectiles at a muzzle velocity of 869 meters per second (2,850 ft/s). The Royal Hellenic Navy preferred smaller 234 mm (9.2 in) guns purchased from Britain for Georgios Averof, but the ship was otherwise armed nearly identically to her half-sisters. The 380-pound (170 kg) shell of the Elswick Pattern 'H' gun was fired at a muzzle velocity of 2,770 feet per second (840 m/s).

The Italian ships mounted eight Cannone da 190/45 V Modello 1906 in four hydraulically powered twin-gun turrets, two in each side amidships, as their secondary armament. These Vickers 190 mm (7.5 in) guns fired 91-kilogram (201 lb) AP shells at 850–870 m/s (2,789–2,853 ft/s). The Elswick Pattern 'B' 7.5-inch guns aboard Georgios Averof used 90.7-kilogram (200 lb) AP shells which were fired at muzzle velocities of 844 m/s (2,770 ft/s).

For defense against torpedo boats, all three ships mounted 16 Vickers quick-firing (QF) Cannone da 76/50 V Modello 1908 guns. This gun fired a 6.5-kilogram (14 lb) projectile at a muzzle velocity of 930 meters per second (3,100 ft/s). The ships were also fitted with eight (Pisa and Amalfi) or four (Georgios Averof) QF Cannone da 47/40 V Modello 1908 guns. The two Italian ships were equipped with three submerged 450 mm (17.7 in) torpedo tubes while those of Georgios Averof were 457 mm (18.0 in) in diameter.

During World War I, Pisa's 76 and 47 mm guns were replaced by twenty 76/40 guns; six of these were anti-aircraft (AA) guns while Georgios Averof received one additional 76 mm AA gun. During her 1925 refit, the latter ship had her light armament changed to four 76 mm low-angle guns, two 76 mm AA guns, four 47 mm low-angle guns and five 40 mm AA guns.

=== Protection ===
All three ships were protected by an armored belt that was 200 mm (7.9 in) thick amidships and reduced to 90 mm (3.5 in) at the bow and stern. The armored deck was 51 mm (2.0 in) thick. The conning tower armor was 180 mm (7.1 in) thick. The 254 mm gun turrets were protected by 160 mm (6.3 in) of armour while the 190 mm turrets had 140 mm (5.5 in).

== Ships ==
Construction data
Name	Builder	Laid down	Launched	Completed	Fate
Pisa	Orlando, Livorno	20 February 1905	15 September 1907	1 September 1909	Discarded, 28 April 1937
Amalfi	Odero, Genoa-Sestri Ponente	24 July 1905	5 May 1908	1 September 1909	Sunk, 7 July 1915
Georgios Averof	Orlando, Livorno	1907	12 March 1910	16 May 1911	Training accommodation ship, Poros Island, 1952–1983 Museum ship, 1984

== Careers ==
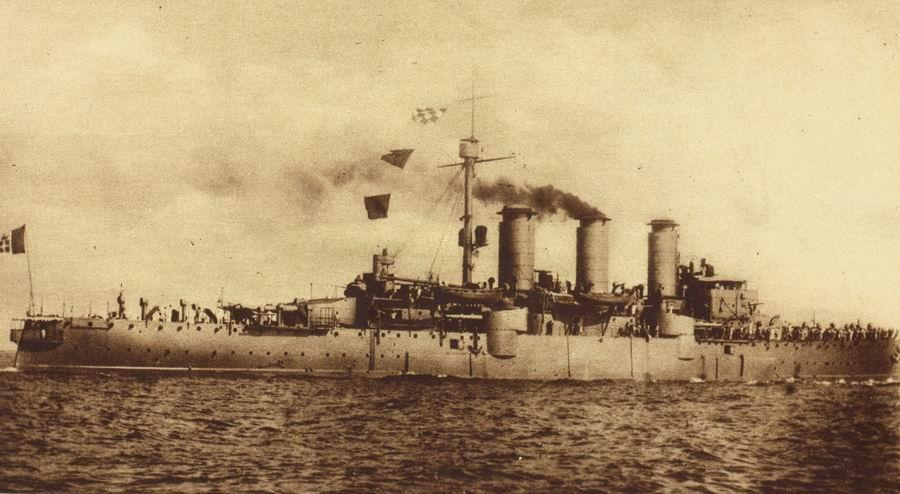
Amalfi underway at slow speed

Two of the three Pisa-class armored cruisers were originally built for the Regia Marina. The third ship was built on speculation and was sold to Greece and completed as Georgios Averof, named after a wealthy Greek businessman who had left a sizeable legacy for the increase of the Greek Navy in his will. The ship participated in the Coronation Fleet Review for King George V of the United Kingdom in 1911 shortly after commissioning. She served in the Balkan Wars and was instrumental in the Greek victories over the Ottoman Empire in the Battles of Elli and Lemnos during the First Balkan War. During World War I, Georgios Averof did not see much active service, as Greece was neutral during the first years of the war. After the Noemvriana riots of 1916, she was seized by the French to ensure that she could do nothing against the Entente. After the war's end, the ship participated in the Greco-Turkish War of 1919–1922 and helped in the evacuation of the refugees after the Greek Army's defeat. In 1925–1927 Georgios Averof was reconstructed in France and rearmed.

The ship was seized by rebels during the failed 1935 Greek coup d'état attempt and was present at the 1935 Silver Jubilee Fleet Review for King George V. During World War II, the ship escaped to Egypt after the Allied defense began to collapse in 1941 during the Battle of Greece. She performed convoy escort and patrolling duties in the Indian Ocean until the end of 1942. Her crew mutinied in early 1944 under the influence of communist sympathizers of the National Liberation Front. The mutiny was suppressed and she ferried the Greek government-in-exile to Athens in late 1944. She was decommissioned in 1952 and is now preserved as a museum ship in Faliron Bay near Athens. Georgios Averof is the only armored cruiser still in existence.

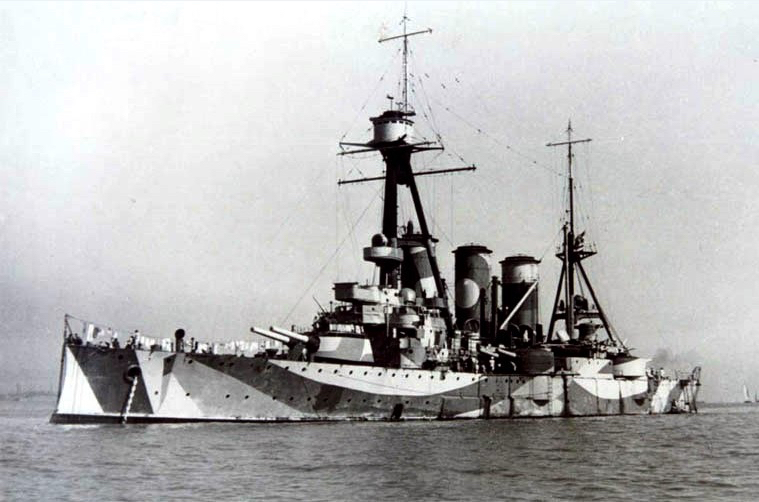
The camouflaged Georgios Averof, RN Bombay Station, 1942, while serving under Royal Navy command

Pisa and Amalfi both participated in the Italo-Turkish War of 1911–1912, during which Pisa supported the occupations of Tobruk, Libya and several islands in the Dodecanese while Amalfi briefly blockaded Tripoli and supported the occupation of Derna, Libya. The sisters came together in 1912 and they bombarded the fortifications defending the entrance to the Dardanelles in July. After the end of the war, Amalfi escorted the Italian king and queen on the royal yacht to Germany and Sweden during a 1913 visit.

After Amalfi was sunk by the submarine U-26 (actually the Imperial German submarine SM UB-14 flying the Austro-Hungarian flag) on 7 July 1915, Pisa's activities were limited by the threat of submarine attack, although the ship did participate in the bombardment of Durazzo, Albania in late 1918. After the war she became a training ship and was stricken from the Navy List in 1937 before being scrapped.
