= EOC 10-inch 45-calibre naval gun =

EOC 10 inch 45-calibre naval gun
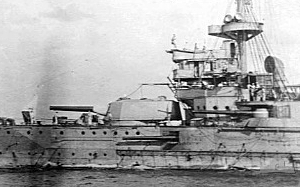
- Forward 10-inch turret of HMS Swiftsure
- Type: Naval gun
- Place of origin: United Kingdom

Service history
- In service: 1904–45
- Used by: Italy; Japan; United Kingdom
- Wars: World War I World War II

Production history
- Designer: Elswick Ordnance Company

Specifications
- Mass: 34.5 tons
- Barrel length: 37 ft 6 in (11.430 m) (45 cal)
- Shell: 500 pounds (227 kg)
- Calibre: 10 inches (254 mm)
- Elevation: -5° to +25°
- Muzzle velocity: UK : 2,625 ft/s (800 m/s); Italy: 850 m/s (2,800 ft/s)
- Maximum firing range: UK : 18,850 yd (17,240 m); Italy : 25,000 m (27,000 yd) @ 25°

The EOC 10-inch 45 calibre gun were various similar 10-inch naval guns designed and manufactured by Elswick Ordnance Company to equip ships they built and/or armed for several countries before World War I.

== History ==
=== Italian service ===
Elswick supplied later, more powerful "Pattern W" models of its 10-inch 45-calibre guns for the San Giorgio-class armoured cruisers. In Italian service these were known as the Cannone da 254/45 A Modello 1906.

=== Japanese service ===
The Katori-class battleship Kashima had a secondary armament of four single-gun turrets positioned on each side of the ships superstructure. In Japanese service these guns were known as 10-inch/45 Type 41 naval guns.

=== UK service ===
Elswick supplied 5 of their 10-inch 45-calibre guns for use on the battleship Constitución that they were building for Chile. Britain took the ship over in 1903 as HMS Swiftsure, and the guns were designated BL 10 inch Mk VI in UK service. These guns fired a 500-pound (227 kg) projectile using 146 pounds 12 ounces (66.6 kg) of cordite MD propellant.

== See also ==
- List of naval guns
- Vickers 10-inch 45-calibre naval gun : Vickers equivalent
