= Amagi =

Amagi may refer to:

- Amagi, Fukuoka, a former city in Japan
- Amagi, Kagoshima, a town in Japan
- Mount Amagi, a range of volcanic mountains in Shizuoka Prefecture, Japan
- Ama-gi, an ancient Sumerian word and teaching

== Transportation ==
- Amagi Line (disambiguation), two Japanese railways
- Amagi Station, a railway station in Fukuoka Prefecture, Japan

== Military ==
- Japanese corvette Amagi, an early vessel of the Imperial Japanese Navy
- Amagi-class battlecruiser, a vessel in the Imperial Japanese Navy, sister ship of Akagi
- Japanese aircraft carrier Amagi, World War II

== People ==
- Seimaru Amagi, pen name for manga storywriter Shin Kibayashi
- Shūsuke Amagi, light novel writer for Chrome Shelled Regios
- The Amagi (Ethan Schulteis), American YouTuber and entrepreneur

=== Fictional characters ===
- Yukiko Amagi, from the video game series Persona 4
- Kouga Amagi, Konoha Amagi, and other Amagi family members from the manga and anime series Zetman
- Saika Amagi, from the video game .hack//Link
- Yuki Amagi, from the manga and anime series Legendz
- Hiiro Amagi and Rinne Amagi, singers from the franchise Ensemble Stars!
- Amagi, an AI maid robot from I'm the Evil Lord of an Intergalactic Empire!
- Amagi, from Crayon Shin-chan: Fierceness That Invites Storm! Yakiniku Road of Honor

== Other uses ==
- Amagi Brilliant Park, a Japanese light novel series
- "Amagi-goe", song by Sayuri Ishikawa

== See also ==
- 天城 (disambiguation)
- Amaki
