= Japanese ship Amagi =

Three naval vessels of Japan have been named Amagi:

- Japanese corvette Amagi, an early vessel of the Imperial Japanese Navy
- Amagi-class battlecruiser, a vessel in the Imperial Japanese Navy, sister ship of Akagi
- Japanese aircraft carrier Amagi, an Unryū-class aircraft carrier of the Imperial Japanese Navy during World War II
