= 天城 =

天城 may refer to:

- Amagi (disambiguation), Japanese place name and surname
- Amaki, Japanese surname
- Tiancheng (disambiguation)
