= Japanese ship Aso =

At least two warships of Japan have borne the name Aso:

- Japanese cruiser Aso launched as the Russian cruiser Bayan in 1900 she renamed after being captured by Japan in 1905. She was struck in 1930 and expended as a target in 1932.
- Japanese aircraft carrier Aso, an Unryū-class aircraft carrier launched in 1944 but never completed. She was expended as a target in 1945.
