= Wang Jun Yi =

Wang Jun Yi (Chinese: 王俊懿; born 1974) is a contemporary Chinese jade sculptor and carving master who was awarded the title of “Chinese Jade Carving Master” in 2006. He is known for incorporating gold, silver and titanium alloy into jade.

His works have featured at the Louvre, the National Museum of China, the 2010 Beijing Jewellery Show, the Art Institute of Tsinghua and have been the subject of significant auctions at auction houses such as Christie's and Tian Cheng International.

== Life and career ==
Wang was born in 1974 in Guilin in the Guangxi Zhuang Autonomous Region. He graduated from a jewellery art school at the age of 16 and began sculpting jade around the age of 19.

In 2011, Wang worked with Italian designer Fulvio Maria Scavia to incorporate jade into European jewellery.

In 2012, Wang was the first jade artist to open a solo exhibition at the National Museum of China.

In October 2014, Wang embarked on an international tour which included a special exhibition of 50 of Wang's jadeite artworks at the Louvre from 30 October to 3 November 2014. His works featured as part of a promotion of diplomatic relations and culture between China and France.

== Jade-carving philosophy and style ==
Wang's aim is to give jade a new look, popularity and appeal by challenging the norms of jade art which, for example, have tended to incorporate traditional elements such as the Chinese zodiac.

Wang's emphasis lies not on how good a material jade is, but on how one might achieve better artistic design with jade.

Wang attributes his emotional connection with jade to the fact that, when Wang was a child, his mother would hide her jade bracelet from Wang by keeping it locked in a drawer. This caused Wang to believe that jade was 'mysterious and forbidden'. This, he says, created in him a hope that one day he would be able to play freely with jade.

== Notable jade works ==
Some of Wang's signature works include:

- Ice Butterflies, a combination of 13 jade pieces resembling butterflies and melting ice.
- Transforming into Butterfly, a butterfly held together by metal threads.
- The Nile, used for the Louvre exhibition as it resembled the pyramid shape of the museum.
- The Unlimited Power of Buddhism, a one-meter tall work that combined jade with titanium.
- "A carved jadeite praying mantis, agate and diamond clip brooch" described by Christie's as a 'very personal interpretation of a universe of taotie masks, dragon and phoenix, salamander and bats emerging from the contrasting qualities and tones of the raw materials' which sold for US$24,799 on 1 June 2005.
- "Icy lavender jadeite 'miniature buddha' and diamond pendent necklace"

Wang has also announced his intention to make 200 jade butterflies to represent all the countries in the world.
