= Suragi =

Suragi may refer to

- the autobiography of U. R. Ananthamurthy
- the house of U. R. Ananthamurthy
- the Japanese aircraft carrier Katsuragi
