= Attacks on Kure and the Seto Inland Sea =

Naval battle of World War II

Attacks on Kure and the Inland Sea
- Part of the Pacific theatre of World War II
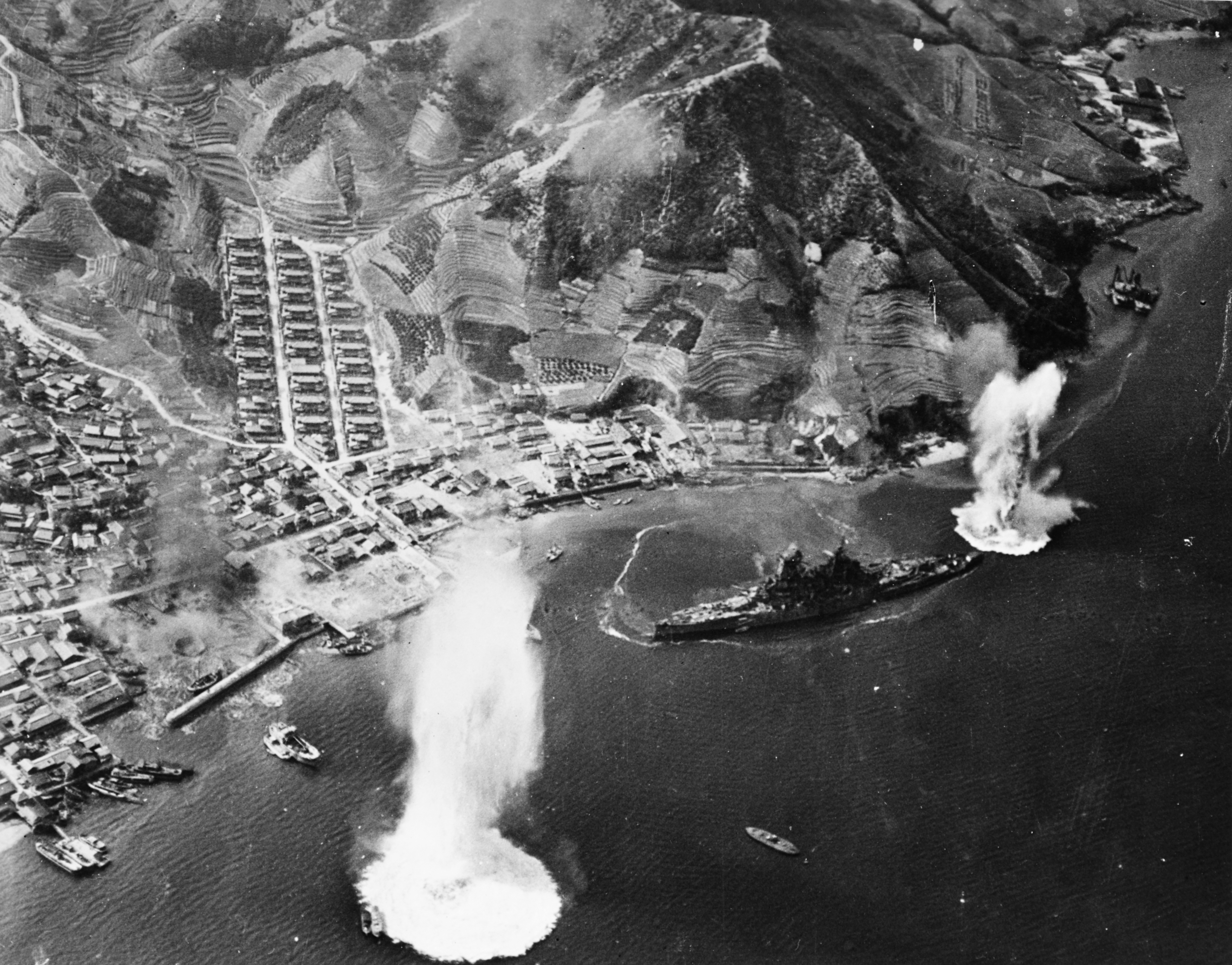
- Japanese battleship Haruna under attack on 28 July
Date	24–28 July 1945
Location	Kure and Seto Inland Sea, Japan 34.23°N 132.55°E
Result	Allied victory

Belligerents
United States; United Kingdom	Japan

Commanders and leaders
William Halsey	Kanazawa Masao

Units involved
Third Fleet: Task Force 37; Task Force 38	Combined Fleet

Casualties and losses
102 killed 133 aircraft destroyed	1 fleet carrier sunk 3 battleships sunk 1 ex-battleship sunk 2 heavy cruisers sunk 1 light cruiser sunk 2 armored cruisers sunk 1 destroyer sunk 2 escort ships sunk 1 escort carrier grounded 1 fleet carrier heavily damaged 306 aircraft destroyed 392 aircraft damaged

The attacks on Kure and the Inland Sea were a series of large-scale air raids by United States and British naval aircraft in late July 1945 that sank most of the surviving large warships of the Imperial Japanese Navy (IJN). The United States Third Fleet's attacks on Kure Naval Arsenal and nearby ports on 24, 25, and 28 July sank an aircraft carrier, three battleships, five cruisers, and several smaller warships. During the same period the British Pacific Fleet attacked other targets in the Inland Sea region and sank two escort ships and several smaller vessels as well as damaging an escort carrier.

== Prelude ==
In July 1945 the IJN's remaining large warships were concentrated near the major naval base of Kure. The ships were immobilized by fuel shortages and were being used only as stationary anti-aircraft batteries. Admiral John S. McCain Sr., the commander of the Fast Carrier Task Force, strongly opposed attacking Kure as he and his staff believed that the ships only posed a minor threat.

In his memoirs Admiral Halsey gave four reasons for why he attacked Kure despite McCain's objections. First, he believed that the attack would boost US morale and retaliate for the attack on Pearl Harbor in December 1941. Second, it would ensure that the Japanese could not disrupt the planned Soviet invasion of Hokkaido. Third, it would prevent Japan from using its fleet as a bargaining point to secure better peace terms. Finally, he had been ordered to conduct the attack by his superior officer, Fleet Admiral Chester W. Nimitz.

Despite operating as a task group of the US Third Fleet, the British Pacific Fleet (BPF) was excluded from the attack on Kure because the Americans did not want Britain to claim a part in destroying the Japanese fleet. The BPF was instead used to attack airfields and the port of Osaka.

Kure had been subjected to several major attacks prior to July 1945. On 19 March 1945, 321 US Navy aircraft attacked Japanese warships in and around the city. This attack was unsuccessful, with no Japanese ships being sunk, though an escort carrier and a light cruiser were badly damaged. On 5 May B-29 Superfortress bombers of the United States Army Air Forces (USAAF) successfully bombed the Hiro Naval Aircraft Factory. B-29s laid naval mines in the approaches to the port on 30 March and 5 May, and 40 percent of the city was destroyed in a major air raid conducted by Superfortresses on 1 July.

Participating in the attacks were Task Force 38 for the Americans and Task Force 37 for the British. Task Force 37 included the aircraft carriers HMS Formidable, Indefatigable, and Victorious.

== Battle ==
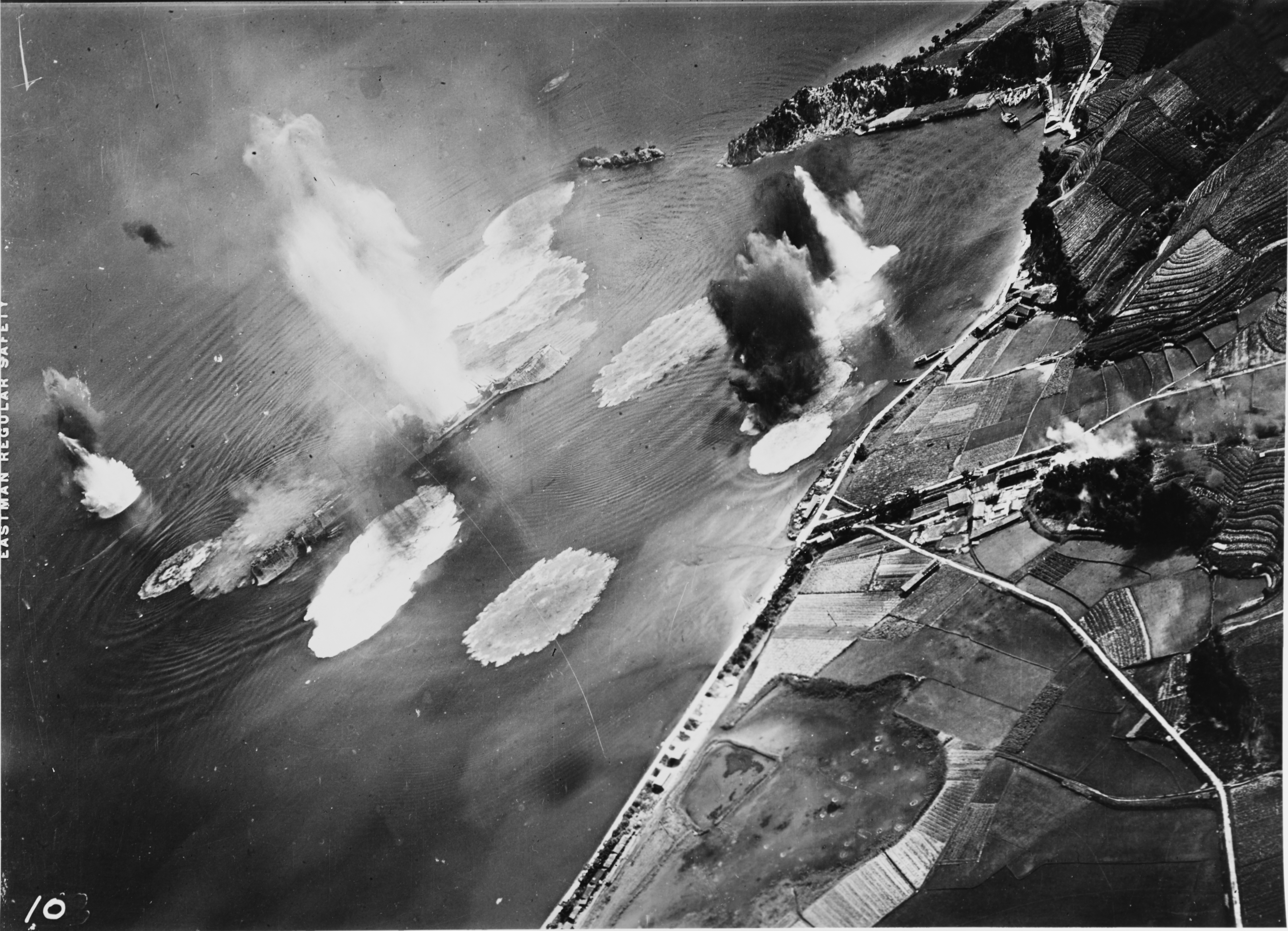
Tone under intense aerial attack by aircraft of USS Shangri-La, 24 July

The Third Fleet's attack against Kure began on 24 July. US carrier aircraft flew 1,747 sorties on this day against Japanese targets. The attacks sank the aircraft carrier Amagi and the cruiser Ōyodo, which was acting as the Combined Fleet's flagship. The battleships Hyūga, Ise, and Haruna, the heavy cruisers Tone and Aoba, the outdated armored training cruisers Iwate and Izumo and the ex-battleship turned target ship Settsu were all heavily damaged and settled in shallow water. The shallow anchorage precluded the use of torpedoes. The US aircraft attempted to reduce their losses from the large number of anti-aircraft guns in the area by the use of variable time-fused bombs.

The British Pacific Fleet conducted a number of attacks against Osaka and targeted the Inland Sea. As a result the escort carrier Kaiyō was severely damaged and grounded, the escort ships No. 4 and No. 30 were also sunk for the loss of four aircraft.

The upper hangar deck of Katsuragi, October 1945, after it was struck by a 2,000 lb bomb on 28 July

US strikes against Kure resumed on 28 July, further damaging the battleships Ise and Haruna and the heavy cruiser Aoba. The aircraft carrier Katsuragi which had largely escaped attack in the earlier raid, and the unserviceable light aircraft carrier Ryūhō were attacked, with Katsuragi suffering heavy damage. These air strikes were among the largest conducted by the US Navy during the war, and were the most destructive of shipping.

On 28 July, the USAAF attacked Kure ships with 79 B-24 Liberator bombers from Okinawa. Four bomb hits were made upon the beached cruiser Aoba, breaking off her stern. Two B-24s were shot down and 14 others damaged.

Allied losses included 102 aircrew and 133 planes lost in combat or accidents during the attacks. These losses were higher than those suffered by the Third Fleet in most of its operations, and were the result of the heavy anti-aircraft defences around Kure.

== Aftermath ==
The Allied attacks on Kure and the inland sea left Nagato at Yokosuka as the only remaining operational capital ship in Japan's inventory. The destruction of the battleships and heavy cruisers at Kure was seen by British official historian Stephen Roskill as avenging the losses suffered by the United States at Pearl Harbor. The attacks allowed the Soviet Pacific Fleet to operate in the Sea of Japan without fear of attack by Japanese ships.

=== Warships sunk or damaged ===
==== Battleships ====
- Haruna: Hit by a single bomb which caused light damage on 24 July, hit by eight bombs on 28 July, sunk at her moorings.
- Hyūga: Hit by ten bombs on 24 July, sunk in shallow waters.
- Ise: Damaged by bombs in an attack by 60 planes on 24 July, struck by sixteen bombs on 28 July, sunk in shallow waters.

==== Aircraft carriers ====
Damaged and inoperable Ryūhō anchored at Kure, 1945

- Amagi: Hit by two bombs and received several near-misses on 24 July, hit several more times on 28 July, capsized.
- Katsuragi: Hit by one bomb on 24 July which did little damage. Hit by one 2,000-pound bomb on 28 July which blew a large hole in the flight deck, moderately damaged.
- Hōshō: Slightly damaged by a single bomb or aerial rocket hit on 24 July.
- Ryūhō: Already severely damaged in the March air raid on Kure, attacked again on 24 and 28 July but remained afloat.

==== Cruisers ====
- Iwate: Not hit by any bombs, but three near misses on 24 July caused Iwate to sink in shallow water the following day.
- Izumo: Not hit by any bombs, but three near misses on 28 July caused Izumo to capsize.
- Aoba: Bombed and sunk on 24 July, hit by four more bombs and caught fire on 28 July.
- Tone: Hit by three bombs and sunk on 24 July, attacked again on 28 July by rockets and bombs.
- Kitakami: Damaged by strafing on 24 July.
- Ōyodo: Strafed and hit by five bombs on 24 July, near-missed by bombs on 28 July and capsized.
- Yakumo: Damaged and re-designated as a transport ship.

==== Destroyers ====
- Yoizuki: Slightly damaged on 24 July.
- Nashi: Sunk on 28 July 1945.
- Kaba: Damaged on 24 July.
- Asagao: Damaged on 28 July.

==== Unfinished ships ====
- Aso: Unryū-class aircraft carrier, attacked on 24 July, caught fire.
- I-404: I-400-class submarine, severely damaged on 28 July, scuttled.

==== Warships attacked outside of Kure Naval Port ====
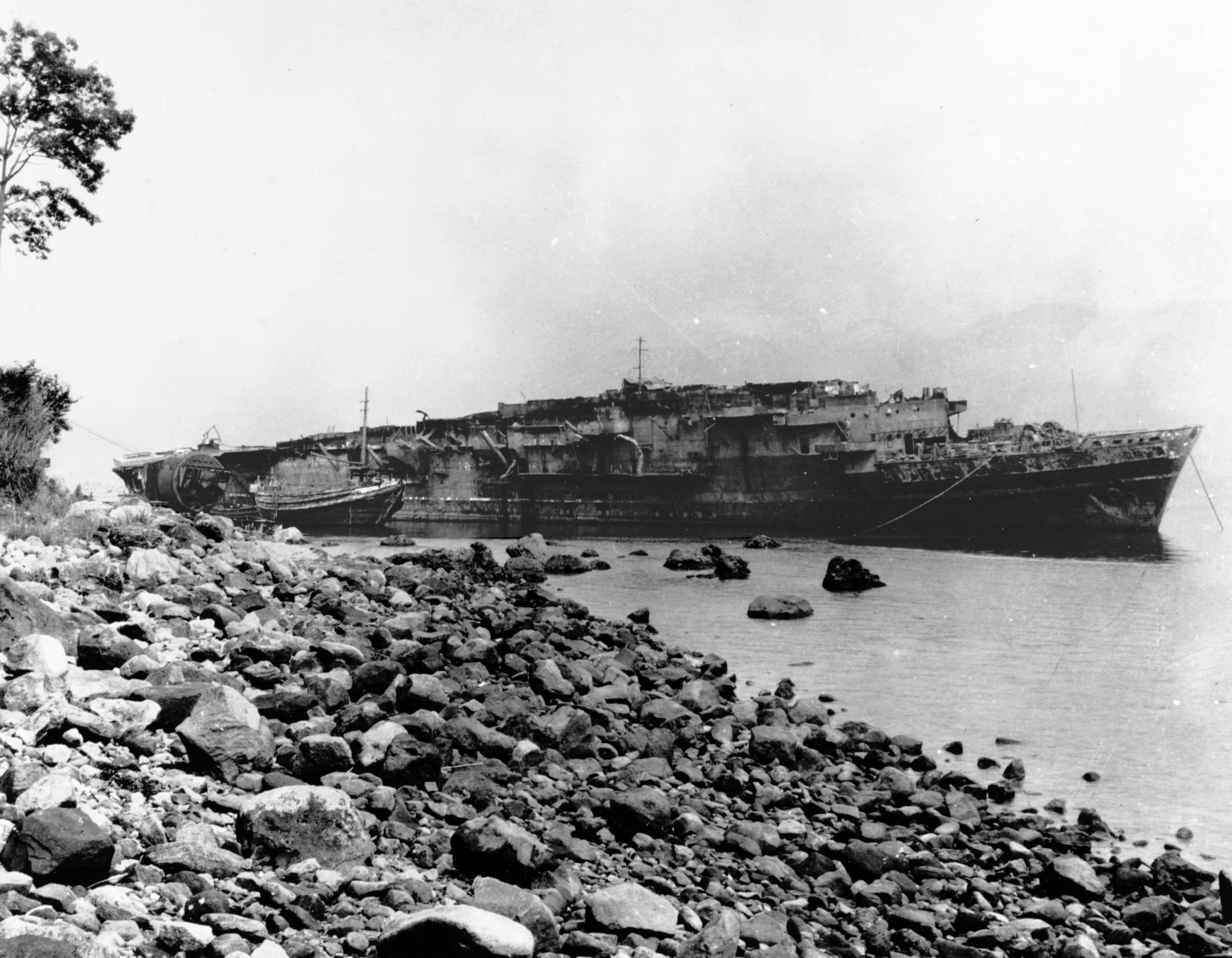
Grounded hulk of Kaiyō being scrapped in Beppu Bay, 1946–1947

- Settsu: Ex-battleship, grounded after one bomb hit and five near-misses on 24 July, hit by two bombs on 28 July. (Hiroshima Bay, Etajimacho Ozu)
- Kaiyō: Escort carrier, attacked on 24 and 28 July, damaged and grounded. (Beppu Bay, Ōita)
- Komahashi: Submarine tender, attacked on 27 July and sunk in shallow water. (Owase Port, Mie)
- I-205: Unfinished I-201-class submarine, sunk on 28 July. (Kurahashi Island)
- Hagi: Matsu-class destroyer, damaged on 28 July. (south of Iwaishima, Yamaguchi)
- Tsubaki: Moderately damaged on 24 July. (off the coast of Okayama)
- Escort ship No. 4: Sunk on 28 July. (off the coast of Toba, Mie)
- Escort ship No. 30: Sunk on 28 July. (off the coast of Yura, Wakayama)

=== Gallery of major warships sunk in the attack ===
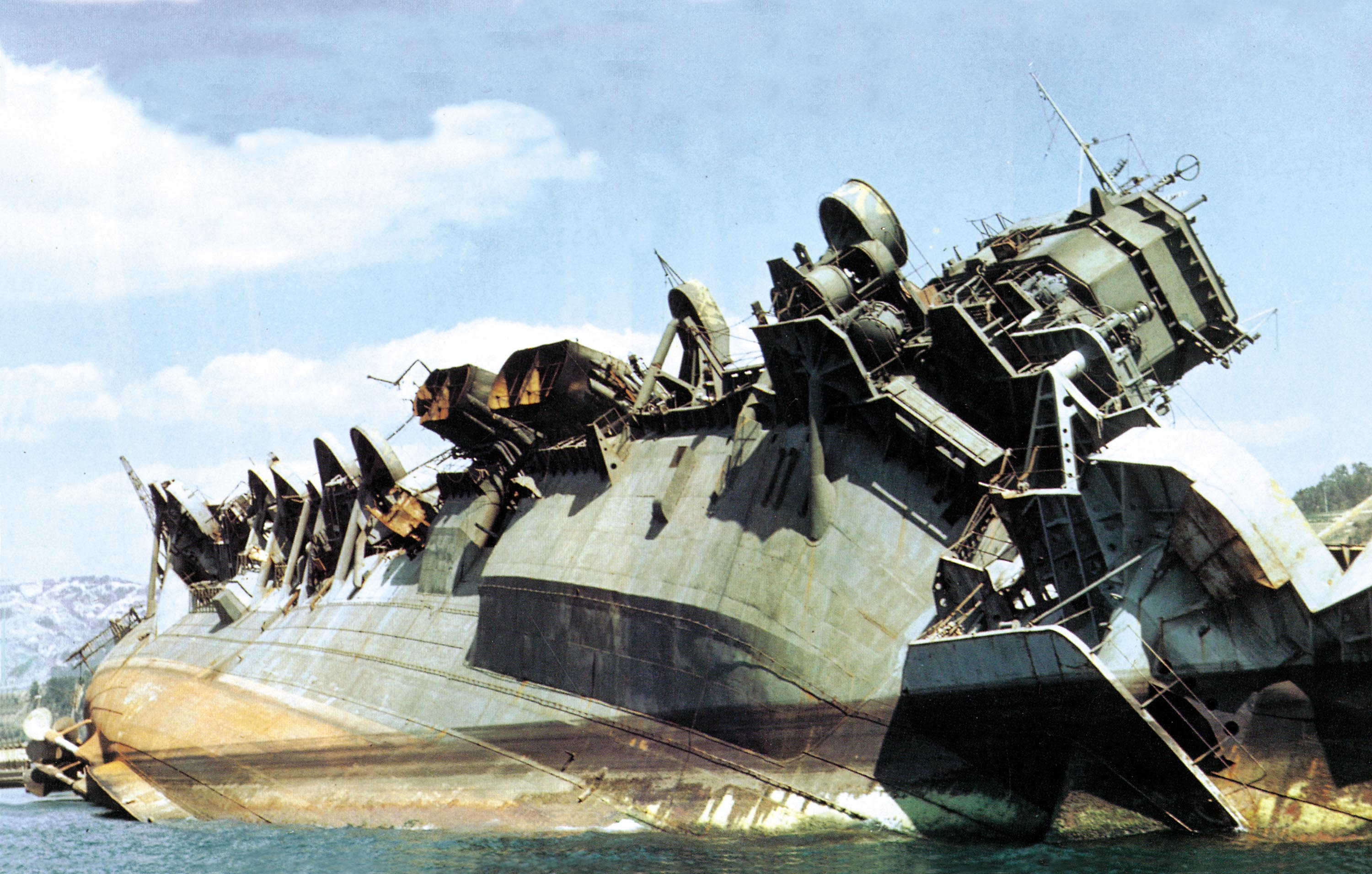
Amagi capsized in Kure harbor, 1946

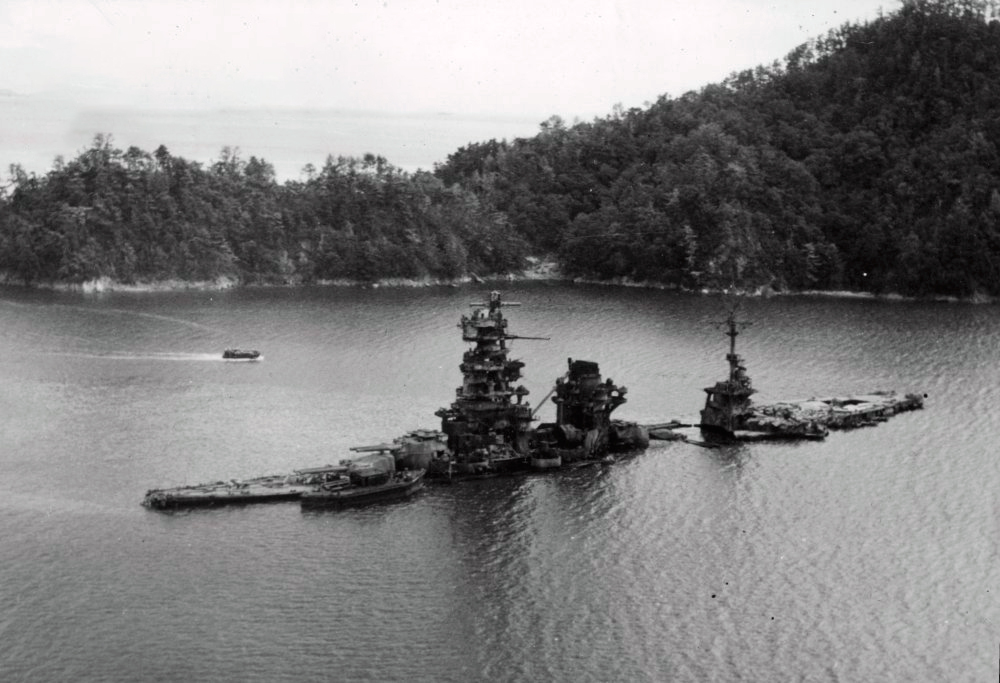
Bombed out wreck of Hyūga sunk in shallow waters of Hiroshima Bay, 1945

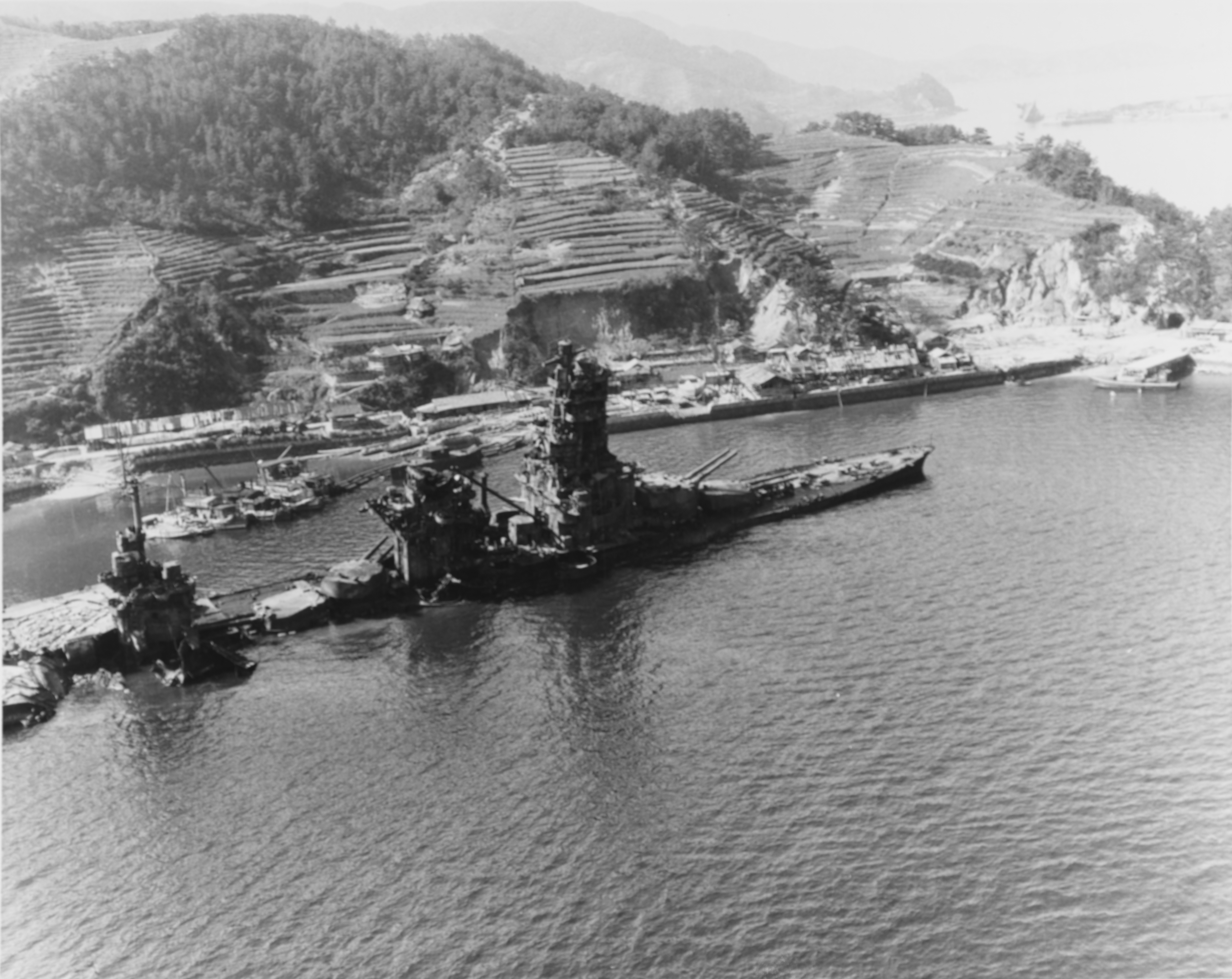
Ise, sunk in Ondo-no-seto strait, October 1945

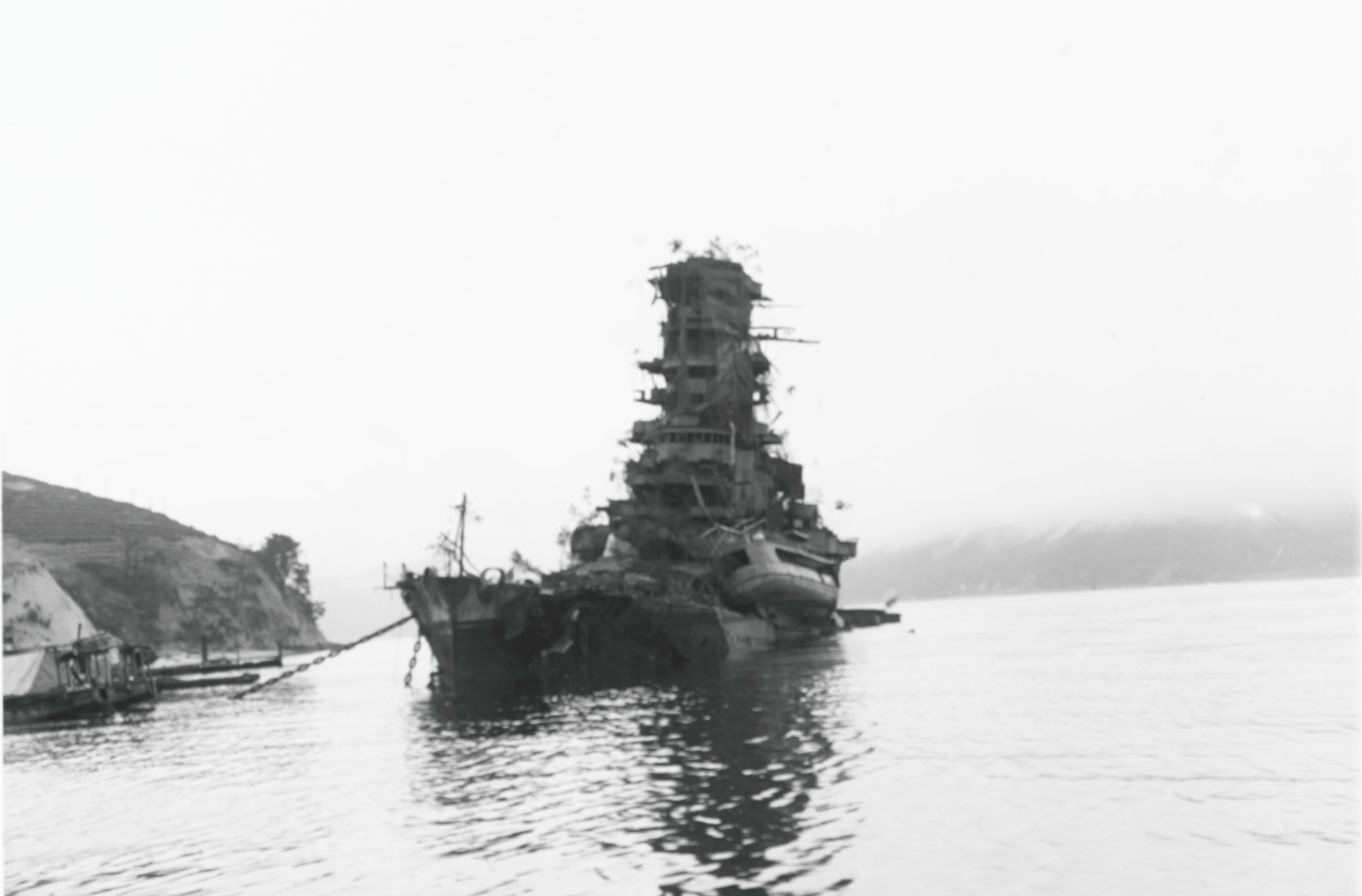
Heavily damaged Haruna sunk at her moorings in Kure harbor, October 1945.

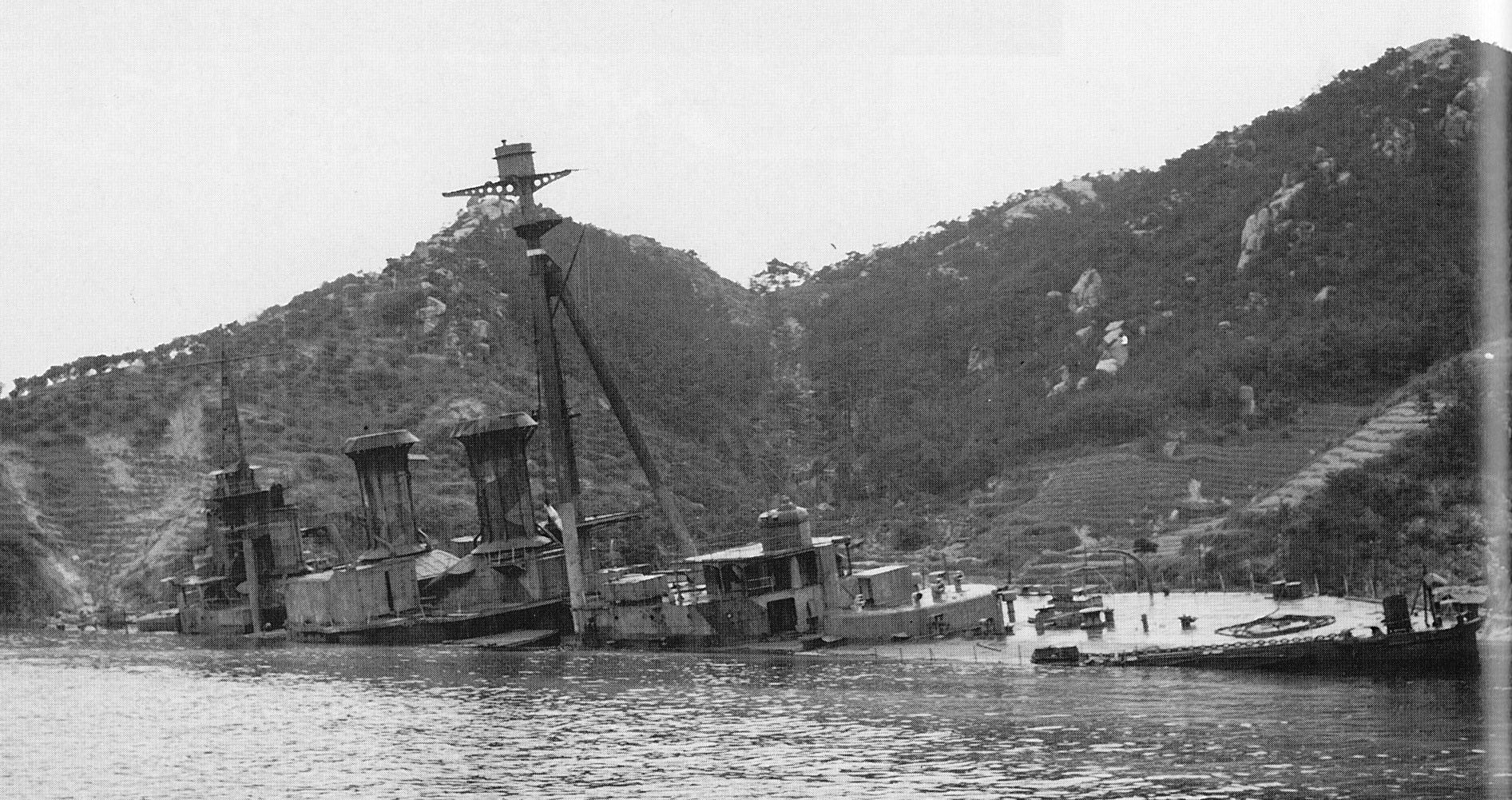
Settsu grounded at Etajima, October 1945

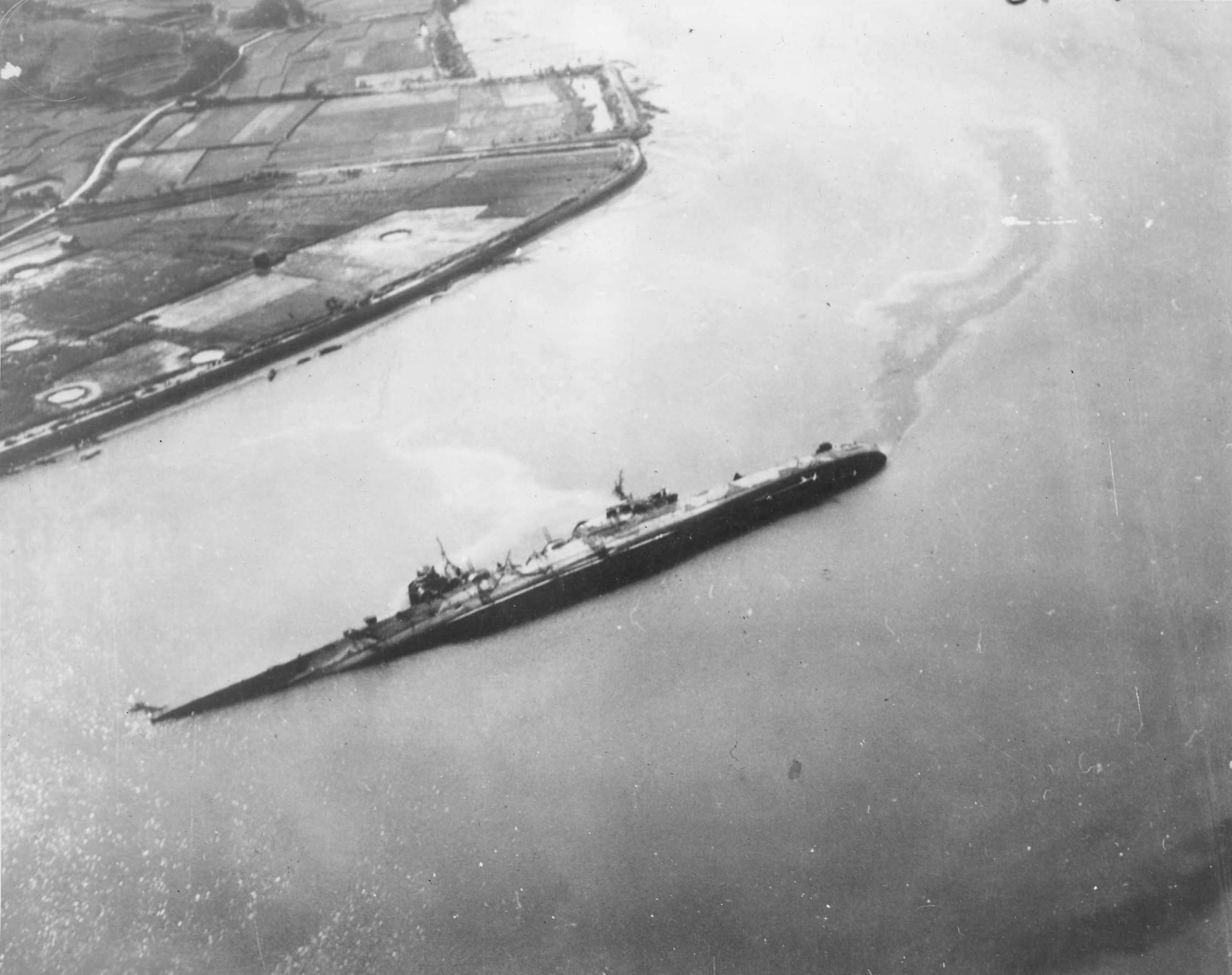
Ōyodo capsized in shallow waters, 28 July 1945

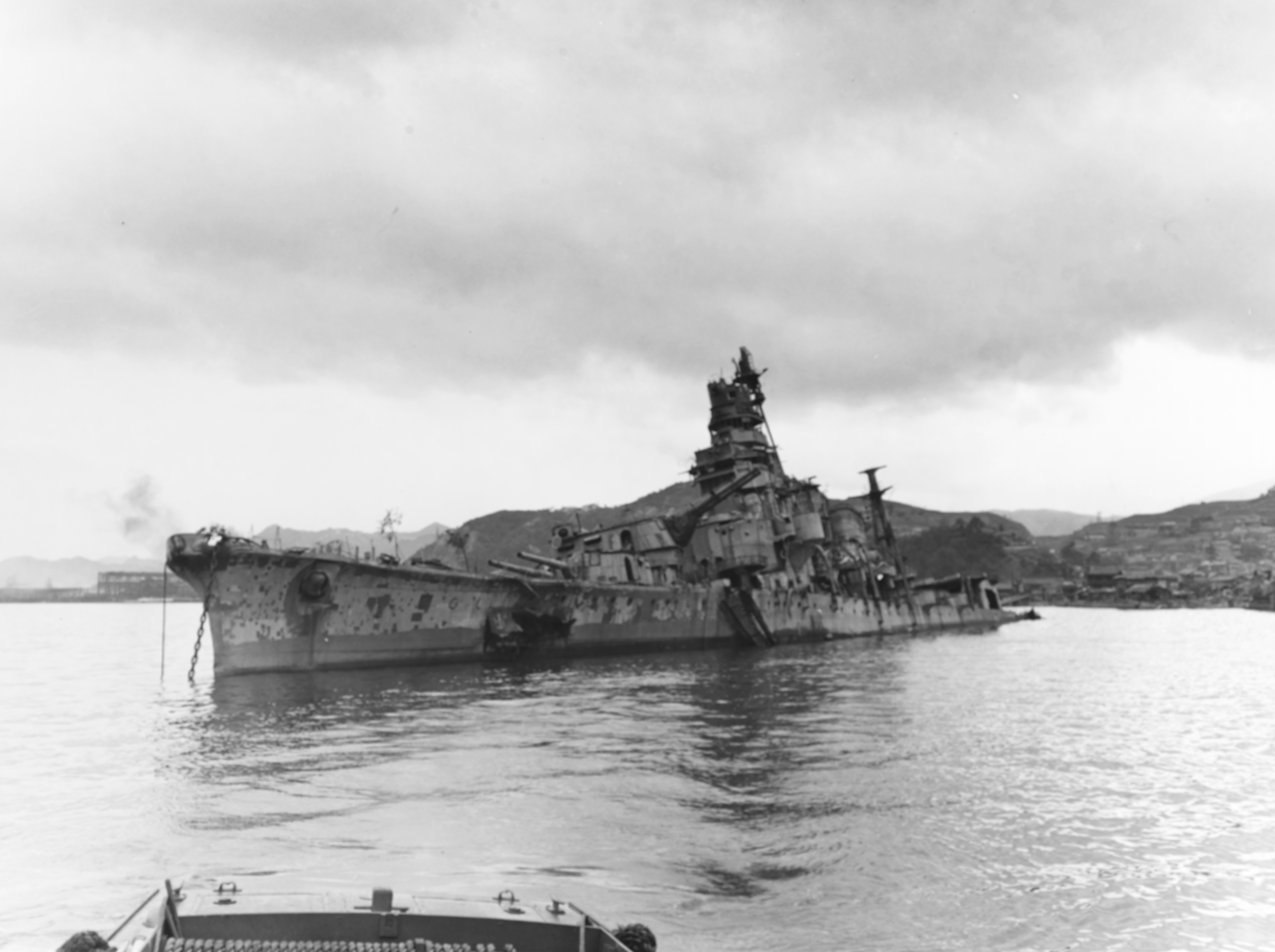
Aoba sunk in harbor, October 1945

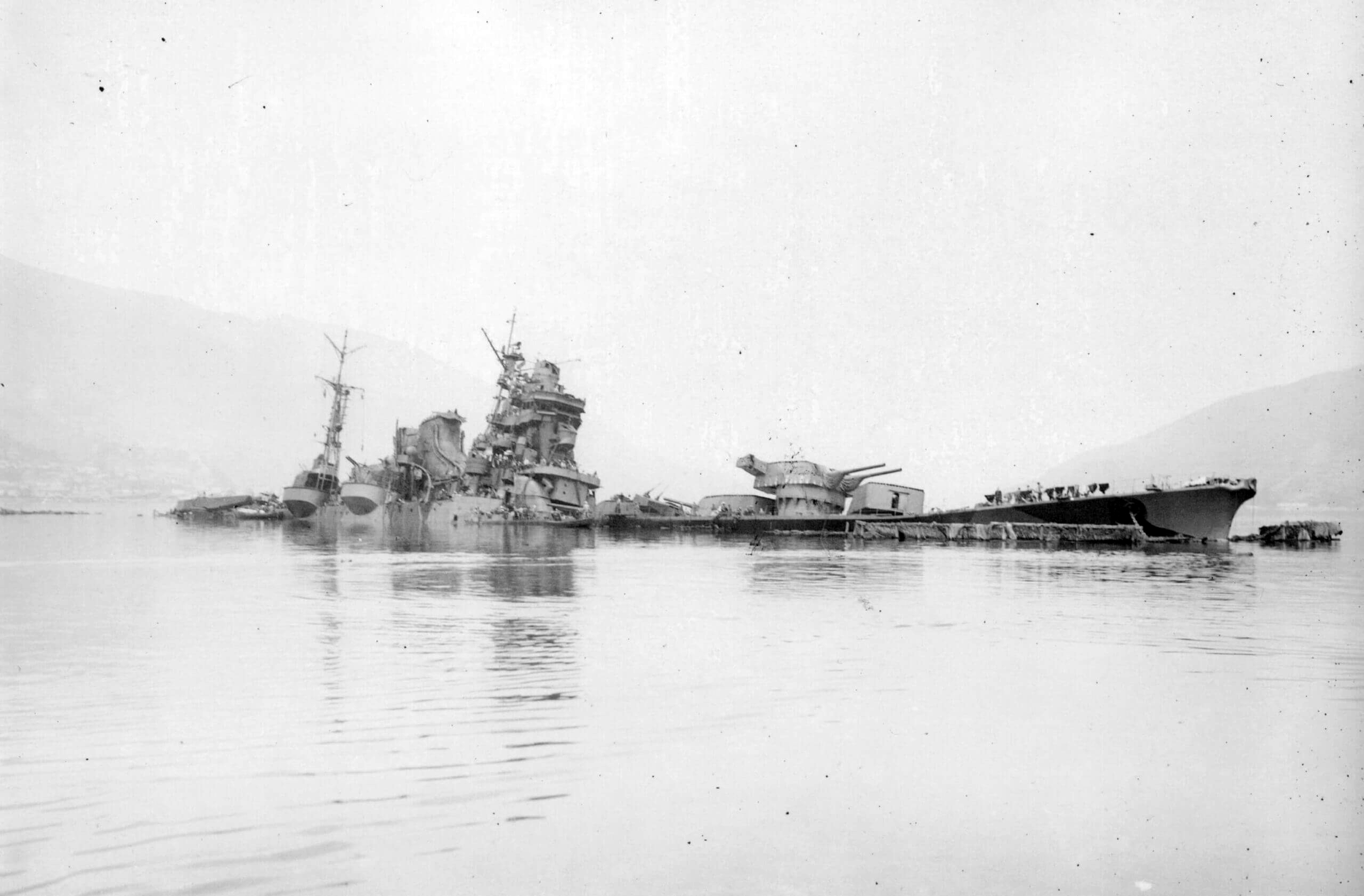
Tone sunk in Etajima Bay, 29 July 1945

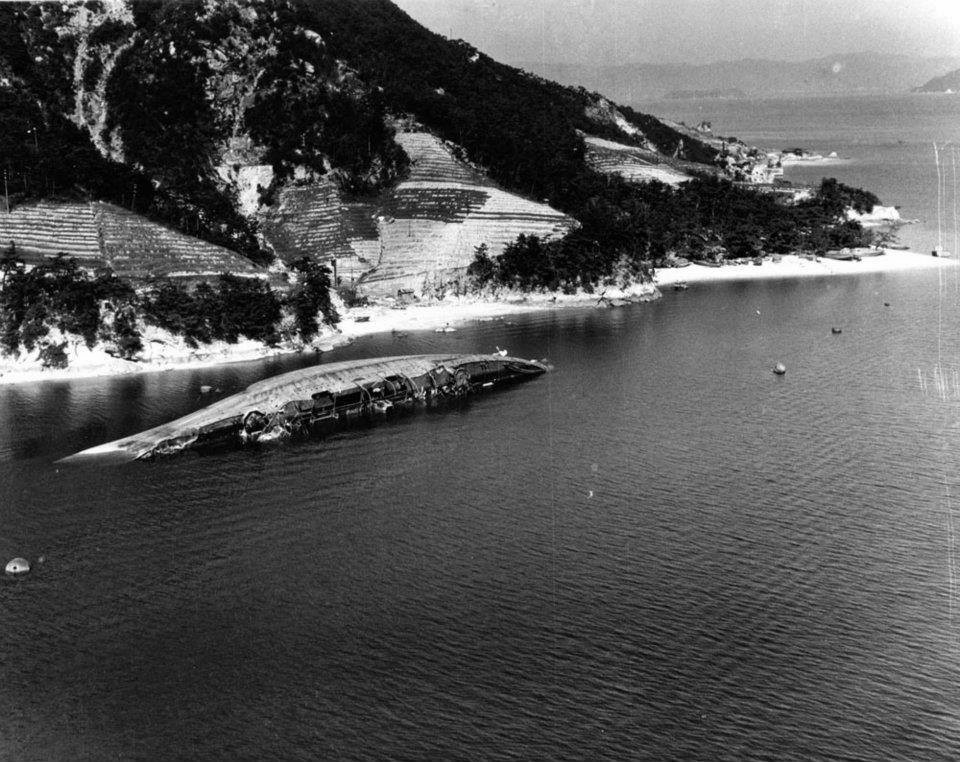
Capsized wreck of Izumo

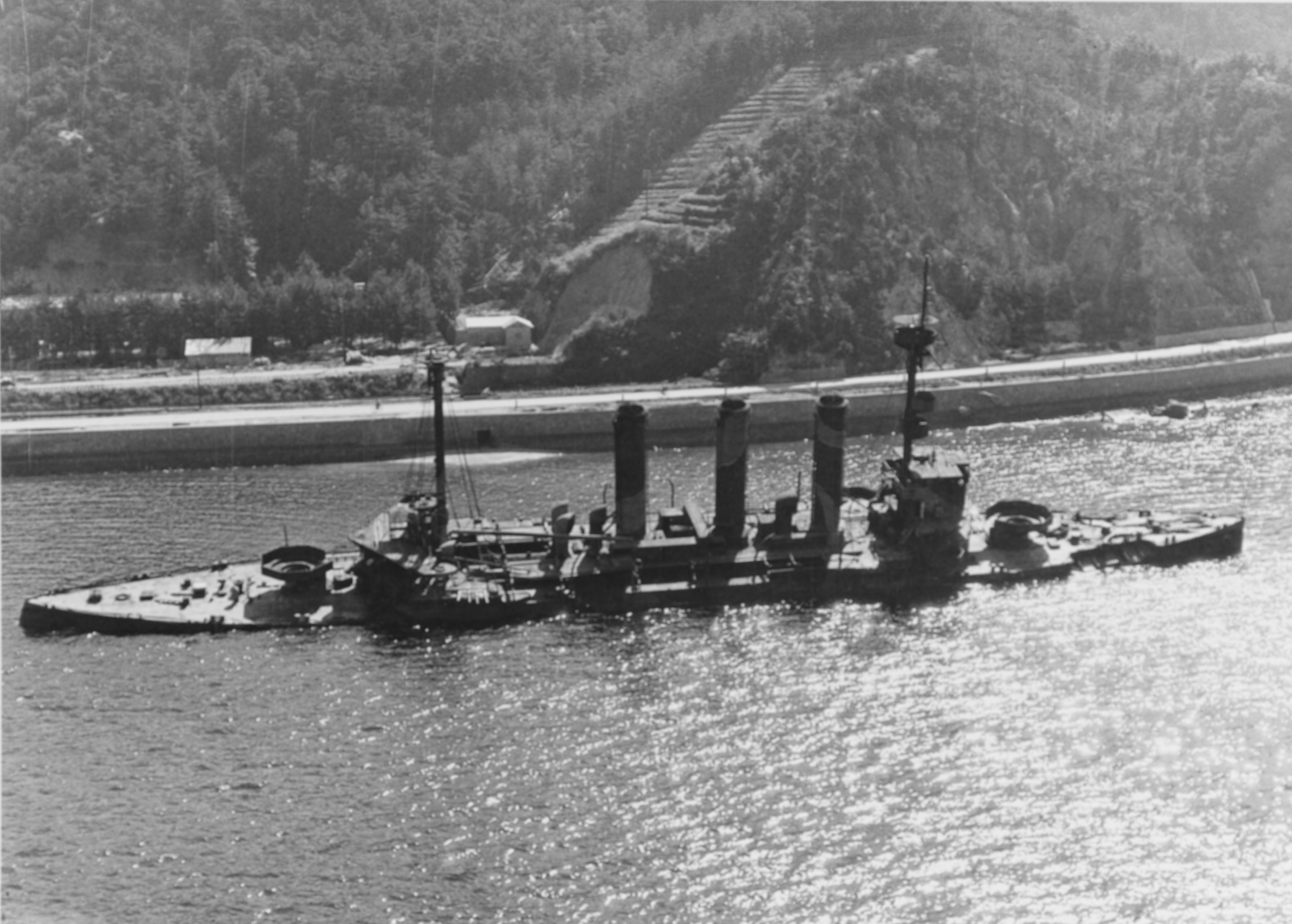
Iwate, sunk in shallow waters in Kure, October 1945
