= Tiancheng =

Tiancheng or Tian Cheng may refer to:

- Chengdu Tiancheng F.C., a football club based in Chengdu, Sichuan, China
- Tian Cheng International, an auction house specializing in the sale of Chinese art and jadeite

== Places in China ==
- Tiancheng, Shaanxi, (天成镇) a town in Long County, Shaanxi
- Tiancheng, Dazhu (天城镇), a town in Dazhu County, Sichuan
- Tiancheng Township, Inner Mongolia (天成乡), a township in Liangcheng County, Inner Mongolia
- Tiancheng Township, Sichuan (天成乡), a township in Peng'an County, Sichuan

== Historical eras ==
- Tiancheng (555), era name used by Xiao Yuanming, emperor of the Liang dynasty
- Tiancheng (758–759), era name used by An Qingxu, emperor of Yan
- Tiancheng (926–930), era name used by Li Siyuan, emperor of Later Tang
