= Amagi Line =

Amagi Line may refer to:

- Amagi Railway Amagi Line
- Nishitetsu Amagi Line
