= Japanese aircraft carrier Katsuragi =

Imperial Japanese Navy's Unryū-class aircraft carrier

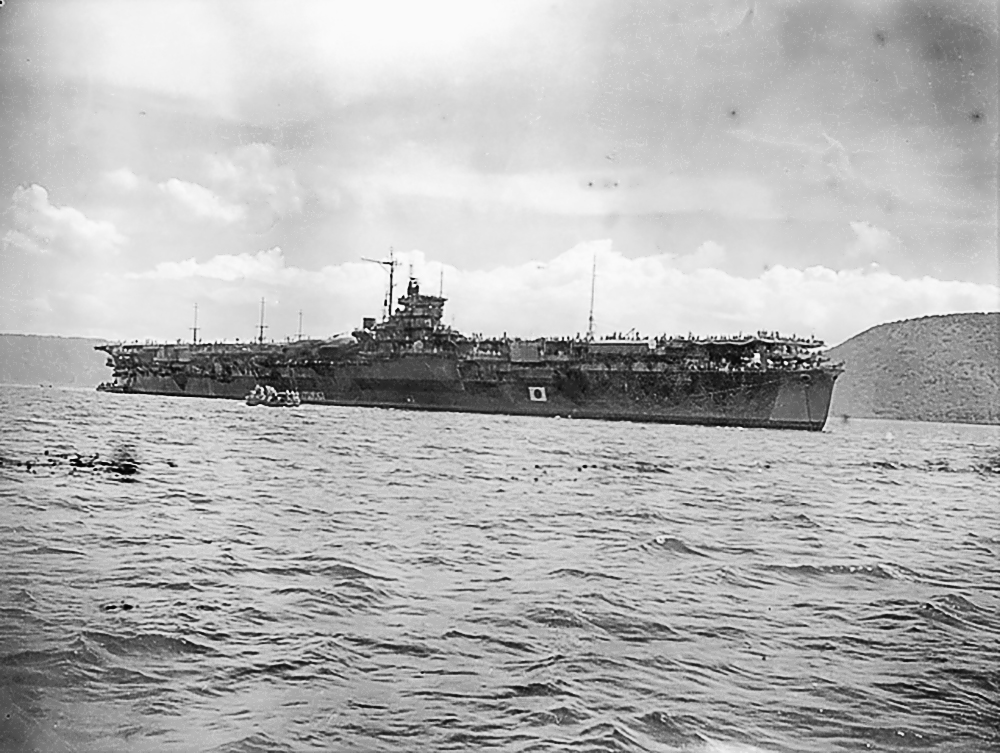
- Katsuragi serving as a troop transport, 1946

History

Empire of Japan
- Name: Katsuragi
- Namesake: Mount Katsuragi
- Ordered: 25 June 1942
- Builder: Kure Naval Arsenal
- Laid down: 8 December 1942
- Launched: 19 January 1944
- Completed: 15 October 1944
- Stricken: 15 November 1946
- Fate: Scrapped, 22 December 1946 – 30 November 1947

General characteristics (as built)
- Class & type: Unryū-class aircraft carrier
- Displacement: 22,534 t (22,178 long tons) (deep load)
- Length: 227.35 m (745 ft 11 in)
- Beam: 22 m (72 ft 2 in)
- Draft: 7.93 m (26 ft 0 in)
- Installed power: 8 Kampon water-tube boilers; 104,000 shp (78,000 kW)
- Propulsion: 4 shafts; 4 geared steam turbine sets
- Speed: 32 knots (59 km/h; 37 mph)
- Complement: 1,536 (1,600 as flagship)
- Sensors & processing systems: 2 × Type 2, Mark 2, Model 1 air search radars; 2 × Type 3, Mark 1, Model 3 air search radars; 1 × Type 93 sonar; 2 × Type 0 hydrophones
- Electronic warfare & decoys: 1 × Type E-27 radar detector; 1 × Model 3 radar detector
- Armament: 6 × 2 – 12.7 cm/40 Type 89 DP guns; 22 × 3, 30 × 1 – 25 mm (0.98 in) Type 96 AA guns; 6 × 28 - 12 cm (4.7 in) AA rocket launchers
- Armor: Belt: 25–100 mm (0.98–3.94 in); Deck: 25–130 mm (0.98–5.12 in)

Katsuragi (葛城) was the third and final Unryū-class aircraft carrier of the Imperial Japanese Navy built during World War II. Named after Mount Katsuragi, in Nara Prefecture, and completed late in the war; she never embarked her complement of aircraft and spent the war in Japanese waters. The ship was badly damaged in a July 1945 airstrike by American carrier aircraft on Kure Naval Base. Repaired after the end of the war, Katsuragi was then used as a repatriation transport for a number of months, bringing Japanese soldiers and civilians back to Japan from overseas locations. She was scrapped in Japan beginning in late 1946.

== Design and description ==
The last purpose-built Japanese carrier construction during World War II was a group of vessels based on an improved Hiryū design, but with individual units differing in detail reflecting the changing circumstances as the conflict in the Pacific approached its conclusion. Katsuragi was ordered 25 June 1942, under the provisional name of #5003, as part of the Kai-Maru 5 Program of 1942. This was a massive naval construction program intended to replace losses suffered at the Battle of Midway and focused on aircraft and aircraft carriers. The ship was one of 16 Unryū-class aircraft carriers planned, although only three were completed before the end of the war. (Note: Two of these ships were canceled to release a slipway and material to convert Shinano into an aircraft carrier.)

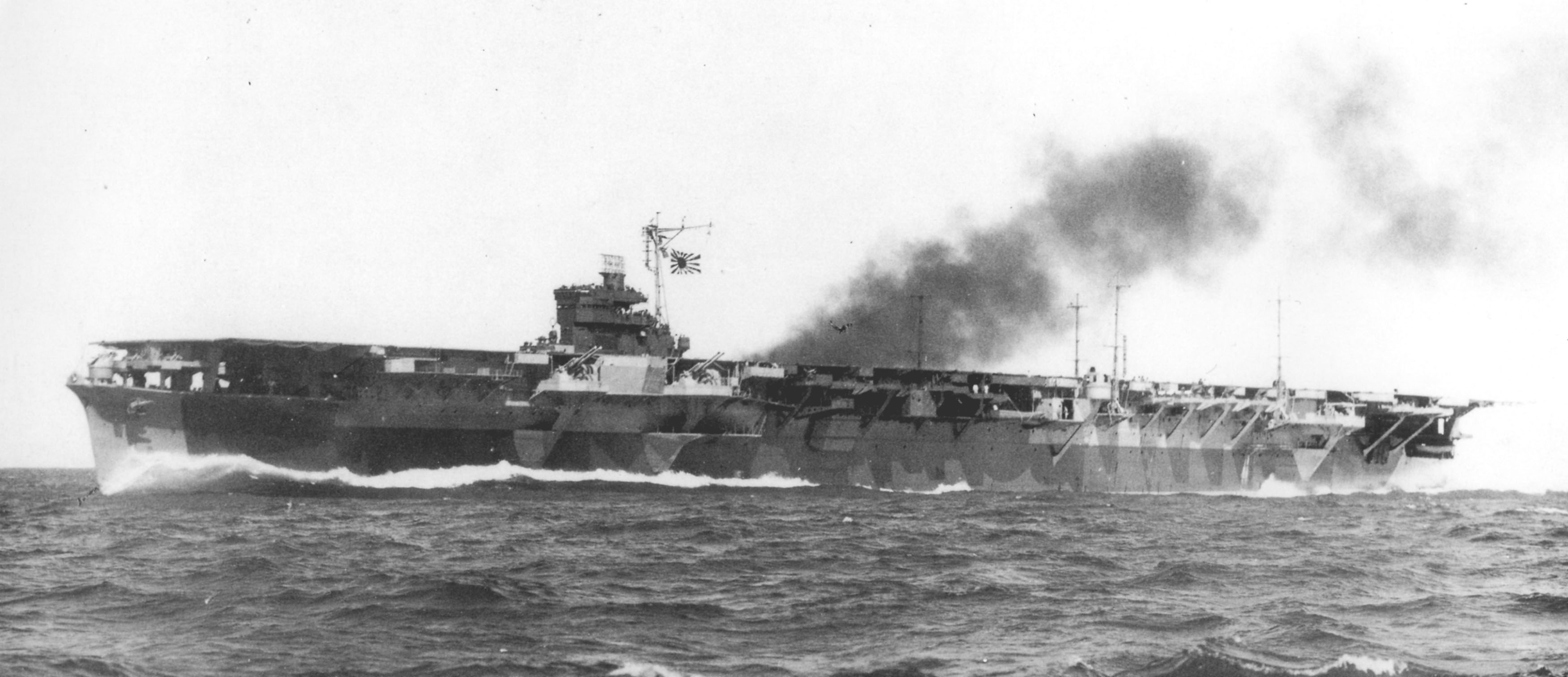
Katsuragi in 1944

Katsuragi had the same hull design as Hiryu. She had a length of 227.35 meters (745 ft 11 in) overall. She had a beam of 22 meters (72 ft 2 in) and, at deep load, a draft of 7.93 meters (26 ft 0 in). She displaced 22,535 tonnes (22,179 long tons) at deep load. Her crew consisted of 1,576 officers and men. When acting as a flagship she had a total of 1,600 crewmembers.

A shortage of turbines and boilers led to machinery of the same type as that used in the Akizuki-class destroyer being used in Katsuragi. These consisted of four geared steam turbine sets with a total of 104,000 shaft horsepower (78,000 kW) driving four shafts, each fitted with a 3.75-meter (12.3 ft) propeller. Steam was provided by eight Kampon Type B water-tube boilers with a working pressure of 30 kg/cm^{2} (2,942 kPa; 427 psi) at 350 °C (662 °F). The ship had a designed speed of 32 knots (59 km/h; 37 mph), but during sea trials on 12 October 1944, she reached 32.71 knots (60.58 km/h; 37.64 mph) at the light displacement of 18,144 long tons (18,435 t). Katsuragi carried 3,671 tonnes (3,613 long tons) of fuel oil although no data on her range is known. She had two funnels on the starboard side, each angled below horizontal. They were fitted with a water-cooling system to reduce the turbulence caused by hot exhaust gases.

=== Flight deck arrangements ===
Katsuragi's flight deck was 216.9 meters (711 ft 7 in) long and had a maximum width of 27 meters (88 ft 7 in). A small island was mounted well forward on the starboard side and contained the ship's bridge and air operations control center. It was fitted with a small tripod mast that mounted one of the ship's radar antennas. The ship was designed with two superimposed hangars that were served by two aircraft elevators, each 14 by 14 meters (46 by 46 ft); the center elevator as used in Hiryū was deleted to simplify construction and reduce stress in the hull. The elevators had a maximum capacity of 7,000 kilograms (15,000 lb) and took 19 seconds to go from the lower hangar to the flight deck. Katsuragi was fitted with hydraulically operated Type 3 arresting gear with nine cables. She also mounted three Type 3 crash barricades. No aircraft catapult was fitted. The ship mounted a retractable crane on the starboard side of the flight deck, just aft of the rear elevator.

The ship's air group was originally intended to consist of 12 Mitsubishi A6M Zero fighters, plus three in storage, 27 Aichi D3A Val dive bombers, plus three in reserve, and 18 Nakajima B5N "Kate" torpedo bombers (plus two in crates). Katsuragi's hangars could not accommodate so many aircraft so eleven planes were planned to be permanently carried on the flight deck. In 1943 the air group was revised to consist of 18 Mitsubishi A7M "Sam" fighters (+2 in storage), 27 Yokosuka D4Y "Judy" dive bombers and six Nakajima C6N "Myrt" reconnaissance aircraft. Of these, the C6Ns were intended to be carried on the flight deck. When the ship commissioned in 1944, neither the A7M nor the C6Ns were yet in service, so the air group was reconfigured to consist of 27 Zeros, 12 D4Ys, three of which were to be the reconnaissance version, and nine Nakajima B6N "Jill" torpedo bombers. By this time, however, the shortage of carrier-qualified aircrew was such that they were ordered to operate from shore bases and Katsuragi never embarked her air group. Katsuragi carried 397,340 liters (87,400 imp gal; 104,970 U.S. gal) of aviation gasoline for her aircraft.

=== Armor, armament and sensors ===
Katsuragi's waterline armored belt was made from New Vickers Non-Cemented armor 25 to 100 mm (1.0 to 3.9 in) thick. Her deck armor above the magazines that consisted of 56 mm (2.2 in) of CNC1 armor. The ship's machinery spaces and auxiliary machinery rooms had two layers of Ducol steel, each 25 mm thick, to protect them. Above engine and boiler rooms, the lower deck consisted of 25 mm of CNC2 armor. The deck over the rear auxiliary machinery space was 42 mm (1.7 in) of CNC2 armor while the lower platform deck over the forward auxiliary machinery space consisted of 56 mm of CNC2. The upper hangar deck served as the ship's strength deck and it consisted of five layers of Ducol steel, a total 115 mm (4.5 in) in thickness. Katsuragi's aviation gasoline tanks were fore and aft of the auxiliary machinery spaces and were protected by 50 mm (2.0 in) of Ducol steel in two layers while the deck above them consisted of 25 mm of CNC2 armor. The sides, bottom and top of the steering gear compartment consisted of 56 mm of CNC1 armor.

The ship's primary armament consisted of a dozen 40-caliber 12.7 cm Type 89 anti-aircraft (AA) guns in twin mounts. Their sponsons were positioned to allow them some measure of cross-deck fire. Katsuragi was also equipped with 22 triple 25 mm Type 96 and thirty single Type 96 AA gun mounts, most on sponsons along the sides of the hull. These guns were supplemented by six 28-round AA rocket launchers. For defense against submarines, the carrier was fitted with six depth charge throwers and carried between six and ten depth charges for them.

Two Type 94 high-angle fire-control directors, one on each side of the ship, were fitted to control the Type 89 guns. Each director mounted a 4.5-meter (14 ft 9 in) rangefinder. Six Type 95 directors controlled the 25 mm guns and the 12 cm rocket launchers. Early warning was provided by two Type 2, Mark 2, Model 1 air search radars. One of these was mounted on the top of the island while the other retracted into the port side of the flight deck, between the two elevators. In addition, Katsuragi had two smaller Type 3, Mark 1, Model 3 air search radars, one mounted on the tripod mast on the island and the other on the aft starboard retractable radio mast. She also had two radar detectors: a metric Type E-27 and a centimetric Model 3 system. The ship had a Type 93 sonar and two Type 0 hydrophones with which to search for submarines. Before the end of the war, a Type 2, Mark 2, Model 4 surface fire-control radar was installed. In addition, a Type 14 early warning radar, ordinarily land-based, was mounted for trials aboard ship.

== Service ==
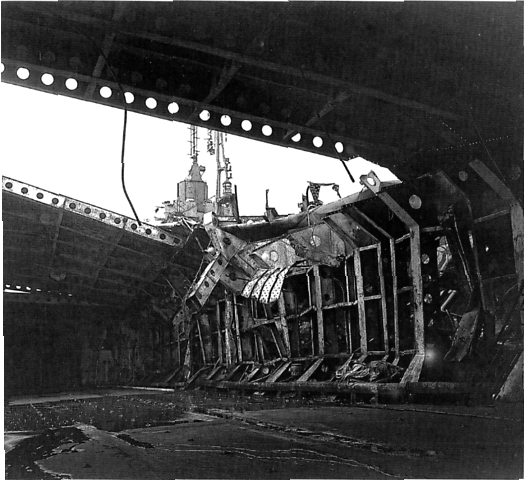
Katsuragi's upper hangar deck after an American 2,000-pound (910 kg) bomb detonated therein. Note the two radar antennas visible through the hole in the flight deck.

Katsuragi's keel was laid down by the Kure Naval Arsenal in Kure, Hiroshima, on 8 December 1942. She was launched on 19 January 1944 and completed on 15 October 1944. The ship was transferred among a number of ports on the Inland Sea until she arrived in Kure on 15 February 1945 and she was ordered to be camouflaged. Her flight deck was disguised with fake trees, houses and roads; however, her anti-aircraft batteries remained fully manned. Her intended air group, Air Group 601, was committed to the Battle of Iwo Jima about that same time. On 19 March, the ship was attacked by aircraft from Task Force 58 and lightly damaged by several rocket hits; one man was killed and three wounded in the attack. Five days later, the ship was semi-permanently moored at the island of Mitsukojima in Kure harbor and extensively camouflaged. On 20 April, Captain Toshio Miyazaki was appointed commanding officer of Katsuragi.

Aircraft from USN Task Force 38 attacked the ship on 24 July as part of a major raid on Kure and the Inland Sea, but she was only hit once. A 500-pound (230 kg) bomb struck one of the ship's anti-aircraft mounts on the port side. Thirteen men were killed and five wounded, but the bomb did little other damage. A second raid on 28 July did far more damage to the ship as a 2,000-pound (910 kg) bomb penetrated the flight deck and detonated in the upper hangar, between the elevators. The explosion blew out a 20-foot (6.1 m) section of the port hangar wall and the walls of the upper hangar deck were bulged and perforated multiple times. The flight deck between the elevators was bulged up and buckled; one section of the flight deck was blown out and flung over to starboard to land across the funnels. Only 13 men were killed (including her executive officer) and another 12 men were wounded during the attack.

Katsuragi survived the war without sustaining any further damage, and was designated as a Special Transfer Ship on 2 October and then assigned to repatriation duty on 13 October after the necessary repairs were made. Her crew at this time consisted only of 12 officers, one warrant officer, and 40 petty officers and crewmen, with Captain Miyazaki still in command. The damage from the July attack was only repaired enough to allow the hangar deck to house some 5,000 returning soldiers and civilians and the ship began her first voyage outside Japanese waters on 19 December. On this first voyage, she called upon Minamidaitojima, Rabaul and Australia. Upon her return, further repairs were necessary to make her rain-tight. These were completed by 15 January 1946 and she made a number of trips in early 1946 to bring back Japanese nationals. before being placed on standby in April. Katsuragi was stricken from the Navy List on 15 November and transferred to the Home Ministry for disposal five days later. Scrapping of the ship began on 22 December 1946 at the Hitachi Zosen facility in Osaka-Sakurajima and was completed on 30 November 1947.
