= Japanese aircraft carrier Amagi =

Unryū-class aircraft carrier

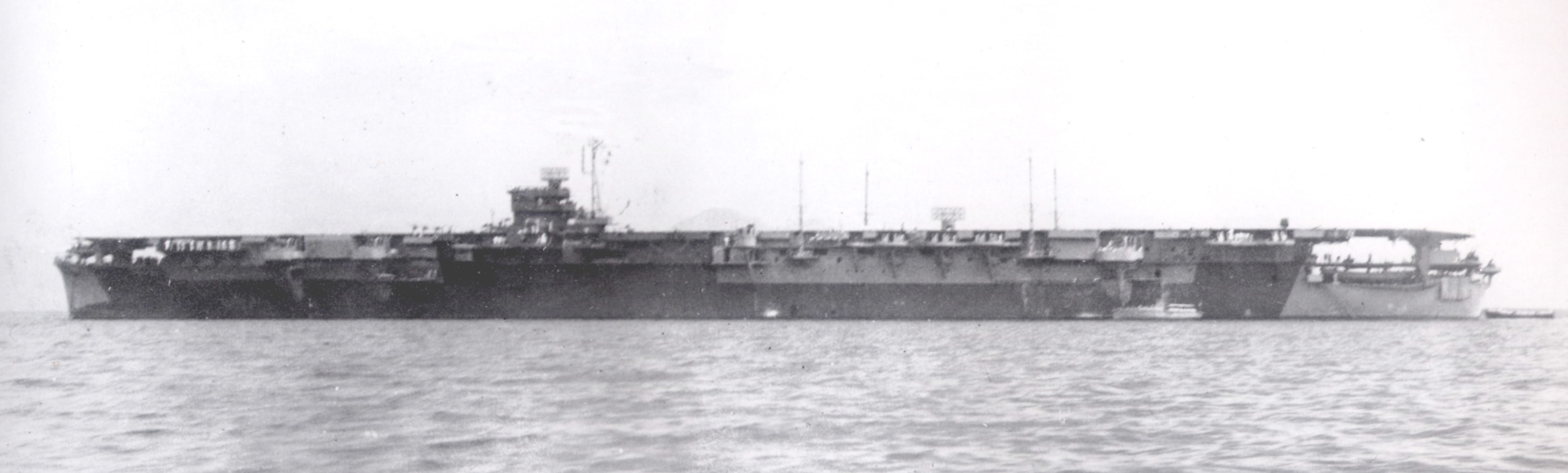
- Amagi

History

Empire of Japan
- Name: Amagi (天城)
- Namesake: Mount Amagi
- Builder: Mitsubishi, Nagasaki
- Laid down: 1 October 1942
- Launched: 15 October 1943
- Commissioned: 10 August 1944
- Fate: Capsized after air attacks, 29 July 1945, scrapped 1946–1947

General characteristics (as built)
- Class & type: Unryū-class aircraft carrier
- Displacement: 20,450 t (20,130 long tons)
- Length: 227.35 m (745 ft 11 in)
- Beam: 22 m (72 ft 2 in)
- Draft: 8.73 m (28 ft 8 in)
- Installed power: 8 Kampon water-tube boilers; 152,000 shp (113,000 kW)
- Propulsion: 4 shafts; 4 geared steam turbine sets
- Speed: 34 knots (63 km/h; 39 mph)
- Range: 8,000 nmi (15,000 km; 9,200 mi) at 18 knots (33 km/h; 21 mph)
- Complement: 1,595
- Sensors & processing systems: 2 × Type 2, Mark 2, Model 1 air search radars; 2 × Type 3, Mark 1, Model 3 air search radars; 1 × Type 93 sonar; 2 × Type 0 hydrophones
- Armament: 6 × twin 12.7 cm/40 Type 89 DP guns; 13 × triple, 3 × single Type 96 25 mm (0.98 in) AA guns; 6 × 28 – 12 cm (4.7 in) AA rocket launchers
- Armor: Belt: 48–140 mm (1.9–5.5 in); Deck: 25–56 mm (0.98–2.20 in)

Amagi (天城) was an Unryū-class aircraft carrier built for the Imperial Japanese Navy during World War II. Named after Mount Amagi, and completed late in the war, she never embarked her complement of aircraft and spent the war in Japanese waters. The ship capsized in July 1945 after being hit multiple times during airstrikes by American carrier aircraft while moored at Kure Naval Base. Amagi was refloated in 1946 and scrapped later that year.

== Design and description ==
The last purpose-built Japanese carrier construction during World War II was a group of vessels based on an improved Hiryū design, but with individual units differing in detail reflecting the changing circumstances as the conflict in the Pacific approached its conclusion. Amagi was ordered, under the provisional name of #5001, as part of the Kai-Maru 5 Program of 1942. This was a massive naval construction program intended to replace losses suffered at the Battle of Midway and focused on aircraft and aircraft carriers. The ship was one of 16 Unryū-class aircraft carriers planned, although only three were completed before the end of the war. (Note: Two of these ships were canceled to release a slipway and material to convert Shinano into an aircraft carrier.)

Amagi had a length of 227.35 meters (745 ft 11 in) overall. She had a beam of 22 meters (72 ft 2 in) and a draft of 8.73 meters (28 ft 8 in). She displaced 20,450 metric tons (20,130 long tons). Her crew consisted of 1,595 officers and men.

The Unryū-class carriers used the same turbines and boilers as used in the heavy cruiser Suzuya. These consisted of four geared steam turbine sets with a total of 152,000 shaft horsepower (113,000 kW) driving four shafts using steam provided by eight Kampon Type B water-tube boilers. The ship had a designed speed of 34 knots (63 km/h; 39 mph). Amagi carried 3,670 metric tons (3,610 long tons) of fuel oil which gave her a range of 8,000 nautical miles (15,000 km; 9,200 mi) at 18 knots (33 km/h; 21 mph). She had two funnels on the starboard side, each angled below the horizontal. They were fitted with a water-cooling system to reduce the turbulence caused by hot exhaust gases.

=== Flight deck arrangements ===
Amagi's flight deck was 216.9 meters (711 ft 7 in) long and had a maximum width of 27 meters (88 ft 7 in). A small island was mounted well forward on the starboard side and contained the ship's bridge and air operations control center. It was fitted with a small tripod mast that mounted one of the ship's radar antennas. The ship was designed with two superimposed hangars that were served by two aircraft elevators, each 14 by 14 meters (46 by 46 ft); the center elevator as used in Hiryū was deleted to simplify construction and reduce stress in the hull. The elevators had a maximum capacity of 7,000 kilograms (15,000 lb) and took 19 seconds to go from the lower hangar to the flight deck. Amagi was fitted with hydraulically operated Type 3 arresting gear with nine cables. She also mounted three Type 3 crash barricades. No aircraft catapult was fitted. The ship mounted a retractable crane on the starboard side of the flight deck, just aft of the rear elevator. Amagi carried 397,340 liters (87,400 imp gal; 104,970 U.S. gal) of aviation gasoline for her aircraft.

The ship's air group was originally intended to consist of 12 Mitsubishi A6M Zero fighters, plus three in storage, 27 Aichi D3A Val dive bombers, plus three in reserve, and 18 Nakajima B5N "Kate" torpedo bombers plus two in crates. Amagi's hangars could not accommodate so many aircraft so eleven planes were planned to be permanently carried on the flight deck. In 1943 the air group was revised to consist of 18 Mitsubishi A7M "Sam" fighters (+2 in storage), 27 Yokosuka D4Y "Judy" dive bombers and six Nakajima C6N "Myrt" reconnaissance aircraft. Of these, the C6Ns were intended to be carried on the flight deck. When the ship commissioned in 1944, neither the A7M nor the C6Ns were yet in service, so the air group was reconfigured to consist of 27 Zeros, 12 D4Ys, three of which were to be the reconnaissance version, and nine Nakajima B6N "Jill" torpedo bombers. By this time, however, the shortage of carrier-qualified aircrew was such that they were ordered to operate from shore bases and Amagi never embarked her air group.

=== Armor, armament and sensors ===
Amagi's waterline armored belt was 46 millimeters (1.8 in) thick over her machinery spaces and 140 millimeters (5.5 in) over her magazines. Her deck armor above the machinery was 25 millimeters (0.98 in) thick, but the armor above the magazines was 56 millimeters (2.2 in) thick.

The ship's primary armament consisted of a dozen 40-caliber 12.7 cm Type 89 anti-aircraft (AA) guns in twin mounts on sponsons on the ship's sides. Amagi was initially equipped with 16 triple 25 mm Type 96 and three single AA gun mounts, most on sponsons along the sides of the hull. By the end of the war, the ship mounted 22 triple and 23 single mounts. These guns were supplemented by six 12 cm (4.7 in) 28-round AA rocket launchers. For defense against submarines, the carrier was fitted with six depth charge throwers and carried between six and ten depth charges for them.

Two Type 94 high-angle fire-control directors, one on each side of the ship, were fitted to control the Type 89 guns. Each director mounted a 4.5-meter (14 ft 9 in) rangefinder. Six Type 95 directors controlled the 25 mm guns and the rocket launchers. Early warning was provided by two Type 2, Mark 2, Model 1 air search radars. One of these was mounted on the top of the island while the other retracted into the port side of the flight deck, between the two elevators. In addition, Amagi had two smaller Type 3, Mark 1, Model 3 air search radars, one mounted on the tripod mast on the island and the other on the aft starboard retractable radio mast.

== Service ==
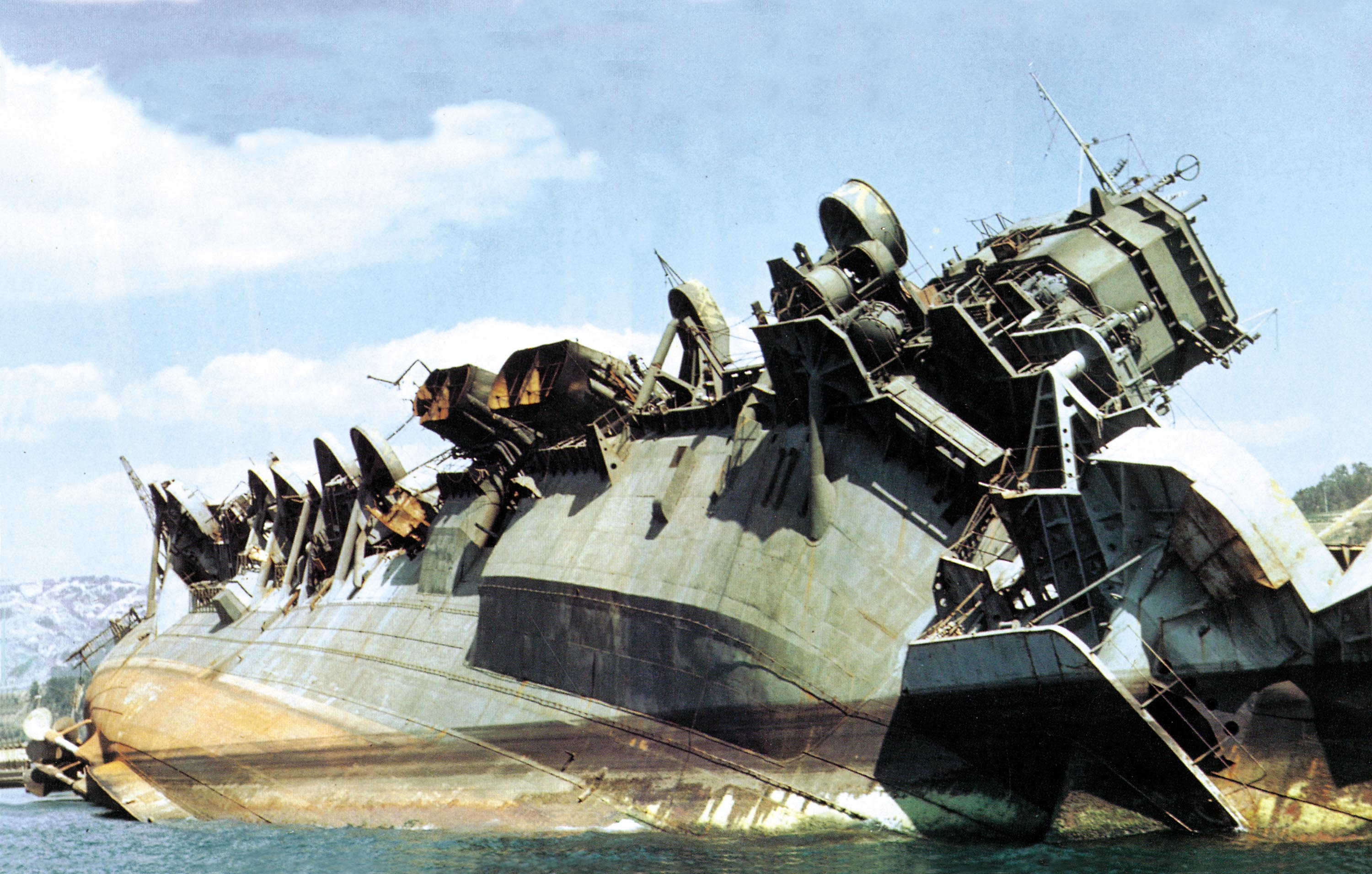
Amagi, capsized in Kure harbor, 1946

Amagi's keel was laid down by Mitsubishi in Nagasaki, on 1 October 1942. She was launched on 15 October 1943 and completed on 10 August 1944. The ship was transferred among a number of ports on the Inland Sea until she arrived in Kure in February 1945 and was ordered to be camouflaged. Her intended air group, 601st Naval Air Group, was committed to the Battle of Iwo Jima about that same time. Amagi was briefly refitted from 10 to 24 February. On 19 March, the ship was attacked by aircraft from Task Force 58 and lightly damaged by one bomb that struck the edge of the flight deck. On 13 April, the ship was permanently moored at an island in Kure harbor and extensively camouflaged.

This did not prevent the aircraft from Task Force 38 from locating and attacking the ship on 24 July. She was hit twice and experienced several near-misses. A 500-pound (230 kg) bomb detonated near the rear funnel, severely damaging it, but doing little other damage aside from blowing a small hole in the starboard hull. A 2,000-pound (910 kg) bomb penetrated the flight deck and detonated in the upper hangar, between the elevators. The explosion blew a 50-meter (160 ft) section of a hangar wall overboard and the walls of the upper hangar deck were bulged and perforated multiple times. The flight deck between the elevators was bulged up and buckled for a length of 200 feet (61.0 m) and the forward elevator was dropped to the bottom of its shaft. It also blew a 25-foot (7.6 m) hole in the upper hangar deck. Fragments from the explosion penetrated into the bowels of the ship, penetrating bulkheads and decks below. Fragments from near-misses penetrated the sides of the port hull and caused the forward bomb magazine, two boiler rooms, and the aft port engine room to flood.

The captain ordered the ship abandoned later in the day, and the carrier was still afloat in the evening, albeit with a slight list to port and down by the bow. Over the next couple of days, more compartments in the ship flooded and she settled on the bottom of the harbor. Another attack on 28 July hit her several more times and the resulting damage from those hits and more near-misses to port caused the ship to list further to port. This gradually increased through the next day until Amagi capsized at 10:00 on the morning of 29 July with part of her flight deck falling overboard. The losses among the ship's crew are unknown, but were supposedly light.

The ship was stricken from the Navy List on 30 November and salvage work began on 5 December. The holes in the ship's hull had to be sealed to pump the water out and decrease her draft. The remains of her flight deck and upper hangar could not be made watertight and were removed using dynamite. Pontoons were used to right the ship and she was refloated on 31 July 1947. The salvage job was conducted by the Hitachi Zosen facility in Kure and they scrapped the ship afterward. The job was completed by 12 December 1947.
