= Unryū-class aircraft carrier =

WWII Japanese ship class

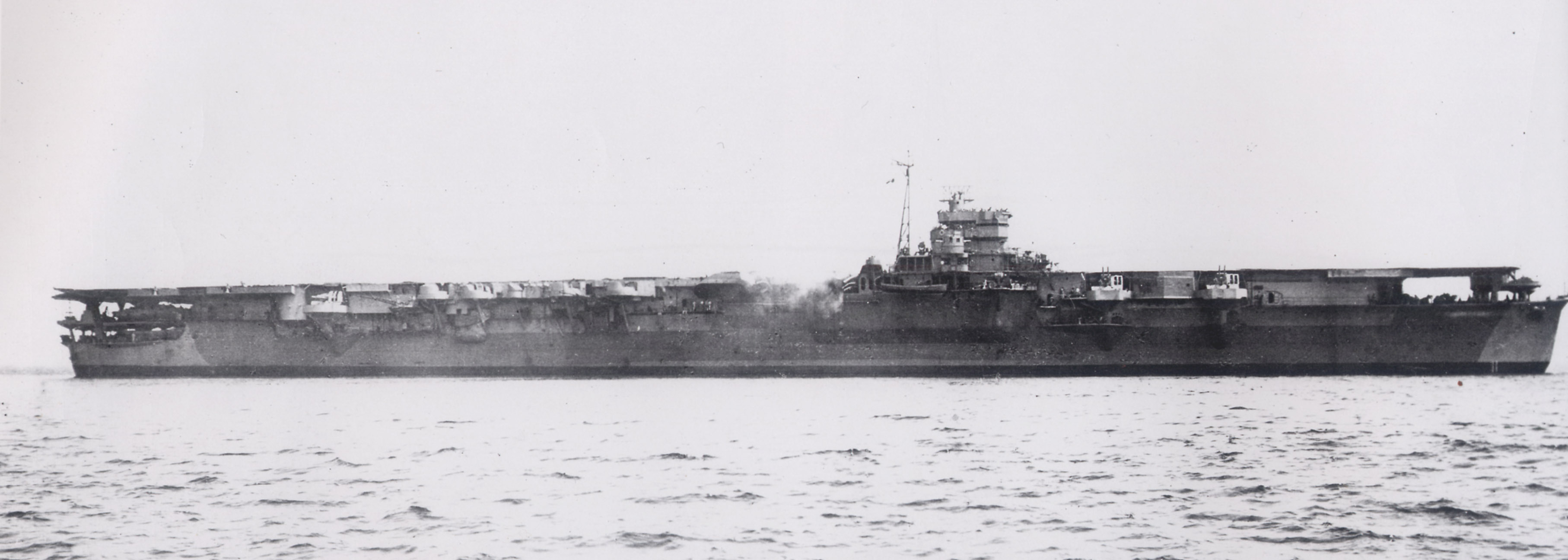
- Unryū, 16 July 1944

Class overview
- Name: Unryū class
- Builders: Yokosuka Naval Arsenal; Mitsubishi Shipyard, Nagasaki; Kure Naval Arsenal; Kawasaki Shipyard, Kobe
- Operators: Imperial Japanese Navy
- Preceded by: Taihō
- Succeeded by: Project Number G18 (planned)
- Subclasses: Unryū (Ship #302 and 5001–5006); Ikoma (Ship #5007–5015)
- Cost: 87,039,000 JPY in 1941; 93,442,000 JPY in 1942
- Built: 1942–45
- In commission: 1944–45
- Planned: 1 (1941) + 15 (1942)
- Completed: 3
- Canceled: 13
- Lost: 2 + 1 (Aso)
- Retired: 1

General characteristics
- Type: Aircraft carrier
- Displacement: Unryū and Amagi; 17,480 long tons (17,760 t) standard; all others; 17,150 long tons (17,425 t) standard
- Length: 227.35 m (745.9 ft) o/a
- Beam: 22 m (72 ft)
- Draught: 7.86 m (25.8 ft)
- Installed power: 8 × Ro-Gō Kampon water-tube boilers; Katsuragi and Aso; 104,000 shp (78,000 kW)
- Propulsion: 4 shafts; 4 × Kampon geared turbines, all others; 152,000 shp (113,000 kW)
- Speed: Katsuragi and Aso; 32 knots (37 mph; 59 km/h); all others; 34 knots (39 mph; 63 km/h)
- Range: 8,000 nmi (15,000 km) at 18 knots (33 km/h)
- Endurance: Fuel: 3,750 tons oil
- Complement: Unryū and Amagi; 1,100; Katsuragi, Kasagi and Aso; 1,500; Ikoma; 1,595
- Sensors & processing systems: Radar: Unryū and Amagi as built; 2 × Type 21 radars (top of island and flight deck); 1 × Type 13 radar (mast); Katsuragi as built; 2 × Type 21 radars (top of island and flight deck); 2 × Type 13 radars (mast and radio antenna); Amagi and Katsuragi in 1945; 1 × Type 21 radar (flight deck); 1 × Type 22 radar (top of island); 1 × Type 13 radar (mast); Sonar and hydrophone: Amagi; Type 93 hydrophone; Type 3 active sonar; all others; Type 0 hydrophone; Type 3 active sonar
- Armament: 12 (6 × 2) 127 mm Type 89 AA guns; 93 (21 × 3 and 30 × 1) Type 96 25 mm AA guns; 30 depth charges; Unryū and Amagi; 168 (6 × 28) 4.7 inch AA rockets; Kasagi; 120 (4 × 30) 4.7 inch AA rockets; all others; 180 (6 × 30) 4.7 inch AA rockets
- Armor: Deck: 25 mm (0.98 in); Belt: Katsuragi and Aso; 50 mm (2.0 in); all others; 46 mm (1.8 in)
- Aircraft carried: Plan in 1942: Unryū class; 12 + 3 Mitsubishi A6M; 27 + 3 Aichi D3A; 18 + 2 Nakajima B5N; Ikoma class; 18 + 1 Mitsubishi A6M; 27 Aichi D3A; 27 Nakajima B5N; Plan in 1943: 18 + 2 Mitsubishi A7M; 27 Yokosuka D4Y; 6 Nakajima C6N; Plan in August 1944: 27 Mitsubishi A6M; 12 Yokosuka D4Y; 9 Nakajima B6N

The Unryū-class aircraft carriers (雲龍型航空母艦, Unryū-gata Kōkūbokan) were World War II Japanese aircraft carriers. Sixteen ships of the class were planned under the Maru Kyū Programme (Ship #302 in 1941) and the Kai-Maru 5 Programme (#5001–5015 in 1942). However, only three of the Unryū-class carriers were completed. (Note: Two of these ships were canceled to release a slipway and material to convert Shinano into an aircraft carrier.)

== Design ==
In the lead-up to the Pacific War the Imperial Japanese Navy (IJN) attempted to build a large number of fleet carriers. For them to be built quickly, the design for these ships was based on the aircraft carrier Hiryū rather than the newer and more sophisticated Taihō or the Shōkaku class.

The Unryū-class aircraft carrier design was very similar to that of Hiryū. The ships were lightly built, and the main difference from Hiryū was that the carriers' island was placed on the starboard side of the ships. The carriers were capable of carrying 63 aircraft in two hangars, and were fitted with two elevators. The Unryū class carried a smaller quantity of aviation fuel than Hiryū with fuel tanks protected by concrete. The ships were fitted with the same propulsion system used in the aircraft carrier Sōryū to reach 34 knots (63 km/h), though Katsuragi was instead fitted with two turbines of the same type used in destroyers and had a maximum speed of 32 knots (59 km/h). The carriers also had a similar armament as Hiryū and were equipped with two Type 21 radars and two Type 13 radars.

== Construction ==
The first three Unryū-class aircraft carriers were laid down in 1942 and construction of a further three began the next year. Eventually, only three (Unryū, Amagi, and Katsuragi) were completed and construction of the other three carriers (Kasagi, Aso and Ikoma) was abandoned in 1945.

== Ships in classes ==
=== Unryū class ===
Project number was G16. General production model of the Unryū class. 3 carriers were completed. The IJN unofficial designation for Unryū and Amagi were Modified Hiryū class (改飛龍型, Kai Hiryū-gata), Ship Number 5002–5006 were Modified Unryū class (改雲龍型, Kai Unryū-gata) also.

- Unryū (built by Yokosuka Naval Arsenal used the same boilers and turbines as the heavy cruiser Suzuya.
- Amagi and Kasagi (built by Mitsubishi, Nagasaki Shipyard) were equipped with surplus stock of the Ibuki-class cruiser machinery.
- Katsuragi and Aso (built by Kure Naval Arsenal) were equipped with two sets of the Kagerō-class destroyer machinery, because Japanese industrial power became scarce. Dead space was replaced by fuel tanks.
- Ship Number 5002 and 5005 (built by Yokosuka Naval Arsenal) were to have been built simultaneously using Shinano's dock. However, they were cancelled because Shinano was continued.

Construction data
Ship #	Ship	Builder	Laid down	Launched	Completed	Fate
302	Unryū (雲龍)	Yokosuka Naval Arsenal	1 August 1942	25 September 1943	6 August 1944	Sunk by USS Redfish, 19 December 1944.
5001	Amagi (天城)	Mitsubishi-Nagasaki Shipyard	1 October 1942	15 October 1943	10 August 1944	Sunk by air raid, 28 July 1945. Salvaged and scrapped between 5 December 1946 – 12 November 1947.
5002		Yokosuka Naval Arsenal				Cancelled, 1943; materials were used for Shinano.
5003	Katsuragi (葛城)	Kure Naval Arsenal	8 December 1942	19 January 1944	15 October 1944	Scrapped between 22 December 1946 – 30 November 1947.
5004	Kasagi (笠置)	Mitsubishi-Nagasaki Shipyard	14 April 1943	19 October 1944	(June 1945)	84% complete. Construction stopped on 1 April 1945. Scrapped between 1 September 1946 – 31 December 1947.
5005		Yokosuka Naval Arsenal				Cancelled, 1943; materials were used for Shinano.
5006	Aso (阿蘇)	Kure Naval Arsenal	8 June 1943	1 November 1944	(September 1945)	60% complete. Construction stopped on 9 November 1944. Damaged by air raids in July 1945. Scuttled, July 1945. Salvaged and scrapped between 21 December 1946 – 26 April 1947.

=== Ikoma class ===
The Ikoma subclass was a simplified and sped-up construction model of the Unryū class. They were equipped with shift-arrangement machinery (four sets of parallel boilers and one turbine). Therefore, their funnels were intended to be spaced out. The IJN unofficial designation for this class was Modified Ship Number 302-class (改第302号艦型, Kai Dai 302-Gōkan-gata).

Construction data
Ship #	Ship	Builder	Laid down	Launched	Completed	Fate
5007	Ikoma (生駒)	Kawasaki-Kobe Shipyard	5 July 1943	17 November 1944	(October 1945)	60% complete. Construction stopped, 9 November 1944. Scrapped 4 July 1946 – 10 March 1947.
5008	Kurama (鞍馬) or Kaimon (開聞)	Mitsubishi-Nagasaki Shipyard	(November 1943)		(December 1945)	Cancelled on 5 May 1944
5009		Yokosuka Naval Arsenal	(July 1943)		(March 1946)	Cancelled on 11 August 1943
5010		Mitsubishi-Nagasaki Shipyard	(April 1944)		(June 1946)	Cancelled on 11 August 1943
5011		Yokosuka Naval Arsenal	(June 1944)		(September 1946)	Cancelled on 11 August 1943
5012		Kure Naval Arsenal	(June 1944)		(September 1946)	Cancelled on 11 August 1943
5013		Yokosuka Naval Arsenal	(June 1944)		(March 1947)	Cancelled on 11 August 1943
5014		Yokosuka Naval Arsenal	(October 1944)		(September 1947)	Cancelled on 11 August 1943
5015		Yokosuka Naval Arsenal	(January 1945)		(March 1948)	Cancelled on 11 August 1943

== Photos ==
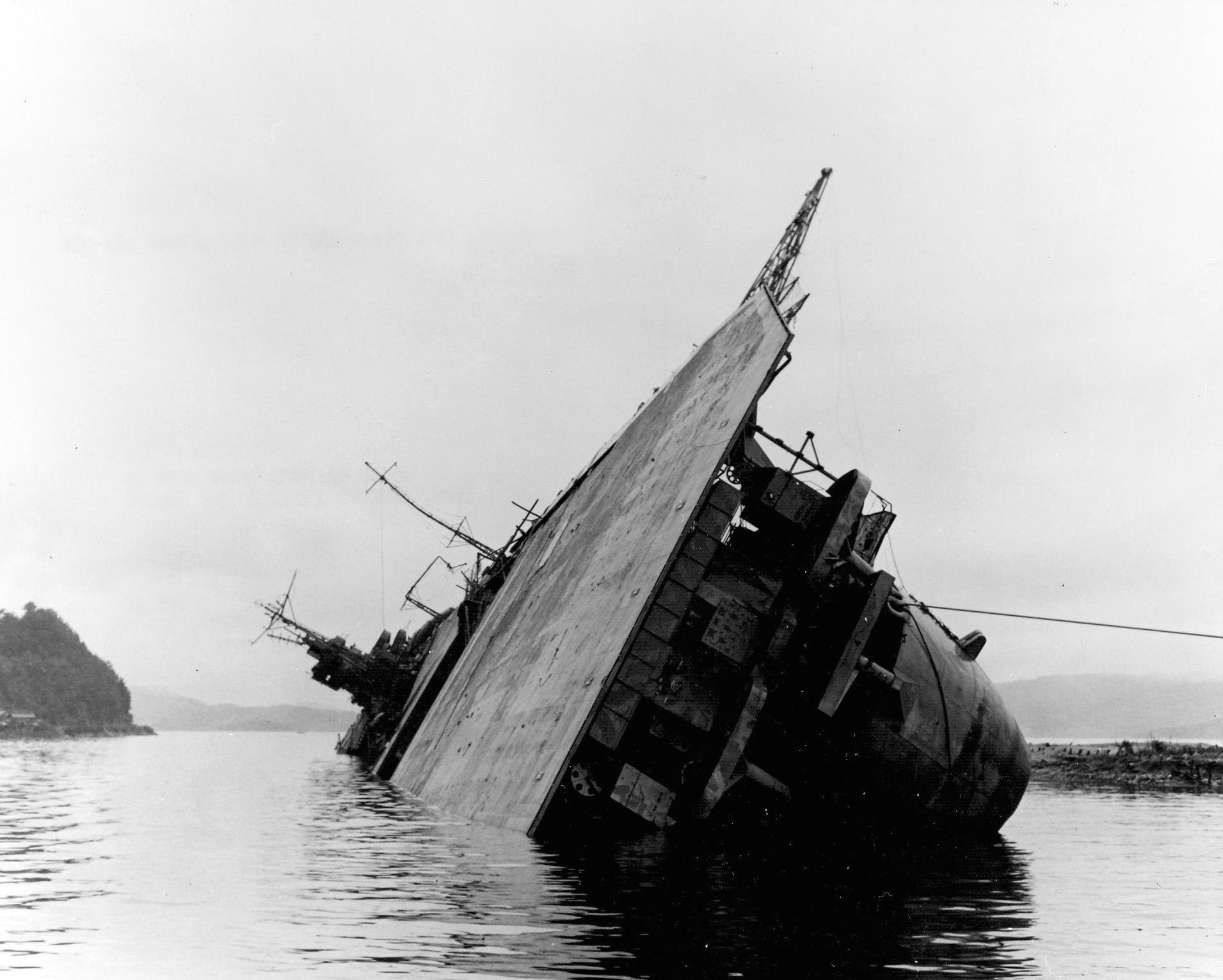
Amagi wrecked at Kure, October 1945

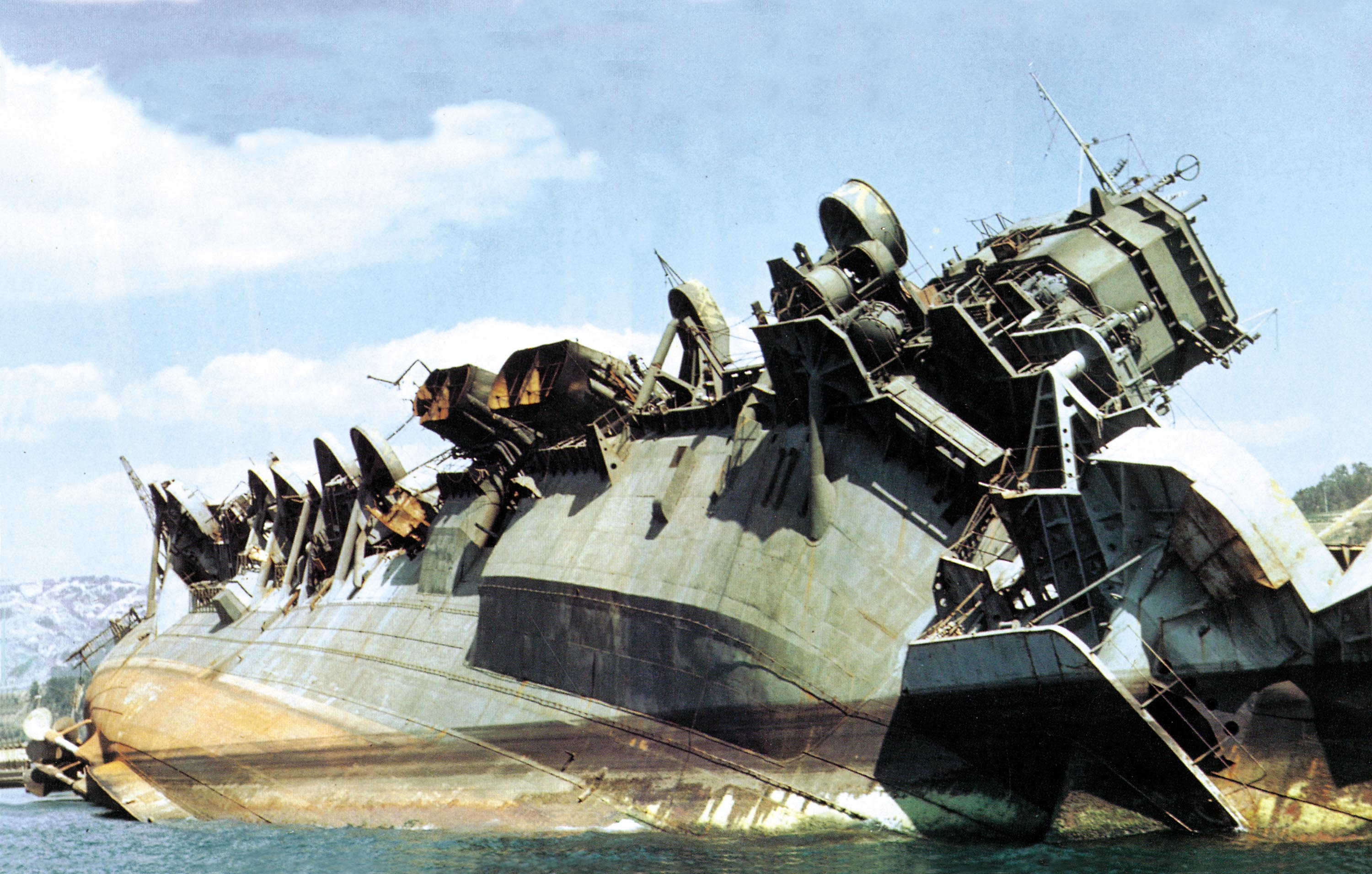
Amagi, August 1946

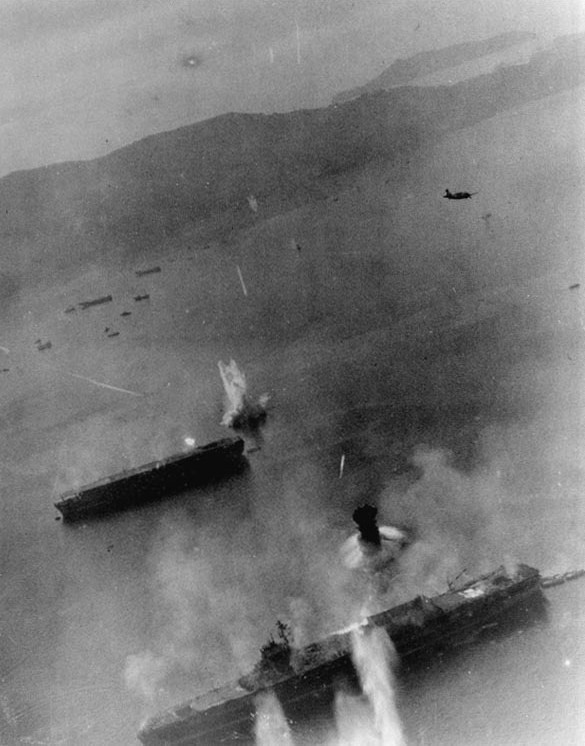
Katsuragi and Kaiyo (above) under attack on 19 March 1945

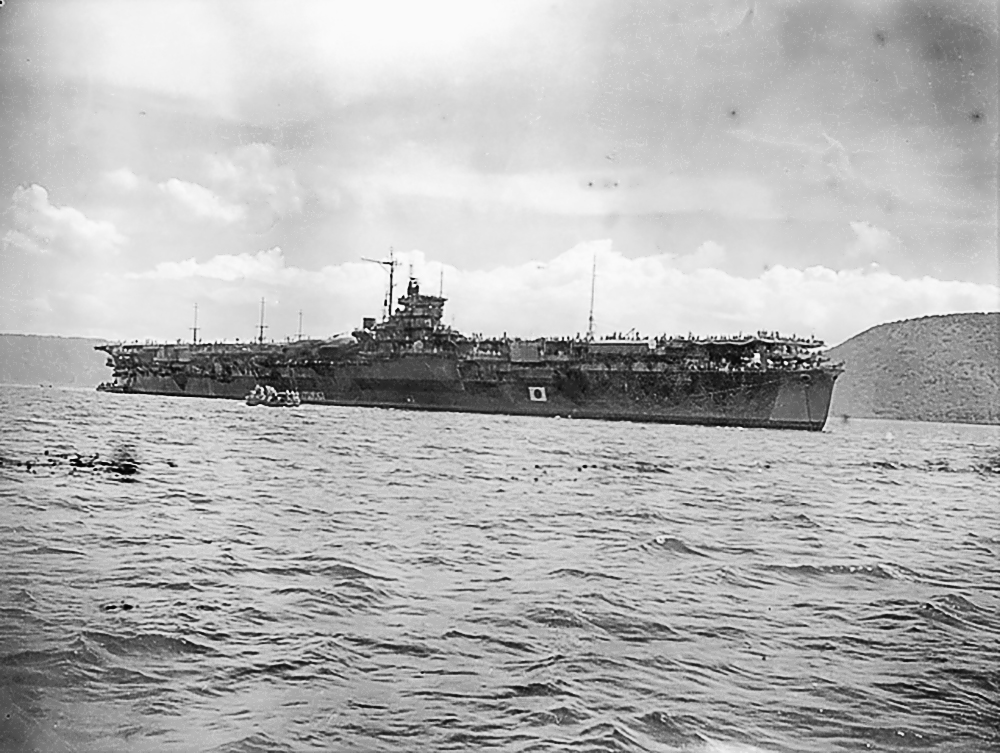
Katsuragi as repatriation transport on 31 January 1946

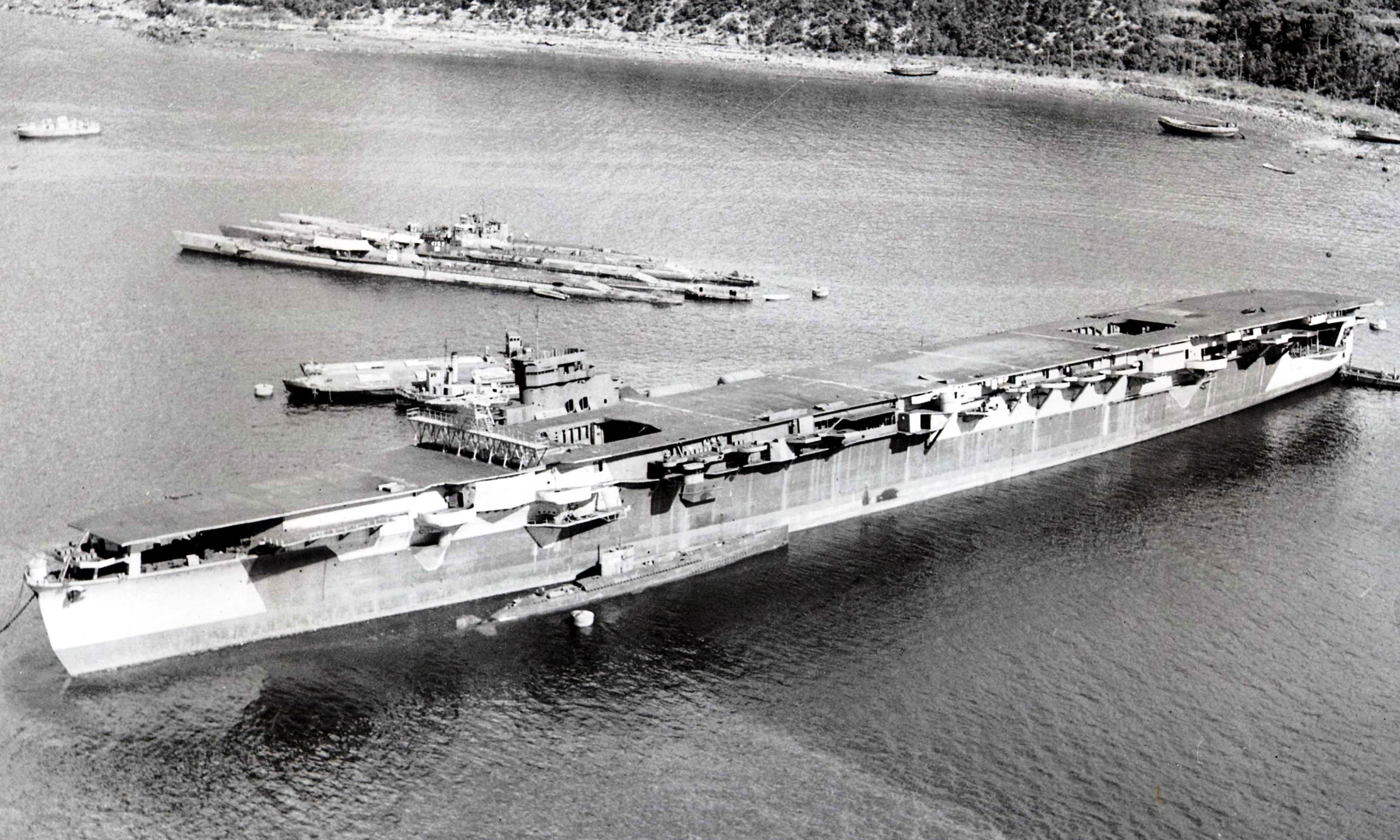
Kasagi, 2 November 1945

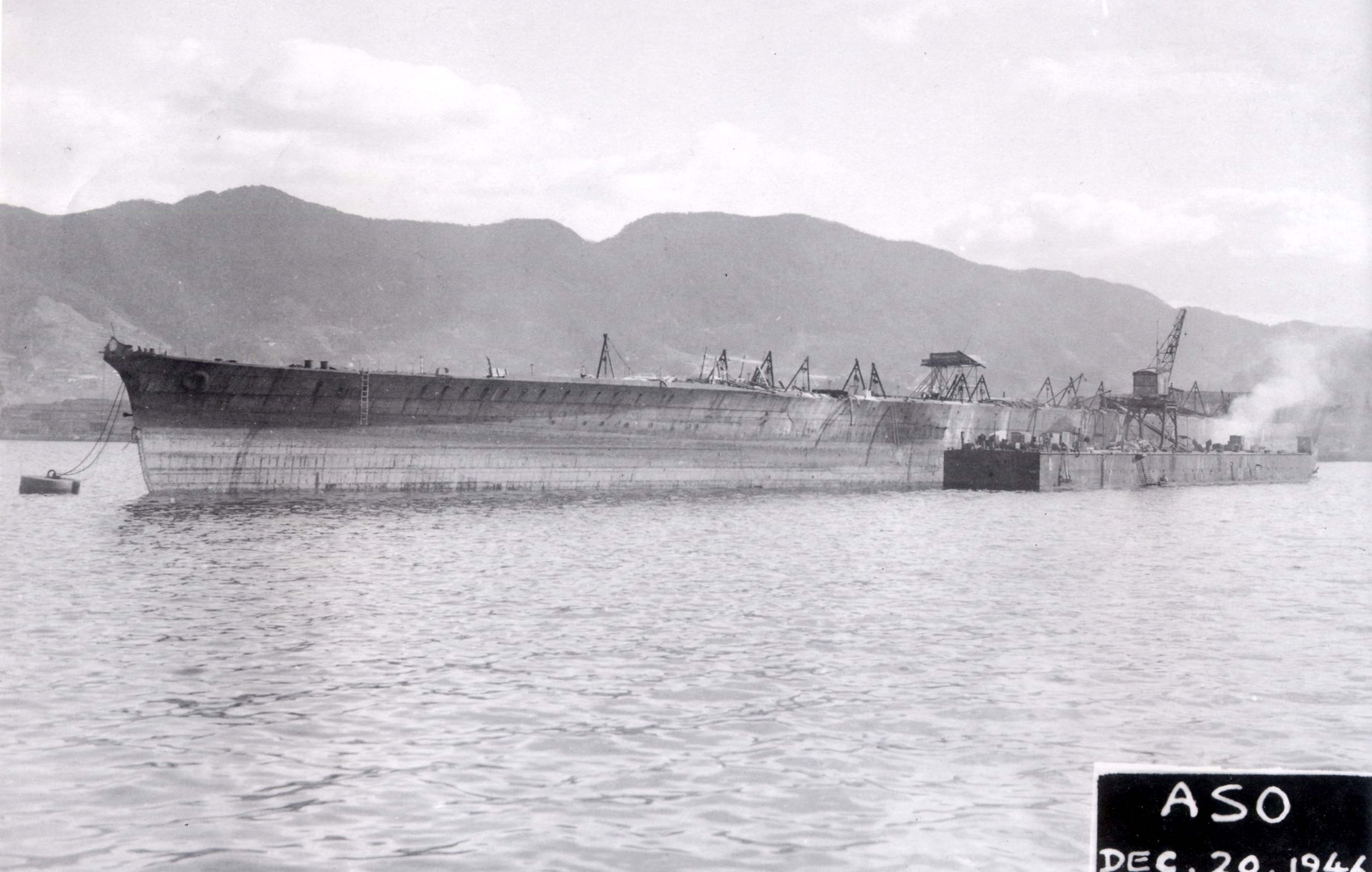
Aso, 20 December 1946

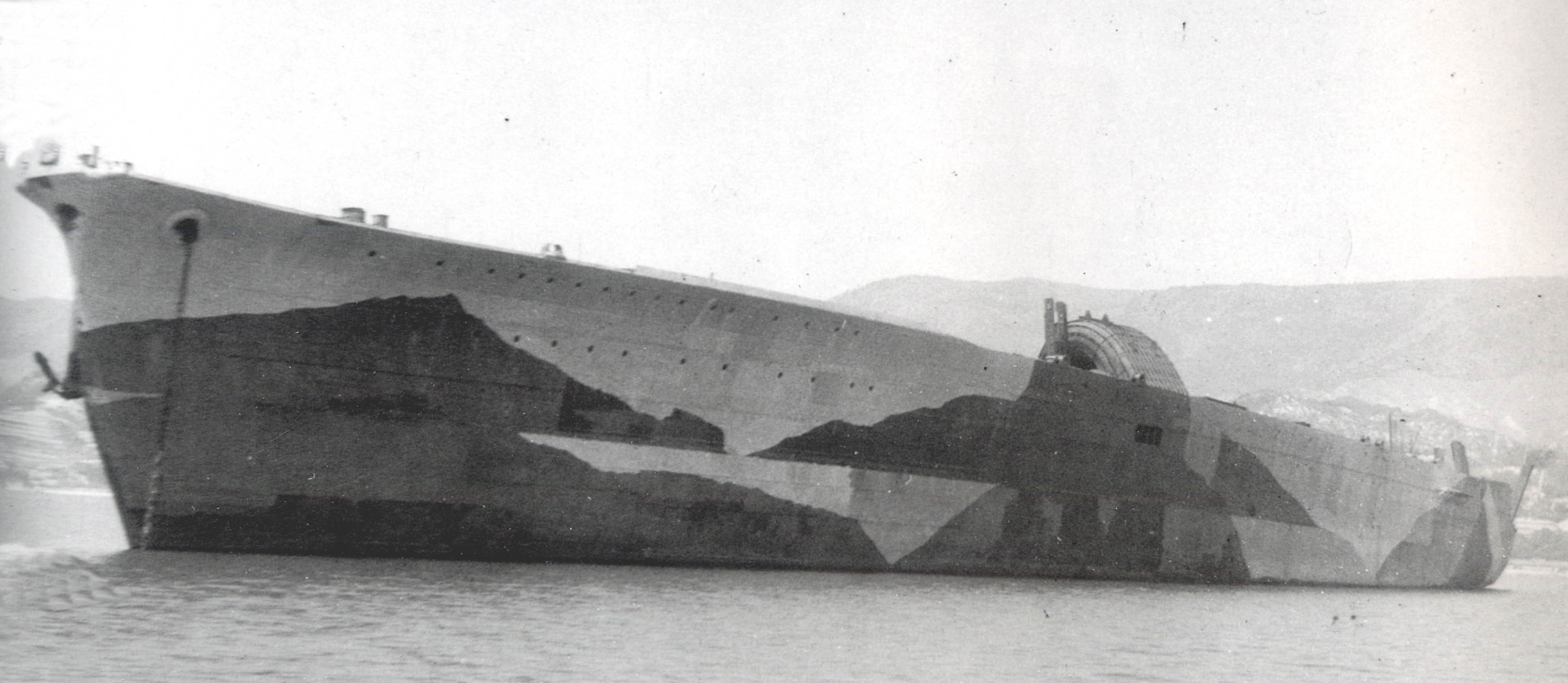
Ikoma, 23 May 1946
