= Tian Cheng International =

Hong Kong auction house

Tiancheng International Auctioneer Limited (Tiancheng International)
- Industry: Auction House
- Founded: 2011
- Headquarters: Hong Kong
- Website: https://www.tianchengauction.com/en/about-tiancheng

Tiancheng International Auctioneer Limited (also known as Tian Cheng International or Tiancheng International) is a niche auction house that specialises in the sale of Chinese art as well as jadeite. Its headquarters is in Hong Kong, with other offices in Shanghai and Beijing.

Although recently established, Tian Cheng International is considered to be a significant auction house given the increase in its market share and high-profile auctions since its inception. However, between the four auction houses of China Guardian, Christie's, Sotheby's and Tian Cheng International, the latter is considered to be the smallest of the four in terms of overall market share in Asia.

== Background ==
Tian Cheng International was founded in 2011. Its market is focused on classical Chinese paintings as well as contemporary Chinese art and paintings.

In particular, jadeite is a stock luxury item auctioned at Tian Cheng International. For example, Tian Cheng International sold US$38 million worth of jadeite in its June 2015 jadeite spring sale and was projected to sell US$45 million worth of jadeite in its June 2013 sale.

Chinese clients account for 50% of Tian Cheng International's client base, with the rest derived from South-East Asia, Taiwan, Singapore, the United States, Russia, and the UK.

== Notable auctions ==
On 15 June 2013, Angelina Jolie auctioned two pieces of jewellery to raise proceeds for her charity Children in Conflict. The first item was a diamond Elise choker which was sourced by her jeweller Robert Procop and used in Jolie's 2010 film The Tourist. The second item was a cushion-shaped emerald ring designed with Robert Procop and worn by Jolie at the premiere of Kung Fu Panda 2.

On 7 December 2014, Cantonese pop-singer Jenny Tseng auctioned 50 items to raise funds for a children's charity, including a natural Jadeite and diamond ring selling for US$378,205.

In 2016, a collection of Kat Florence's jewellery worn by Sarah Jessica Parker was sold for a total of HK$11,561,640 to raise funds for the victims of the 2015 Nepal earthquake. Some of these funds went towards reconstructing a school for 420 children in Pokhara, Nepal.

In May 2016, Tian Cheng International hosted an auction of 280 rare items at its Jewellery and Jadeite Spring Auction 2016, worth about US$28.3 million in total.
