= Amaki =

Amaki is a surname. Notable people with the surname include:

- Amalia Amaki (born 1949), African-American artist, art historian, educator, film critic, and curator
- Jun Amaki (born 1995), Japanese gravure idol
- Sally Amaki (born 2000), American singer and voice actress
