= VF-1 (1943–1945) =

Fighter Squadron 1
- Active: 1 May 1943 – 25 October 1945
- Country: United States
- Branch: United States Navy
- Type: Fighter
- Nickname(s): High Hatters
- Engagements: World War II

Aircraft flown
- Fighter: F6F Hellcat

Fighter Squadron 1 (VF-1) was a fighter squadron of the United States Navy. Originally established as Fighter Squadron 4 (VF-4) on 1 May 1943, it was redesignated VF-1 on 15 July 1943 and disestablished on 25 October 1945. It was the third US Navy squadron to be designated VF-1.

== Operational history ==
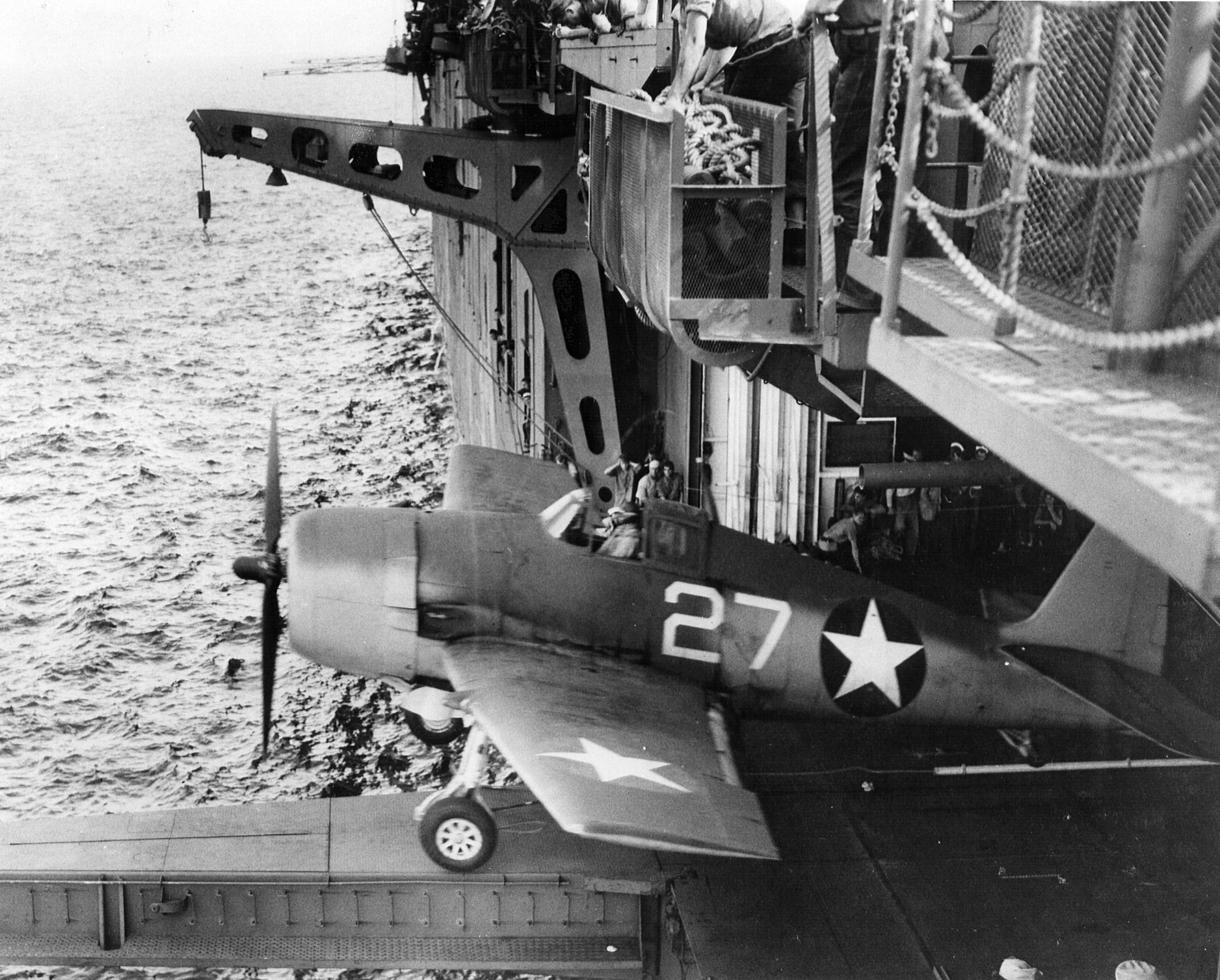
VF-1 F6F-3 launches from the hangar deck catapult of USS Yorktown in June 1943

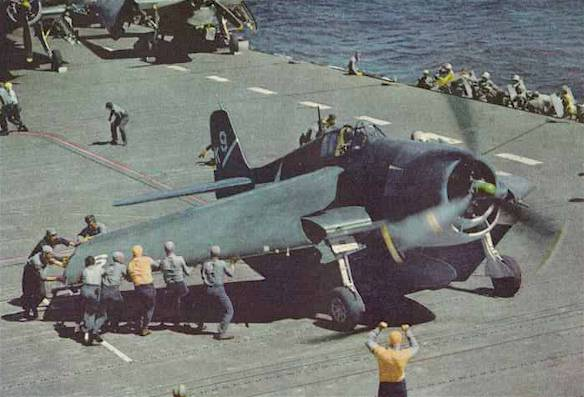
VF-1 F6F-3 aboard USS Yorktown, June 1944

VF-1 operating the Grumman F6F Hellcat was embarked on the USS Yorktown (CV-10) on its shakedown cruise in the Caribbean in June 1943.

VF-1 was transferred to Kaneohe Naval Air Station in August 1943.

VF-1 was assigned with Carrier Air Group 1 (CVG-1) to USS Yorktown from May to August 1944. During this period Yorktown and CVG-1 took part in the Battle of Saipan, 1st Bonin raid, Battle of the Philippine Sea, 2nd & 3rd Bonin raids, retaking of Guam, and raids on Palau, Yap, and Ulithi.

In 1945 VF-1 was assigned to USS Bennington.

CVG-1 joined the ship at Pearl Harbor on 11 May 1944. For the next 18 days, conducted training operations in the Hawaiian Islands. On 29 May, she headed back to the Central Pacific. Yorktown entered Majuro lagoon again on 3 June and began preparations for the Mariana and Palau Islands campaign.

On 6 June, USS Yorktown left Majuro with TF 58 and set a course for the Mariana Islands. After five days steaming, she reached the launch point and began launching CVG-1 planes for the preliminary softening up of targets in preparation for the invasion of Saipan. CVG-1 aircrews concentrated primarily upon airfields located on Guam. Those raids continued until 13 June, when Yorktown, with two of the task groups of TF 58, steamed north to hit targets in the Bonin Islands. That movement resulted in a one-day raid on 16 June before the two task groups headed back to the Marianas to join in the Battle of the Philippine Sea. TF 58 reunited on 18 June and began a short wait for the approaching Japanese Fleet and its aircraft.

On the morning of 19 June, CVG-1 aircraft began strikes on Japanese air bases on Guam in order to deny them to their approaching carrier-based air and to keep the land-based planes out of the fray. Duels with Guam-based aircraft continued until mid-morning. At about 10:17 hrs, however, she got her first indication of the carrier plane attacks when a large bogey appeared on her radar screen. At that point she divided her attention, sending part of her air group back to Guam and another portion of it out to meet the raid closing from the west. Throughout the battle, Yorktown's planes continued to strike the Guam airfields and intercept the carrier raids. During the first day of the Battle of the Philippine Sea, Yorktown aircraft claimed 37 enemy planes destroyed and dropped 21 tons of bombs on the Guam air bases.

On the morning of 20 June, Yorktown steamed generally west with TF 58 while search planes groped for the fleeing enemy task force. Contact was made with the enemy at about 15:40 when a pilot from Hornet spotted the retiring Combined Fleet units. Yorktown launched a 40-plane strike between 16:23 and 16:43. CVG-1 planes found Admiral Jisaburō Ozawa's force at about 18:40 and began a 20-minute attack during which they went after Zuikaku on which they succeeded in scoring some hits. They, however, failed to sink that carrier. They also attacked several other ships in the Japanese force, though no records show a confirmed sinking to the credit of the Yorktown air group. On 21 June, the carrier joined in the futile stern chase on the enemy carried out by TF 58 but gave up that evening when air searches failed to contact the Japanese. Yorktown returned to the Marianas area and resumed air strikes on Pagan Island on 22–23 June. On 24 June, she launched a series of raids on Iwo Jima. On 25 June, she laid in a course for Eniwetok and arrived there two days later. On 30 June, the aircraft carrier headed back to the Marianas and the Bonins. She renewed combat operations on 3–4 July with a series of attacks on Iwo Jima and Chichi Jima. On 6 July, the warship resumed strikes in the Marianas and continued them for the next 17 days. On 23 July, she headed off to the west for a series of raids on Yap, Ulithi, and the Palaus. She carried out those attacks on 25 July and arrived back in the Marianas on 29 July.

On 31 July, she cleared the Mariana Islands and headed—via Eniwetok and Pearl Harbor—back to the United States where CVG-1 left the carrier.

On 15 December, LCDR M. C. Hoffman assumed command and led the first flight onto action against Hyakurigahara and Tsukuba Airfields north of Tokyo on 10 July 1945. During the short combat period which followed, ending 15 August 1945, the pilots of VF-1 destroyed 38 enemy aircraft and damaged 123. The squadron participated in the attack on Yokosuka Naval Base, and a VF-1 pilot scored a direct hit on the Japanese battleship Nagato. The squadron participated in attacks on the Kure Naval Base which resulted in the sinking of the Japanese battleship Hyuga, a destroyer and a destroyer-escort. Crippling damage was done to the battleship Ise, two carriers Amagi and Katsuragi, two cruisers Aoba and Oyoda, and numerous smaller warships. After the hostilities ended, the squadron was assigned the important task of searching for POW camps in northern Honshu and escorting Torpedo Planes on their vital supply dropping missions.

== See also ==
- History of the United States Navy
- List of inactive United States Navy aircraft squadrons
- List of United States Navy aircraft squadrons
