= Japanese battleship Ise =

Ise-class battleship

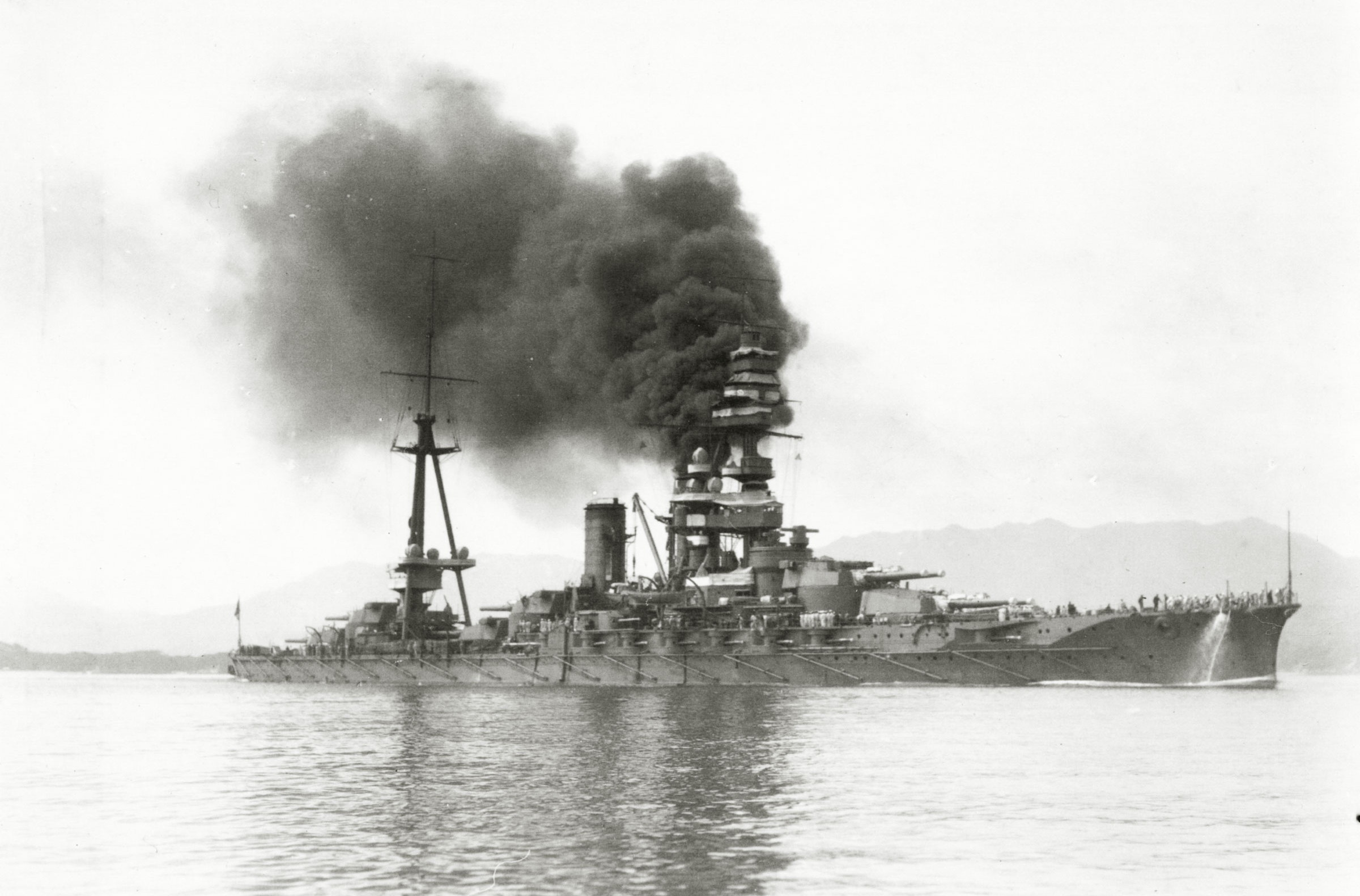
- Ise, late 1920s

History

Empire of Japan
- Name: Ise
- Namesake: Ise Province
- Ordered: 11 April 1913
- Builder: Kawasaki, Kobe
- Laid down: 10 May 1915
- Launched: 12 November 1916
- Completed: 15 December 1917
- Stricken: 20 November 1945
- Fate: Sunk by air attack, 28 July 1945, and subsequently scrapped

General characteristics (as built)
- Class & type: Ise-class battleship
- Displacement: 29,980 long tons (30,460 t) (standard); 36,500 long tons (37,100 t) (deep load)
- Length: 208.18 m (683 ft) (o.a.)
- Beam: 28.65 m (94 ft)
- Draught: 8.93 m (29 ft 4 in)
- Installed power: 24 × water-tube boilers; 45,000 shp (34,000 kW)
- Propulsion: 4 × shafts; 2 × steam turbine sets
- Speed: 23 knots (43 km/h; 26 mph)
- Range: 9,680 nmi (17,930 km; 11,140 mi) at 14 knots (26 km/h; 16 mph)
- Complement: 1,360
- Armament: 6 × twin 35.6 cm (14 in) guns; 20 × single 14 cm (5.5 in) guns; 4 × single 7.62 cm (3 in) AA guns; 6 × 53.3 cm (21 in) torpedo tubes
- Armour: Belt: 299 mm (11.8 in); Decks: 85 mm (3.3 in); Turrets: 254 mm (10 in)

General characteristics (after first reconstruction)
- Displacement: 42,001 long tons (42,675 t) (full load)
- Length: 215.8 m (708 ft)
- Beam: 31.75 m (104 ft 2 in)
- Draught: 9.45 m (31 ft)
- Installed power: 8 × water-tube boilers; 80,000 shp (60,000 kW)
- Propulsion: 4 × steam turbine sets
- Speed: 24.5 knots (45.4 km/h; 28.2 mph)
- Range: 7,870 nmi (14,580 km; 9,060 mi) at 16 knots (30 km/h; 18 mph)
- Complement: 1,376
- Armament: 6 × twin 35.6 cm (14 in) guns; 16 × single 14 cm (5.5 in) guns; 4 × twin 12.7 cm (5 in) DP guns; 10 × twin 2.5 cm (1 in) AA guns
- Armour: Decks: 152 mm (6 in)
- Aircraft carried: 3
- Aviation facilities: 1 catapult

General characteristics (as hybrid carrier, 1945)
- Displacement: 39,805 long tons (40,444 t) (full load)
- Length: 219.62 m (720 ft 6 in)
- Beam: 31.71 m (104 ft)
- Draught: 9.03 m (29 ft 8 in)
- Range: 9,500 nmi (17,600 km; 10,900 mi) at 16 knots
- Complement: 1,463
- Sensors & processing systems: 1 × Type 21 air-search radar; 2 × Type 13 early-warning radars; 2 × Type 22 surface-search radars
- Armament: 4 × twin 35.6 cm guns; 8 × twin 12.7 cm DP guns; 31 × triple, 11 × single 2.5 cm AA guns; 6 × 30-round 12.7 cm AA rocket launchers
- Aircraft carried: 22–24
- Aviation facilities: 2 catapults

Ise (Japanese: 伊勢; named after the ancient Ise Province) was the lead ship of her class of two dreadnought battleships built for the Imperial Japanese Navy (IJN) during the 1910s. Although completed in 1917, she played no role in World War I. Ise supported Japanese forces in the early 1920s during the Siberian Intervention in the Russian Civil War. In 1923, she assisted survivors of the Great Kantō earthquake. The ship was partially modernised in two stages in 1928–1929 and 1931–1932, during which her forward superstructure was rebuilt in the pagoda mast style. Ise was reconstructed in 1934–1937, with improvements to her armour and her propulsion machinery. Afterwards she played a minor role in the Second Sino-Japanese War.

Despite the expensive reconstruction, the ship was considered obsolete by the eve of the Pacific War, and did not see significant action in the early years of the war. Following the loss of most of the IJN's large aircraft carriers during the Battle of Midway in mid-1942, she was rebuilt with a flight deck replacing the rear pair of gun turrets to give her the ability to operate an air group of floatplanes; lack of aircraft and qualified pilots meant that Ise never actually operated aircraft in combat. She participated in the Battle off Cape Engaño in late 1944, where she was one of the ships that decoyed the American carrier fleet supporting the invasion of Leyte away from the landing beaches. Afterwards the ship was transferred to Southeast Asia. In early 1945 Ise participated in Operation Kita, where she transported petrol and other strategic materials to Japan. The ship was then reduced to reserve until American airstrikes in July sank her. After the war Ise was scrapped in 1946–1947.

== Design and description ==
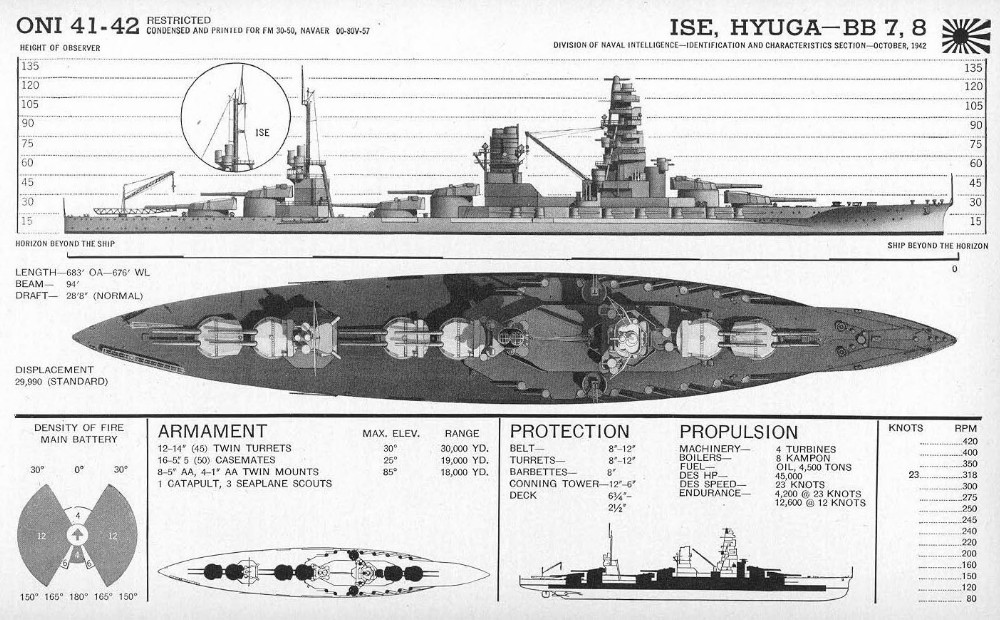
American ship-recognition drawing of the Ise-class battleships before their conversion

The Ise class was designed as an improved version of the preceding Fusō class. The ships had a length of 208.18 metres (683 ft) overall, a beam of 28.65 metres (94 ft) and a draught of 8.93 metres (29 ft 4 in) at deep load. They displaced 29,980 long tons (30,460 t) at standard load and 36,500 long tons (37,100 t) at deep load, roughly 650 long tons (660 t) more than the earlier ships. Their crew consisted of 1,360 officers and ratings.

During the ships' modernisation in the 1930s, their forward superstructure was enlarged with multiple platforms added to their tripod masts to create a pagoda mast. Both ships were also given torpedo bulges to improve their underwater protection and to compensate for the weight of the extra armour. These changes increased their overall length to 215.8 metres (708 ft), their beam to 31.75 metres (104 ft 2 in) and their draught to 9.45 metres (31 ft). Their displacement increased by over 5,000 long tons (5,100 t) to 42,001 long tons (42,675 t) at deep load. The crew now numbered 1,376 officers and enlisted men.

=== Propulsion ===
The Ise-class ships had two sets of direct-drive steam turbines, each of which drove two propeller shafts, using steam provided by 24 Kampon Ro Gō water-tube boilers. The turbines were designed to produce a total of 45,000 shaft horsepower (34,000 kW) and give the ships a speed of 23 knots (43 km/h; 26 mph). Ise reached 23.6 knots (43.7 km/h; 27.2 mph) from 56,498 shp (42,131 kW) during her sea trials. Each of the boilers consumed a mixture of coal and oil, and the ships carried enough of both to give them a range of 9,680 nautical miles (17,930 km; 11,140 mi) at a speed of 14 knots (26 km/h; 16 mph).

During their 1930s modernisation, the boilers on each ship were replaced by eight new Kampon oil-fired boilers. The turbines were replaced by four geared Kampon turbines with a designed output of 80,000 shp (60,000 kW) intended to increase their speed to 24.5 knots (45.4 km/h; 28.2 mph). On her trials, Ise reached a top speed of 25.3 knots (46.9 km/h; 29.1 mph) from 81,050 shp (60,440 kW). The fuel storage of the ships was increased, which gave them a range of 7,870 nautical miles (14,580 km; 9,060 mi) at a speed of 16 knots (30 km/h; 18 mph), despite the additional weight.

=== Armament ===
The twelve 35.6-centimetre (14 in) Type 41 guns of the Ise class were mounted in three pairs of twin-gun, superfiring turrets that were numbered one through six from front to rear. The first pair was forward of the main superstructure, the second pair was amidships, and the last ones were aft of the rear superstructure. The ships' secondary armament consisted of twenty 14-centimetre (5.5 in) Type 3 guns in single mounts. Eighteen of these were mounted in casemates in the forecastle and superstructure and the remaining pair were mounted on the deck above them and protected by gun shields. (Note: Jentschura, Jung & Mickel also credit the ships with a dozen 8 cm 3rd Year Type guns, but these were actually shorter and lighter 8 cm Type 41 saluting guns that could be used by the ships' boats and landing parties ashore.) Anti-aircraft defence was provided by four 3rd Year Type 8-centimetre (3 in) (Note: These guns were licence-built British quick-firing (QF) QF 12-pounder guns. While the Japanese designated them as 8 cm, their actual calibre was 76.2 mm.) anti-aircraft (AA) guns in single mounts. The ships were also fitted with six submerged 53.3-centimetre (21 in) torpedo tubes, three on each broadside.

In 1931–1933 the AA guns were replaced with eight 12.7-centimetre (5 in) Type 89 dual-purpose guns, placed beside the forward superstructure in four twin-gun mounts. Two twin-gun mounts for licence-built Vickers two-pounder (4-centimetre (1.6 in)) light AA guns were also added, while the pair of 14 cm guns on the upper deck were removed.

During the mid-1930s reconstruction, the torpedo tubes were removed and the Vickers two-pounders were replaced by 20 licence-built Hotchkiss 2.5-centimetre (1 in) Type 96 light AA guns in 10 twin-gun mounts. This was the standard Japanese light AA gun during World War II, but it suffered from serious design shortcomings that heavily reduced its effectiveness. According to historian Mark Stille, the twin and triple mounts "lacked sufficient speed in train or elevation; the gun sights were unable to handle fast targets; the gun exhibited excessive vibration; the magazine was too small, and, finally, the gun produced excessive muzzle blast". During the reconstruction the forward pair of 14-centimetre guns in the forecastle were removed and the maximum elevation of the remaining guns was increased to +30 degrees.

=== Protection ===
The Ise-class ships' waterline protective belt had a maximum thickness of 299 mm (11.8 in) of Vickers cemented armour amidships; below it was a strake of 100 mm (3.9 in) armour. The upper armoured deck consisted of two layers of high-tensile steel totaling 55 mm (2.2 in) thick and the lower armoured deck also consisted of two layers of high-tensile steel, but only 30 mm (1.2 in) thick in total. The turrets were protected with an armour thickness of 254 mm (10 in) on the face and 76 mm on the roof. The casemate armour was 149 mm (5.9 in) thick and that of the barbettes was 299 mm thick rather than the originally planned 305 mm. (Note: Sources contradict each other regarding the armour scheme of these ships. Lengerer, the most recent researcher using Japanese sources, has been followed rather than older sources.)

=== Fire control and sensors ===
While the details of the ship's fire-control instruments are not fully available, Ise was fitted with a gunnery director after completion. In the late 1920s the fire-control systems were upgraded and additional platforms were added to the foremast to accommodate them. A pair of directors for the 12.7 cm AA guns were added in the early 1930s, one on each side of the forward superstructure. The fire-control systems were again upgraded in the mid-1930s and directors were added for the 2.5 cm AA guns. The ship had a 10-metre (32 ft 10 in) rangefinder installed at the top of the pagoda mast at that time. Type 21 air-search radars were installed aboard the ship in mid-1942.

=== Aircraft ===
Ise was briefly fitted with an aircraft flying-off platform for a Mitsubishi 1MF3 fighter on Turret No. 2 in 1927. It was replaced by a platform on Turret No. 5 for a Yokosuka E1Y reconnaissance floatplane in 1928–1929. A catapult and a collapsible crane were fitted on the stern during the mid-1930s modernisation, and the ship was equipped to operate three floatplanes, although no hangar was provided. The initial Nakajima E4N2 biplanes were replaced by Nakajima E8N2 biplanes in 1938.

== Construction and career ==
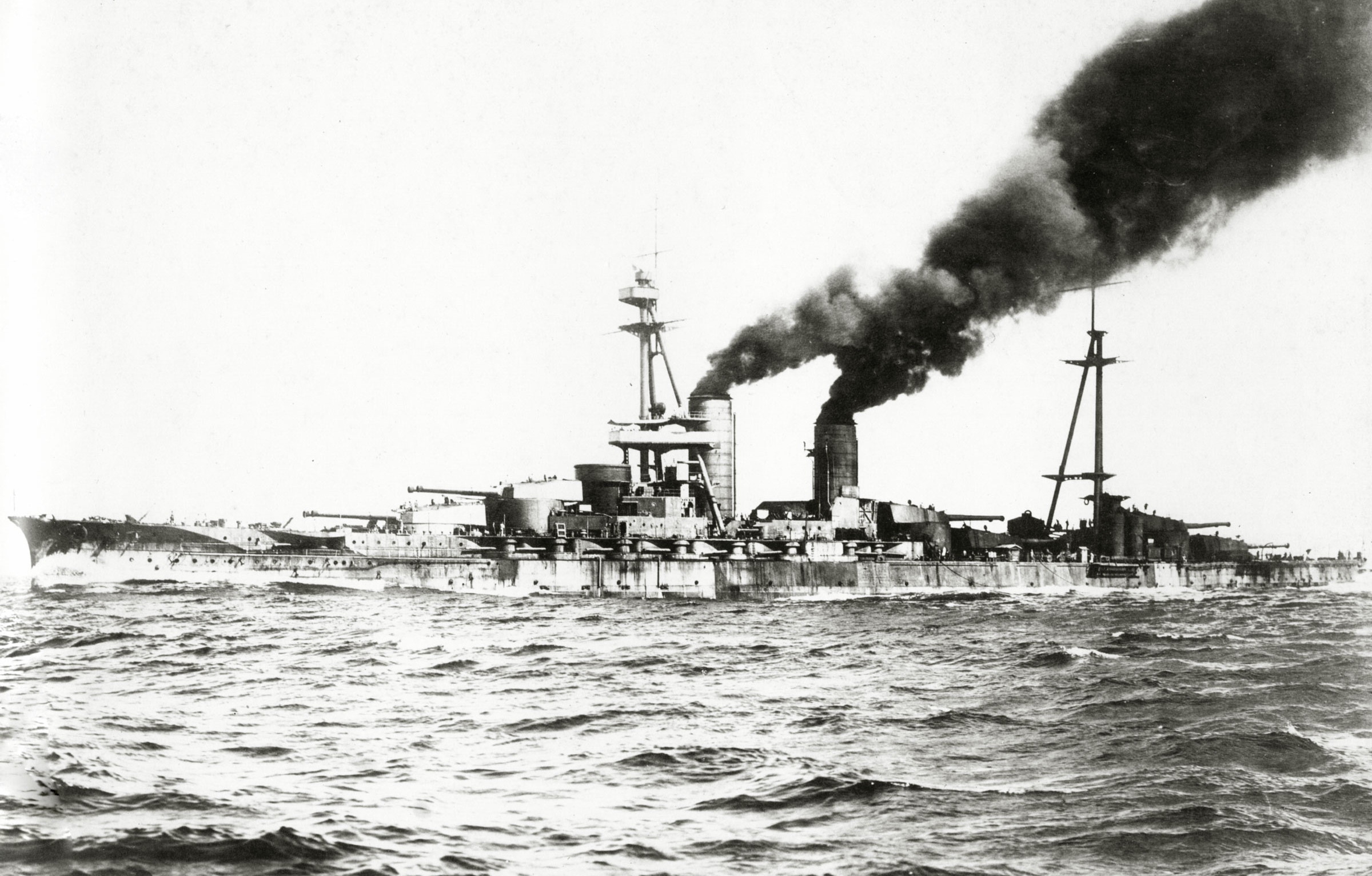
Ise underway, shortly after completion

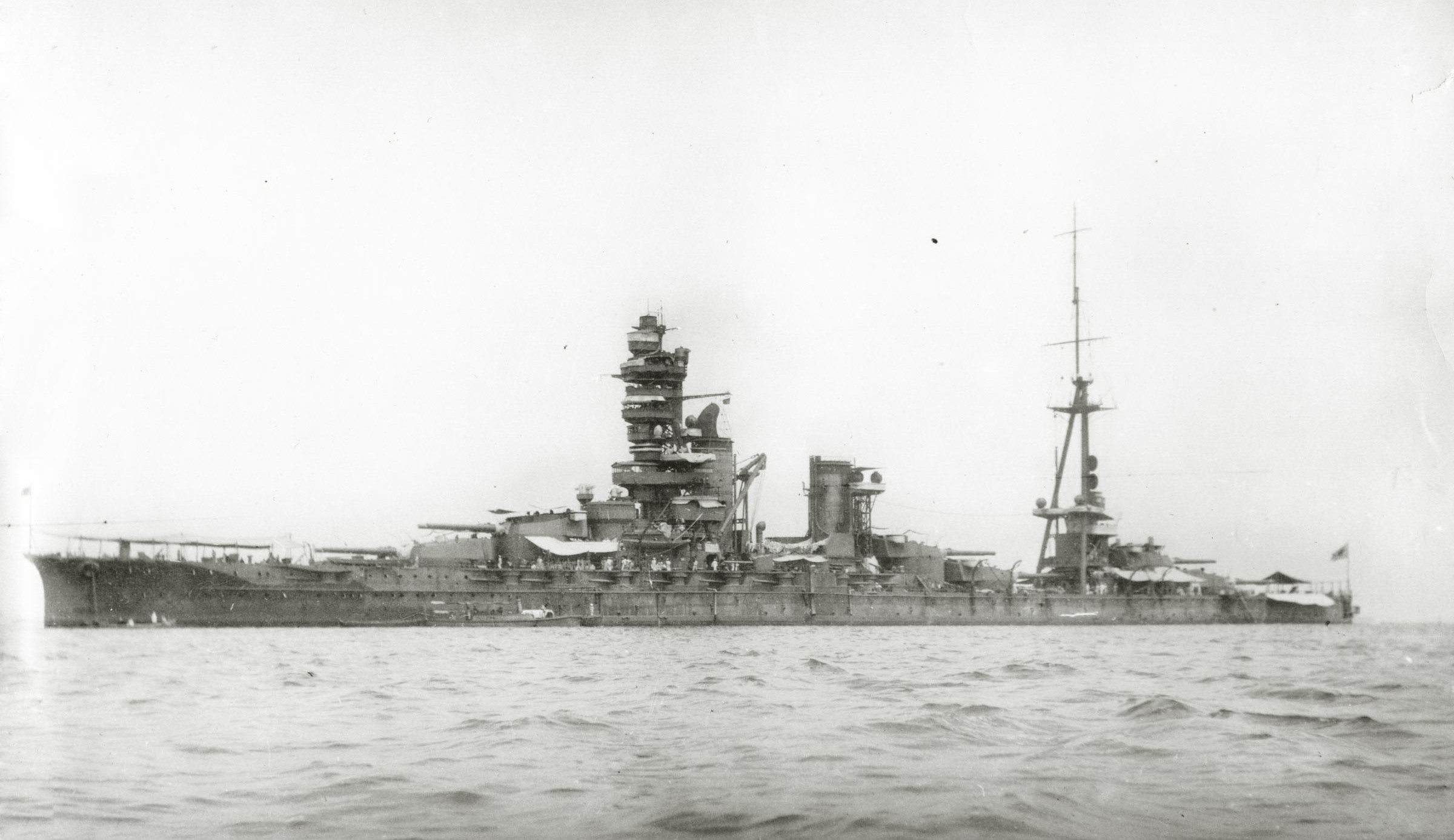
Ise at anchor, before her 1935 reconstruction

Ise, named after Ise Province, one of the traditional provinces of Japan, was laid down at the Kawasaki Heavy Industries shipyard in Kobe on 5 May 1915 and launched on 12 November 1916. Captain Akizawa Yoshima assumed command on 1 December and the ship was completed on 15 December 1917, too late for service in World War I. Ise was assigned to the 1st Division of the 1st Fleet in 1917–1918. Captain Kuwashima Shozo relieved Akizawa on 1 December 1918 and he was relieved in his turn by Captain Furukawa Hiroshi on 20 November 1919. On 29 August 1920, the ship began the first of numerous patrols off the Siberian coast and in northern waters in support of Japan's Siberian Intervention against the Bolshevik Red Army. Captain Yokoo Hisashi replaced Furukawa on 20 November and he was replaced by Captain Nagasawa Naotaro in his turn on 1 December 1921.

On 12 April 1922, while at Yokohama, Ise hosted a delegation which included the Prince of Wales (the future King Edward VIII), and his second cousin, the future Lord Mountbatten of Burma. Captain Kanna Norikazu relieved Nagasawa on 1 December. The ship aided survivors of the Great Kantō earthquake in September 1923. From the early 1920s through the late 1930s, Ise mostly cruised off the coast of China. Little detailed information is available about her activities during the 1920s, although she helped sink the obsolete destroyer Yayoi during gunnery training on 10 August 1926. The ship was overhauled in 1928–1929, during which her forward superstructure was enlarged and her aviation facilities improved.

Between 20 November 1931 and 10 February 1932, Ise had her anti-aircraft armament entirely replaced, her forward superstructure was further enlarged so that it became a pagoda mast, and her stern was modified in preparation for a catapult and crane at Kure Naval Arsenal. These were installed between 14 May and 6 June 1933. On 15 November, she became a training ship. Ise's crew participated in the state funeral of Marshal-Admiral The Marquis Tōgō Heihachirō, victor of the 1905 Battle of Tsushima, on 15 June 1934.

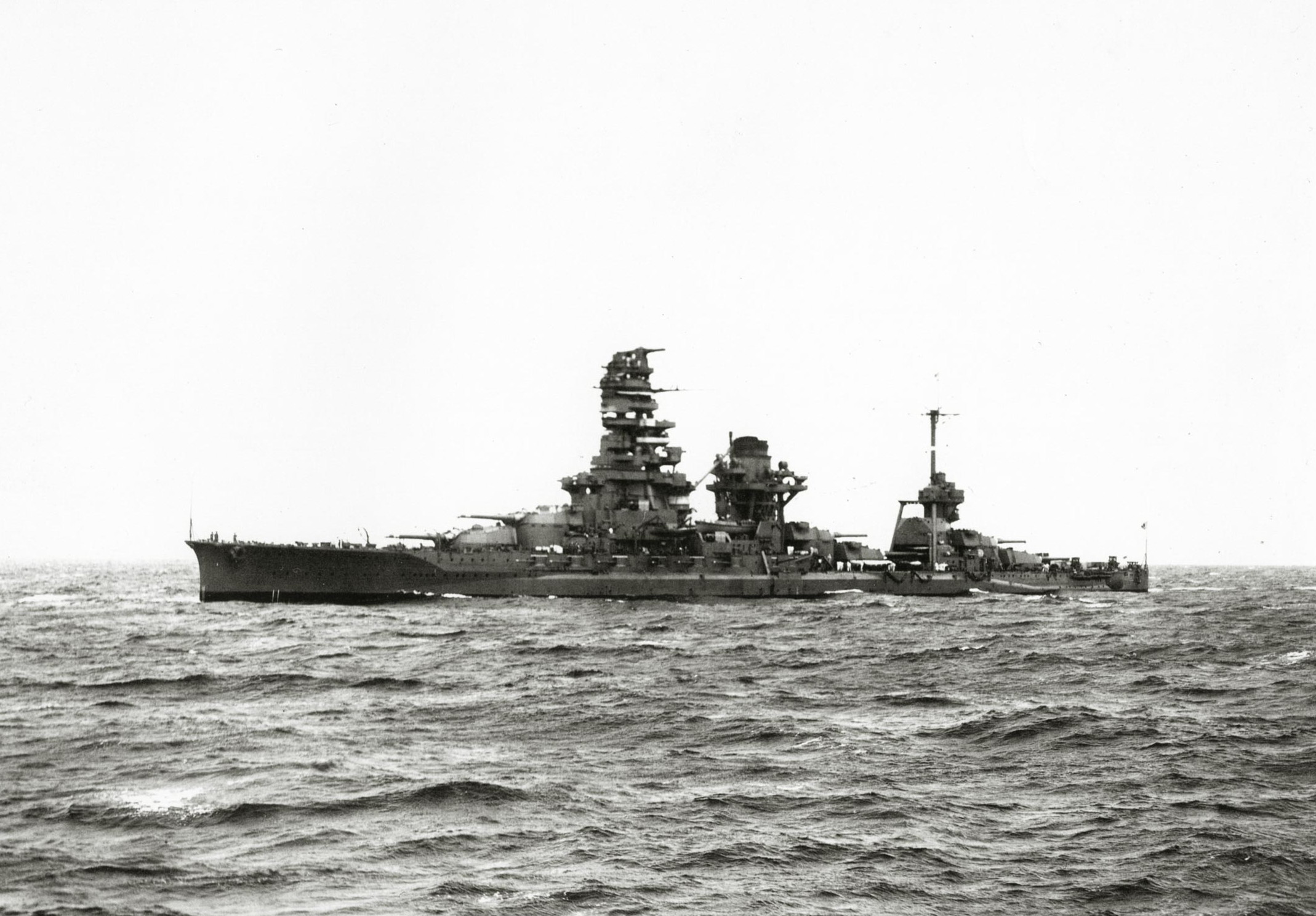
Ise after her 1935–1937 reconstruction

Beginning on 1 August 1935, Ise was drydocked at Kure Naval Arsenal and underwent an extensive reconstruction and modernisation that lasted until 23 March 1937. On 9 April 1938, the ship began the first of her patrols off the southern Chinese coast during the Second Sino-Japanese War that lasted until early 1941. She was transferred to the 2nd Division of the 1st Fleet on 15 November 1940 and became its flagship on 15 November 1941. Captain Takeda Isamu assumed command of Ise on 25 September 1941.

=== Start of the Pacific War ===
To provide distant support for the 1st Air Fleet attacking Pearl Harbor on 8 December, (Note: Japan Standard Time is 19 hours ahead of Hawaiian Standard Time, so in Japan, the attack on Pearl Harbor happened on 8 December.) the division, reinforced by the battleships Nagato and Mutsu and the light carrier Hōshō, sortied from Hashirajima to the Bonin Islands and returned six days later. Ise had a minor refit at the Kure Naval Arsenal in 19–25 February 1942. Together with the rest of the division, she pursued, but did not catch, the American carrier force that had launched the Doolittle Raid on 18 April. On 11 May Ise had an accident which flooded her No. 2 engine room. While under repair, the ship was fitted with one of the first experimental Type 21 early-warning radar sets in the IJN, but it was removed shortly afterwards.

Ise and the rest of the 2nd Battleship Division set sail on 28 May with the Aleutian Support Group at the same time most of the Imperial Fleet began an attack on Midway Island (Operation MI). Commanded by Vice-Admiral Shirō Takasu, the division was composed of Japan's four oldest battleships, including Ise, accompanied by two light cruisers, 12 destroyers, and two oilers. Official records do not show the division as part of the larger Midway operation, known as Operation AL; they were to accompany the fleet under Admiral Isoroku Yamamoto, but were only to provide support to the Aleutian task force if needed.

=== Conversion to a hybrid carrier ===
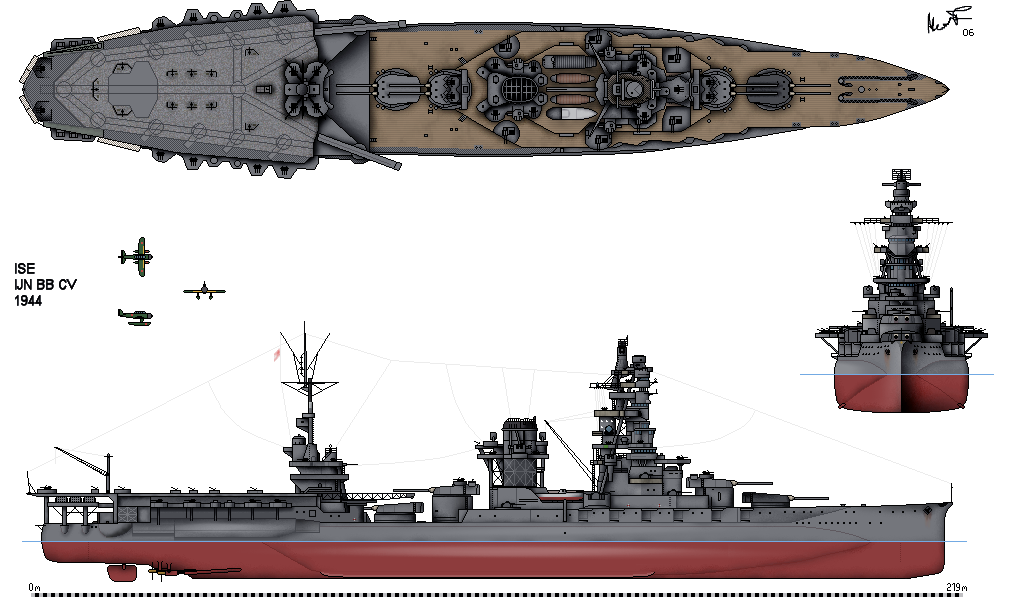
Ise after 1944 reconstruction

The loss of four Japanese aircraft carriers during the Battle of Midway in June severely limited the ability of the IJN to conduct operations and alternatives were sought. Plans for full conversions of battleships into aircraft carriers were rejected on the grounds of expense and, more critically, time, so the IJN settled on removing the rear pair of turrets from the Ise-class ships and replacing them with a flight deck equipped with two rotating catapults. Ise began her conversion on 23 February 1943 and Takeda was relieved by Captain Hase Shinzaburo on 25 April. The ship's No. 5 and No. 6 turrets were replaced by a hangar surmounted by a flight deck. This was not long enough to permit the launch of aircraft or their recovery. Two catapults were installed and the existing crane was moved to the flight deck. The deck was fitted with an extensive system of rails to link each catapult, the storage positions on the deck and the T-shaped aircraft lift that moved aircraft between the flight deck and the hangar. It had a capacity of nine aircraft, the remainder being stowed on deck and one on each catapult for a total of 22–24. The ship's air group was intended to consist of a dozen each Yokosuka D4Y Suisei dive bombers (Allied reporting name "Judy"), modified for catapult launching, and Aichi E16A reconnaissance aircraft (Allied reporting name "Paul"). The former had to land either on a conventional carrier or on land bases, whereas the E16A could be hoisted back aboard using a crane, after landing on the water near the ship.

During the conversion, all the 14 cm guns were removed and the ship's anti-aircraft suite was heavily reinforced. The eight 12.7 cm Type 89 guns were supplemented with four additional twin mounts and the existing 2.5 cm Type 96 AA twin-gun mounts were replaced by 19 triple-gun mounts for a total of 57 weapons.

These changes increased the ship's overall length to 219.62 metres (720 ft 6 in) and the removal of the heavy gun turrets and their barbettes reduced her displacement to 39,805 long tons (40,444 t) at deep load, despite the addition of more fuel oil storage. The extra fuel increased Ise's range to 9,500 nautical miles (17,600 km; 10,900 mi). The weight reductions decreased her draught to 9.03 metres (29 ft 8 in). The crew now numbered 1,463 officers and enlisted men.

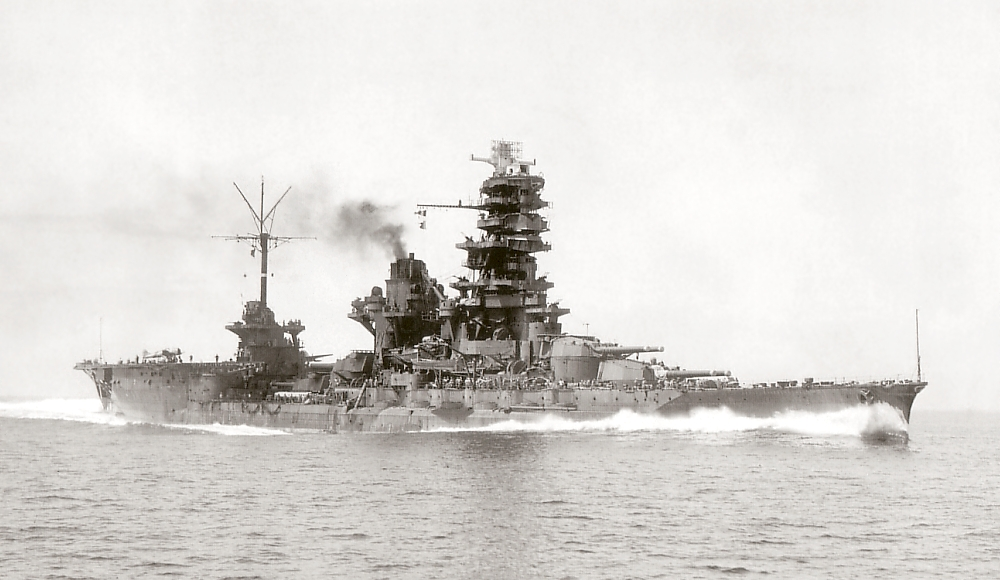
Ise on her sea trials after reconstruction, 24 August 1943

The rebuild was officially completed on 8 October 1943 and Ise made a sortie to Truk later that month, conveying a detachment of the 52nd Division and supplies. Hase was promoted to rear admiral on 1 November and the ship began formally working up 10 days later. Captain Nakase Noboru relieved Hase on 25 December.

On 25 February 1944, Battleship Division 2 was assigned to the direct control of the Combined Fleet. Ise and her sister ship Hyūga were transferred to the Third Fleet and assigned to the newly reformed Fourth Carrier Division on 1 May, commanded by Rear Admiral Chiaki Matsuda. That same day the 634th Naval Air Group was formed and assigned to the Fourth Carrier Division. On 24 May, a pair of Type 22 surface-search radars were installed aboard the ship. From 31 May to 7 June, Ise's light anti-aircraft armament was reinforced with 47 additional Type 96 AA guns in 12 triple and 11 single mounts, which brought her total to 104 guns. Two Type 2 IFF units were also installed.

On 23 June, the sisters conducted their first catapult training, each with four D4Ys and six E16As aboard; subsequent sessions were conducted on 21 July and 31 August. A pair of Type 13 early-warning radars and an E27 radar detector were installed from 22 to 26 July. From 28 September to 10 October, six racks of 30-tube 12.7 cm anti-aircraft rocket launchers were added. Training of the D4Y and E16A aircrew was slowed by technical problems and was generally conducted from land bases. By 1 October the 634th had on strength 17 D4Ys, of which 6 were serviceable, and 18 E16As, of which 16 were operable.

=== Battle off Cape Engaño and afterwards ===
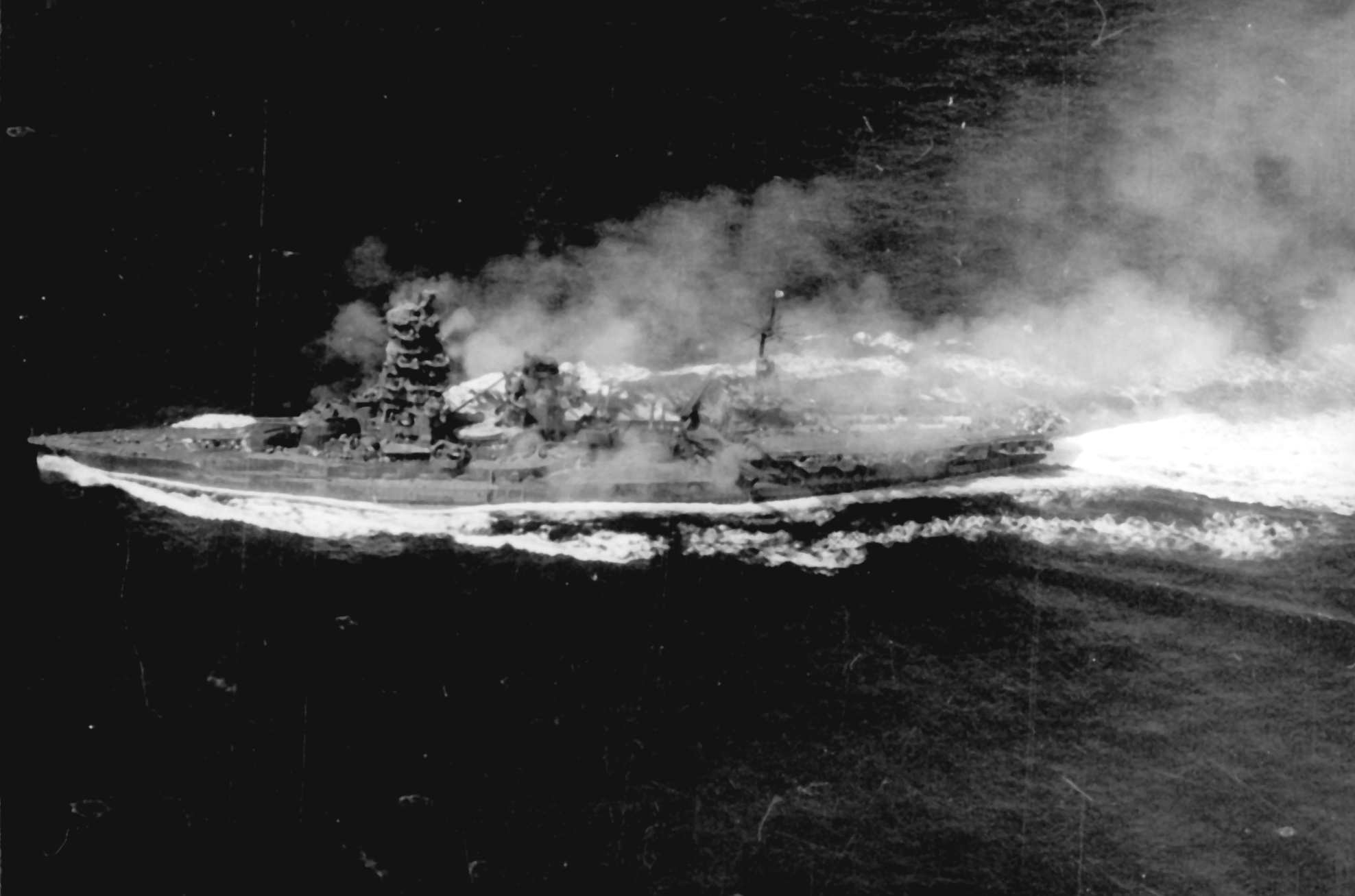
Ise in anti-aircraft combat

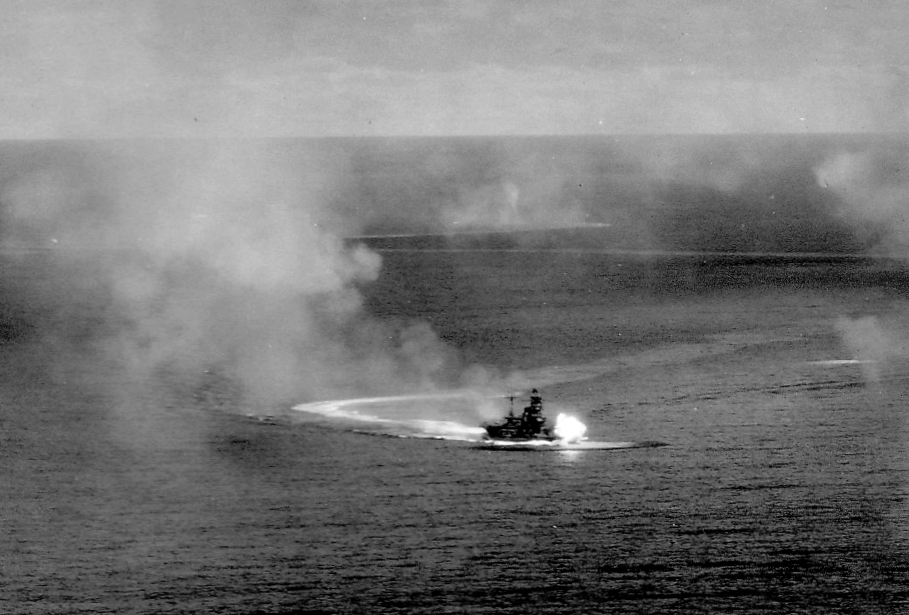
Ise fires her main guns during the Battle off Cape Engaño, a phase of the Battle of Leyte Gulf

After the Americans began attacking Japanese installations in the Bonin Islands on 10 October 1944, the aircraft of the Fourth Carrier Division were ordered to prepare for combat by the commander of the Combined Fleet, Admiral Soemu Toyoda. Two days later, the 634th Naval Air Group was reassigned to the Second Air Fleet and began flying to bases in southern Kyushu, among these were nine D4Ys and a dozen E16As assigned to Ise and Hyūga. On 14 October they attacked the aircraft carriers of Task Force 38 near Formosa with little effect and heavy losses. The following day Nakase was promoted to rear admiral.

The ships of the Fourth Carrier Division were assigned to the Main Body of the 1st Mobile Fleet, commanded by Vice-Admiral Jisaburō Ozawa. The Main Body's role was to act as a decoy to attract attention away from the two other forces approaching from the south and west. All forces were to converge on Leyte Gulf on 25 October and the Main Body left Japan on 20 October. By the morning of 24 October, the Main Body was within range of the northernmost American carriers of Task Force 38 and Ozawa ordered an air strike launched by the Third Carrier Division (Ise and Hyūga had no aircraft aboard) to attract the attention of the Americans. This accomplished little else as the Japanese aircraft failed to penetrate past the defending fighters; the survivors landed at airfields on the Philippine island of Luzon. The Americans were preoccupied dealing with the other Japanese naval forces and defending themselves from air attacks launched from Luzon and Leyte and could not spare any aircraft to search for the Japanese carriers until the afternoon. They finally found them, but Admiral William Halsey, Jr., commander of Task Force 38, decided that it was too late in the day to mount an effective strike. He did, however, turn all his ships north to position himself for a dawn attack on the Japanese carriers the next day.

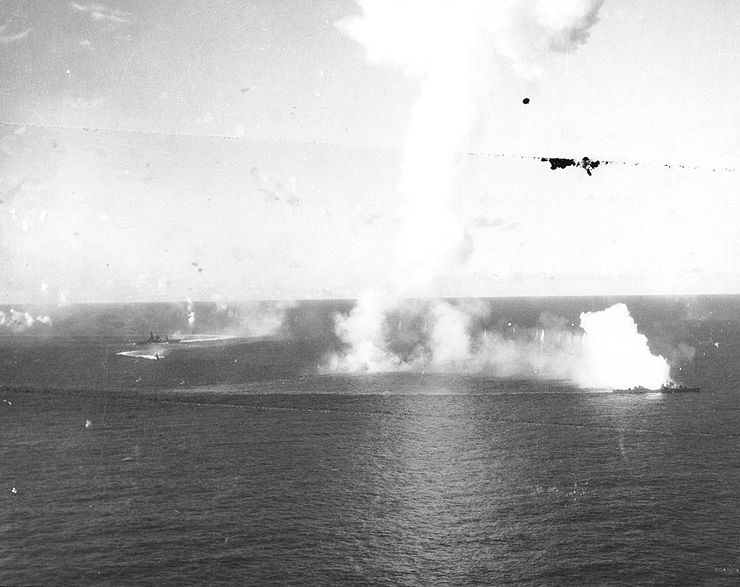
Ise (centre left) during the Battle off Cape Engaño

On the morning of 25 October, Ise was positioned astern of the carriers Zuikaku and Zuihō to protect them with her anti-aircraft guns. Her radar picked up American aircraft at a range of 125 nautical miles (232 km; 144 mi) at 07:39. The first attack began at 08:20, with the old battleship engaging enemy aircraft with San Shiki anti-aircraft shells from her main guns with unknown effect. She was not heavily attacked, but two bombs fell nearby. The second wave of aircraft attacked at 10:05 and the ship's gunners claimed to have shot down five of the ten dive bombers. Ise was near missed eight times, although one small bomb struck No. 2 turret. The third wave was detected by her radar at 12:28, but it did not attack the battleship, sinking the damaged Zuikaku and Zuihō instead. Ise rescued 98 survivors from Zuihō before the next attack began around 17:26. She was the primary focus of this wave and was attacked by about 85 dive bombers and at least 11 torpedo bombers. Saved by heavy anti-aircraft fire and expert manoeuvring, the battleship dodged all the torpedoes, and was struck by only one bomb, near the port catapult. Roughly 34 near misses damaged her hull plating near the waterline and started a small leak that contaminated a small oil tank and caused minor damage to the port boiler rooms. Splinters from the near misses and the single hit killed 5 crewmen and wounded 71.

The American submarine USS Halibut spotted the Fourth Carrier Division at 17:42 and manoeuvred to attack, missing with six torpedoes at 18:43. At 19:00 Ozawa ordered Matsuda to take his ships south to defend the light cruiser Isuzu and her escorting destroyers that were attempting to rescue survivors of the crippled light carrier Chiyoda despite gunfire from a group of four American cruisers. Unable to locate either group of ships, Ozawa ordered Matsuda to reverse course at 23:30 and head for Amami Ōshima to refuel. Despite being spotted by American submarines en route, the division arrived safely on 27 October. After leaving the island the following day, they were unsuccessfully attacked by the submarine USS Sea Dog before their arrival at Kure on the 29th.

Between 29 October and 8 November, the catapults were removed to improve the firing arcs of No. 3 and No. 4 turrets. Ise and Hyūga departed on 11 November, loaded with troops and munitions for Manila, capital of the Philippines, but news was received of heavy American air attacks on Manila and they were diverted to the Spratly Islands. They arrived on 14 November and their cargo was unloaded so it could be transferred to the Philippines. The 4th Carrier Division was transferred to the 2nd Fleet the following day. Reinforced by the battleship Haruna and three cruisers, the sisters proceeded on to Lingga Island, near Singapore, on 20 November. They arrived two days later and remained there until 12 December when they departed for Cam Ranh Bay, French Indochina, where they were on standby for an attack on an American supply convoy bound for the island of Mindanao in the Philippines. The attack was cancelled on the 30th and the ships sailed for Singapore where they arrived on 1 January 1945 before continuing on to Lingga. That same day the Fourth Carrier Division was transferred to the Southwest Area Fleet.

=== Final role ===
On 6 February, the division sailed for Singapore to participate in Operation Kita. While approaching Singapore, Ise was slightly damaged by a mine. Given temporary repairs at the former British naval base there, Ise, Hyūga, and the light cruiser Ōyodo were loaded with critically needed strategic war supplies (oil, rubber, tin, zinc, and mercury) and 1,150 surplus oil workers to be ferried back to Japan.

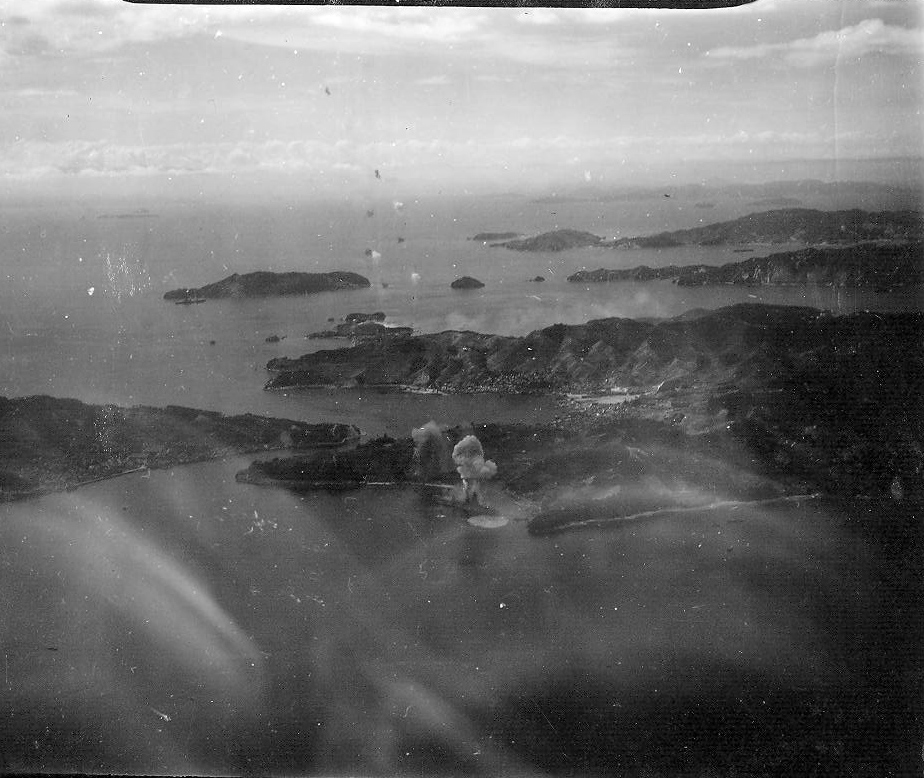
Ise burning during the Kure air raid, 28 July 1945

The division sailed from Singapore on 10 February and was spotted by the British submarine HMS Tantalus the following day. It was forced to submerge by a maritime patrol aircraft and was unable to attack. On 13 February the submarine USS Bergall unsuccessfully attacked the ships as did the submarine USS Blower. One of Ise's AA guns caused one of Blower's torpedoes to detonate prematurely. Later that afternoon, Ōyodo launched one of her floatplanes which spotted the submarine USS Bashaw on the surface about 22 km (14 mi) ahead of the convoy. Hyūga opened fire with her main guns and forced Bashaw to submerge when one of her shells landed within 1.6 km (0.99 mi) of the submarine. The convoy reached the Matsu Islands, off the Chinese coast, on the 15th and was unsuccessfully attacked by the submarine USS Rasher before they reached Zhoushan Island, near Shanghai that night. The convoy reached Kure on 20 February, having evaded or escaped pursuit by 23 Allied submarines along the way. Nakase was relieved by Captain Mutaguchi Kakuro five days later.

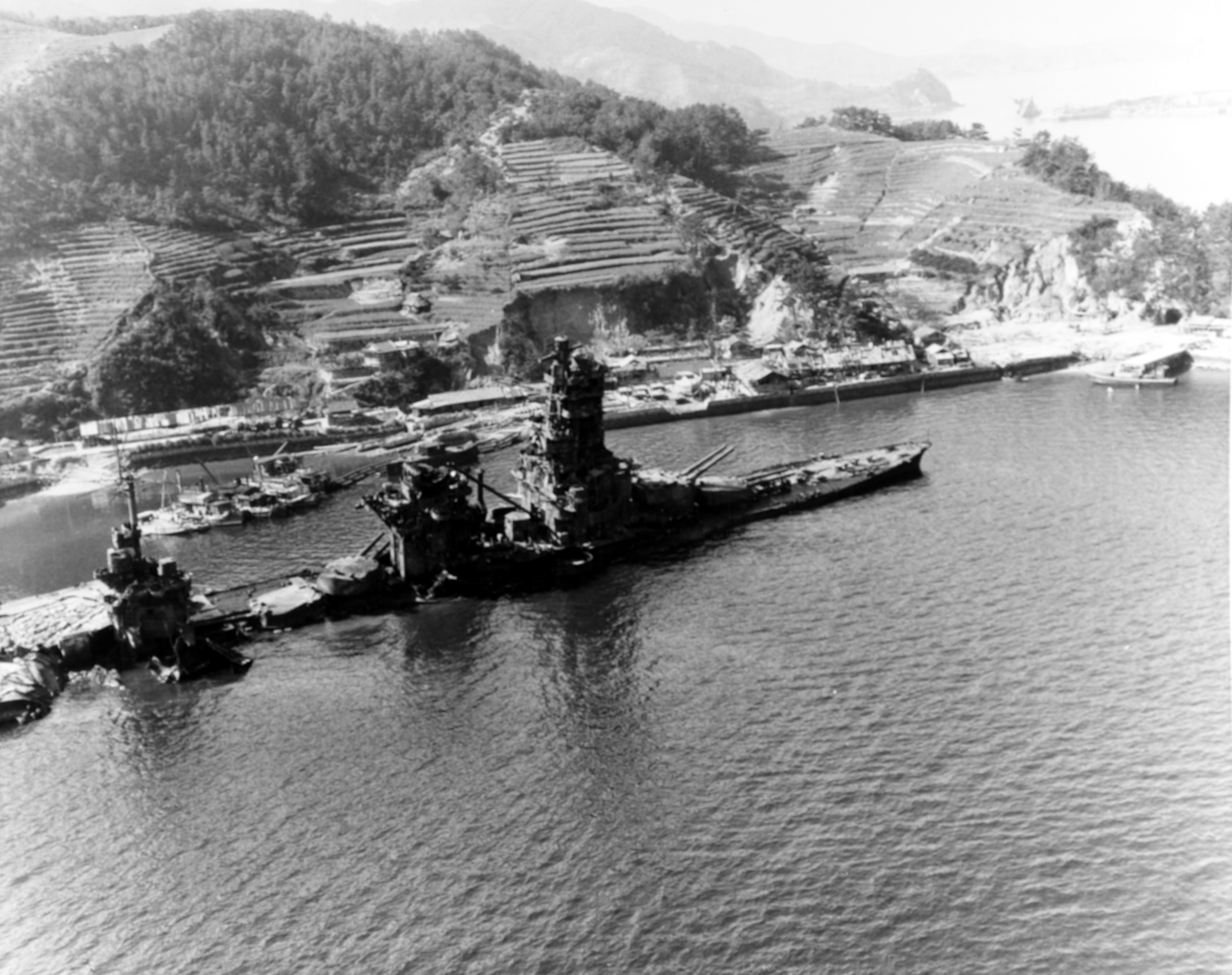
The wreck of Ise, October 1945

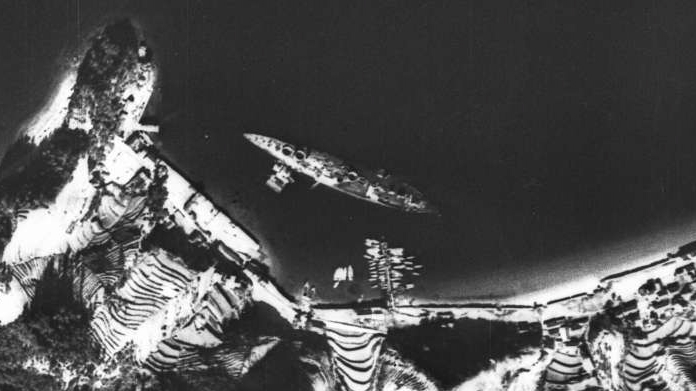
Ise being scrapped, with the main guns already removed

The 4th Carrier Division was disbanded on 1 March and Ise was reduced to first-class reserve. From this time until the surrender of Japan, Ise remained docked at Kure, without fuel or aircraft, and repainted in an olive green camouflage with vari-coloured splotches. The camouflage was not effective against American carrier-based aircraft from Task Force 58 (TF 58) on 19 March, when more than 240 aircraft attacked Kure and Ise was hit by two bombs. Re-designated as a fourth-class reserve ship on 20 April, Ise was towed to the island of Ondo Seto (between Kure and Kurahashijima) to serve as a floating anti-aircraft battery. She was attacked again on 24 July by 60 carrier-based aircraft, whose bombs hit the starboard bow, flight deck, main deck, No. 3 turret and bridge, killing Mutaguchi, other bridge personnel, and around 50 crewmen; many other crewmen were wounded. The ship settled by the bow; it took three days to pump her dry. The IJN planned to drydock her for repairs but she was struck by five 450 kg (1,000 lb) bombs dropped by F4U Corsair fighters from USS Hancock, and eleven more bombs dropped by other aircraft from TF 58 on 28 July. Later that day an attack by 18 USAAF Consolidated B-24 Liberator heavy bombers was unsuccessful. Ise took on a 15° list to starboard and sank in shallow water. Salvage efforts were abandoned that same day, although some AA guns were stripped from her wreck. The ship was struck from the Navy Directory on 20 November. The underwater portion of Ise's wreck was ignored until the following year and she was scrapped in place by the Kure Dockyard of the Harima Zōsen Corporation from 9 October 1946 to 4 July 1947.
