= Aichi E16A Zuiun =

Japanese reconnaissance floatplane

E16A Zuiun
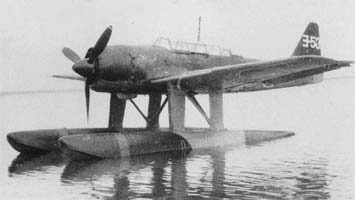
- A E16A1 Yo-53 of the Yokosuka Kōkutai (Naval Air Group), as can be seen by its tail markings.

General information
- Type: Reconnaissance Floatplane
- Manufacturer: Aichi Kokuki; Nippon Hikōki
- Primary user: IJN Air Service
- Number built: 256 units in total 197 units of Aichi, Eitoku Factory; 59 units of Nippon Hikōki

History
- Manufactured: 1944–1945
- Introduction date: February 1944
- First flight: 22 May 1942

The Aichi E16A Zuiun (瑞雲, Auspicious Cloud), (Allied reporting name "Paul") was a twin-seat reconnaissance seaplane designed and produced by the Japanese aviation company Aichi Kokuki KK. It was operated by the Imperial Japanese Navy (IJN) during World War II.

Designed as a replacement for the Aichi E13A, work began on the aircraft as the AM-22 in 1940, to which the Imperial Japanese Navy Air Service (IJNAS) drafted a new specification around in early 1941. It was a conventional low-wing monoplane furnished with floats and dive brakes; although atypical for a seaplane, the dive brakes had been added due to the aircraft's secondary role as a dive bomber. The aircraft was almost entirely made of metal and armed with three 7.7 mm machine guns, one of which was rear-facing and flexibly-mounted. In May 1942, the first prototype was completed. During the refinement of the design, such as to eliminate excessive buffeting, two additional prototypes with a greater wing span were completed.

Quantity production of the E16A was authorised in August 1943. The type was produced by both Aichi and Nippon Hikoki K.K.. Introduced to service by the IJNAS in early 1944, by which point the Allies had seized air superiority, the E16A experienced a high attrition rate throughout its life, especially during the Philippines campaign. It was also used to conduct kamikaze attacks.

== Design and development ==
The Aichi E16A originated from a 1939 specification for a replacement for the Aichi E13A, which, at that time, had yet to be accepted by the Imperial Japanese Navy Air Service (IJNAS). This apparently short timeframe for procuring a successor was the result of both institutional prioritisation and theatre infrastructure conditions: the IJNAS placed significant value on aerial reconnaissance while a lack of runways available across the vast Pacific Ocean compelled a preference for seaplanes. Disagreements about the requirements in the "Number 14" specification prevented most manufacturers from submitting designs, but, in January 1941, a new "Number 16" specification was drafted by the IJNAS around the Aichi AM-22 design, which had already been drawn up by Aichi engineers Kishiro Matsuo and Yasuhiro Ozawa.

In terms of its configuration, the aircraft, which was initially assigned the experimental designation Navy Experimental Number 16 Reconnaissance Seaplane and later the short designation E16A1, was a conventional low-wing monoplane equipped with two floats. The airframe was almost entirely composed of metal, exceptions being the wingtips and tailplane (which were composed of wood) and the control surfaces (which were covered with fabric). Armaments comprised a pair of wing-mounted 7.7 mm machine guns as well as a rear-facing flexibly-mounted 7.7 mm machine gun.

The wings, which could be folded upwards for more compact stowage onboard IJNAS vessels, were attached to the floats via vertical N-shaped struts. These floats, which were composed of metal and featured a single step, were also attached to the fuselage via included I-shaped struts. Furthermore, the front legs of the float struts were hydraulically-actuated dive brakes; while an atypical feature for a seaplane, these brakes were present to augment the aircraft's performance when being used as a dive bomber, which was an expressed secondary role for the type.

In May 1942, the first prototype was completed; it would be promptly followed by two additional prototypes that had a larger wing span. The latter were used to evaluate alternative configurations for the dive brakes after the original arrangement had been identified as the cause of excessive buffeting when deployed. In August 1943, following several modifications, including an improved flap-actuation mechanism, redesigned canopy, perforated dive brakes, and strengthened floats, the aircraft was accepted for production as the Navy Reconnaissance Seaplane Zuiun Model 11.

The majority of E16As were produced by Aichi at their Eitoku plant; additional units were manufactured by Nippon Hikoki K.K. at Tomioka. While initial production aircraft were powered by the Mitsubishi MK8A Kinsei 51 14-cylinder radial engine, however, later-built units were powered by the Mitsubishi MK8D Kinsei 54 powerplant instead.

== Operational history ==
By the time of the E16A's introduction in early 1944, Imperial Japan had already lost air superiority to the Allies. This situation led to heavy losses of the type from the onset of operations, such as during the Philippines campaign. Following this ill-fated campaign, the majority of the remaining E16As were expended on kamikaze attacks in the vicinity of Okinawa.

== Exposed model ==
A full-scale replica of a Zuiun was created by C2 Praparat for various events related to the Kantai Collection franchise. This model was permanently installed in 2026 in the park of the Yamato Museum.

== Variants ==
E16A1 Experimental Type 16 reconnaissance seaplane (16試水上偵察機, 16-Shi Suijō Teisatsuki)
Initial named Experimental Type 14 two-seat reconnaissance seaplane (14試2座水上偵察機, 14-Shi 2-Za Suijō Teisatsuki). Three prototypes produced. Mounted 1,300 hp (970 kW) Mitsubishi MK8A Kinsei 51 engine, 2 × forward-firing 7.7 mm (.303in) Type 97 machine guns, 1 × rearward-firing 7.7 mm Type 92 machine gun.
E16A1 Zuiun Model 11 (瑞雲11型, Zuiun 11-gata)
General production model. Mounted 1,300 hp (970 kW) Mitsubishi MK8N Kinsei 54 engine, 2 × forward-firing 20 mm Type 99-2 cannons, 1 × rearward-firing 13 mm Type 2 machine gun.
E16A2 Provisional name Zuiun Model 12 (仮称瑞雲12型, Kashō Zuiun 12-gata)
Initial named Zuiun Model 22. Single prototype with a 1,560 hp (1,160 kW) Mitsubishi MK8P Kinsei 62 radial engine. One plane converted from E16A1, incomplete.

== Operators ==
Japan

- Imperial Japanese Navy Air Service
- Naval vessel
  - Battleship Ise, supplied from 634th Kōkūtai
  - Battleship Hyūga, supplied from 634th Kōkūtai
- Air unit
  - Kitaura Kōkutai
  - Takuma Kōkutai
  - Yokosuka Kōkutai
  - 631st Kōkutai
  - 634th Kōkutai
  - 801st Kōkutai
  - 301st Reconnaissance Hikōtai
    - A part of Yokosuka Kōkutai, 10 July 1944 - 9 October 1944
    - A part of 801st Kōkutai, 10 October 1944 - 14 November 1944
    - A part of 634th Kōkutai, 15 November 1944 - postwar
  - 302nd Reconnaissance Hikōtai
    - A part of 801st Kōkutai, 15 December 1944 - 24 April 1945
    - A part of Takuma Kōkutai, 25 April 1945 - 30 June 1945
    - A part of 634th Kōkutai, 1 July 1945 - postwar

== Specifications (E16A1 Zuiun Model 11) ==
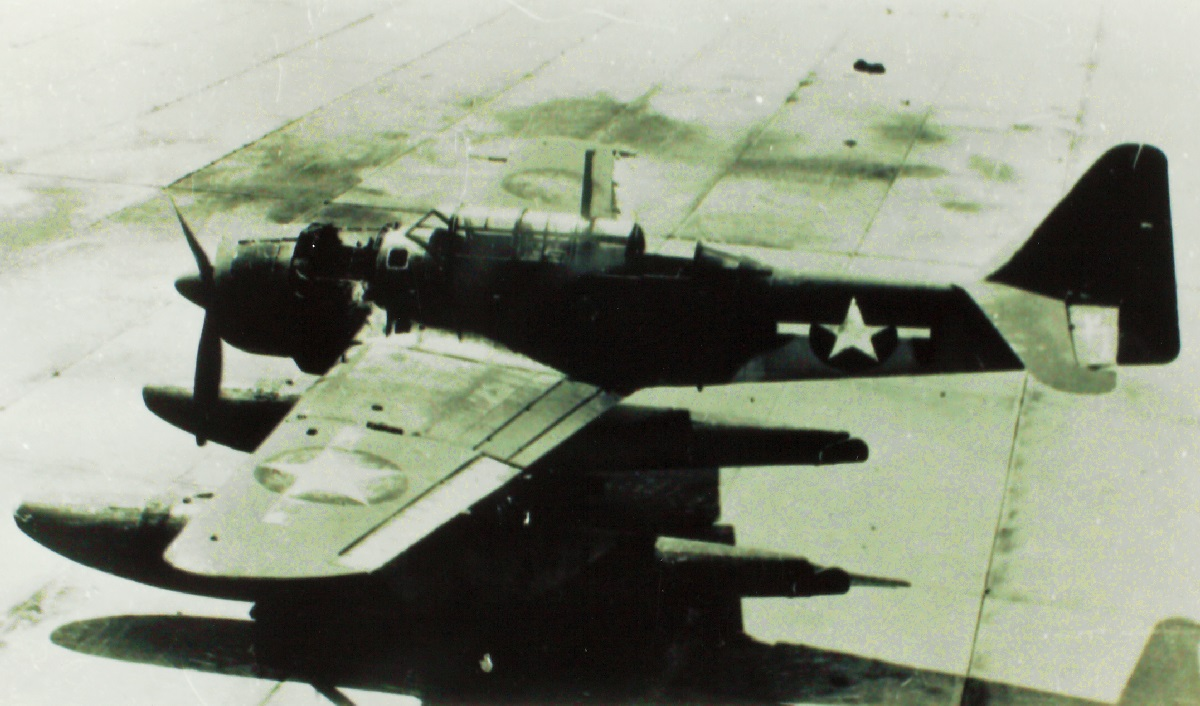
E16A following U.S. capture

Data from Japanese Aircraft of the Pacific War

General characteristics

- Crew: 2
- Length: 10.833 m (35 ft 6 in)
- Wingspan: 12.81 m (42 ft 0 in)
- Height: 4.791 m (15 ft 9 in)
- Wing area: 28 m^{2} (300 sq ft)
- Empty weight: 2,945 kg (6,493 lb)
- Gross weight: 3,900 kg (8,598 lb)
- Max takeoff weight: 4,553 kg (10,038 lb)
- Powerplant: 1 × Mitsubishi MK8D Kinsei 54 14-cylinder air-cooled radial piston engine, 970 kW (1,300 hp) for take-off

895 kW (1,200 hp) at 3,000 m (9,800 ft)
820 kW (1,100 hp) at 6,200 m (20,300 ft)

- Propellers: 3-bladed constant-speed propeller

Performance

- Maximum speed: 439 km/h (273 mph, 237 kn) at 5,500 m (18,000 ft)
- Cruise speed: 333 km/h (207 mph, 180 kn) at 5,000 m (16,000 ft)
- Range: 1,176 km (731 mi, 635 nmi)
- Ferry range: 2,420 km (1,500 mi, 1,310 nmi)
- Service ceiling: 10,000 m (33,000 ft)
- Rate of climb: 10 m/s (2,000 ft/min)
- Time to altitude: 3,000 m (9,800 ft) in four minutes and 40 seconds
- Wing loading: 139.3 kg/m^{2} (28.5 lb/sq ft)
- Power/mass: 0.25 kW/kg (0.15 hp/lb)

Armament

- Guns:
  - 2 fixed forward-firing 20 mm (0.787 in) Type 99 Mark 2 machine guns in the wings
  - 1 flexible rearward-firing 13 mm (0.512 in) Type 2 machine gun for the observer
- Bombs:
  - 250 kg (551 lb) of bombs

== See also ==
Aircraft of comparable role, configuration, and era

- Aichi E13A
- Arado Ar 196
- Curtiss SC Seahawk
- Vought OS2U Kingfisher

Related lists

- List of aircraft of Japan during World War II
- List of aircraft of the Japanese Navy
- List of aircraft of World War II
- List of military aircraft of Japan
- List of flying boats and floatplanes
