= Vickers 14-inch/45 naval gun =

Vickers 14-inch 45-calibre naval gun 14"41st Year Type 14" 43rd Year Type 36 cm 41st Year Type
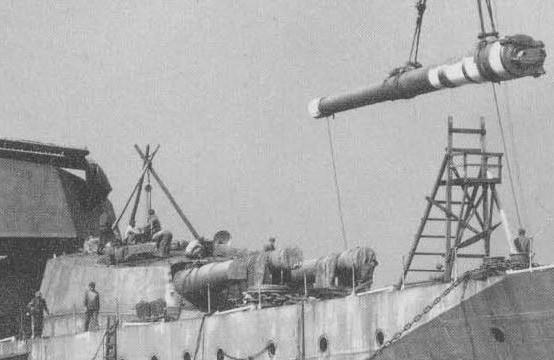
- Gun being installed on Haruna, Kobe, October 1914
- Type: Naval gun

Service history
- In service: 1913–1945
- Used by: Imperial Japanese Navy
- Wars: World War I, World War II

Production history
- Designer: Vickers
- Designed: 1910
- Manufacturer: Vickers; Kure Arsenal; Japan Steel Works
- No. built: 100

Specifications
- Mass: 86,000 kilograms (86 t)
- Length: 54 ft 0.4 in (16.469 m)
- Barrel length: 52 ft 6 in (16.002 m) (45 calibres)
- Shell: 673.5 kg (1,485 lb)
- Calibre: 14-inch (355.6 mm)
- Elevation: -3° to +43°
- Rate of fire: 2 rpm
- Muzzle velocity: 775 m/s (2,540 ft/s)
- Maximum firing range: 35,450 m (38,770 yd)

The Vickers 14-inch 45-calibre gun was designed and built by Vickers and initially installed on the battlecruiser Kongō which it was building for the Imperial Japanese Navy. Guns similar to this Vickers design were also later built in Japan to arm Kongō's sister ships and subsequent Japanese-constructed "super-dreadnoughts" which were all built in Japan. Japanese-built versions of the guns were designated 14-inch 41st Year Type, and from 1917 when the Navy went metric they were redesignated 36 cm 41st Year Type.

== History ==
The original design for the Kongō class featured 12-inch (304.8 mm) 50-caliber guns. Cdr Katô Hirohasu of the Imperial Japanese Navy pushed for the adoption of the new 14-inch gun that was currently under development. After trials of the new gun, which were witnessed by both the Japanese Navy and Royal Navy, the Japanese made the decision on 29 Nov 1911 to use the new gun in Kongō despite her keel having already been laid down on 17 January 1911, and the resulting need to quickly make a large number of alterations to the design, so as to not prolong the construction.

This gun armed the following Japanese warships:

- Kongō-class battlecruisers, launched 1912–1913:
  - Kongō
  - Hiei
  - Kirishima
  - Haruna
- Fusō-class battleships, launched 1915:
  - Fusō
  - Yamashiro
- Ise-class battleships, launched 1916–1917:
  - Ise
  - Hyūga

== See also ==
- List of naval guns

=== Weapons of comparable role, performance and era ===
- 14-inch/45-caliber gun US equivalent
- 340mm/45 Modèle 1912 gun French equivalent
- EOC 14-inch 45-calibre naval gun Elswick Ordnance (Britain) equivalent
- BL 14-inch Mk VII naval gun more modern British equivalent

== Bibliography ==
- Campbell, John (1985). Naval Weapons of World War Two. Annapolis, Maryland: Naval Institute Press. ISBN 0-87021-459-4.
- Tony DiGiulian, Japan 14"/45 (35.6 cm) Vickers Mark "A" - 14"/45 (35.6 cm) 43rd Year Type - 14"/45 (35.6 cm) 41st Year Type - 36 cm/45 (14") 41st Year Type
