= Japanese battleship Hyūga =

Ise-class battleship

Coordinates: 34°10′0″N 132°32′59″E

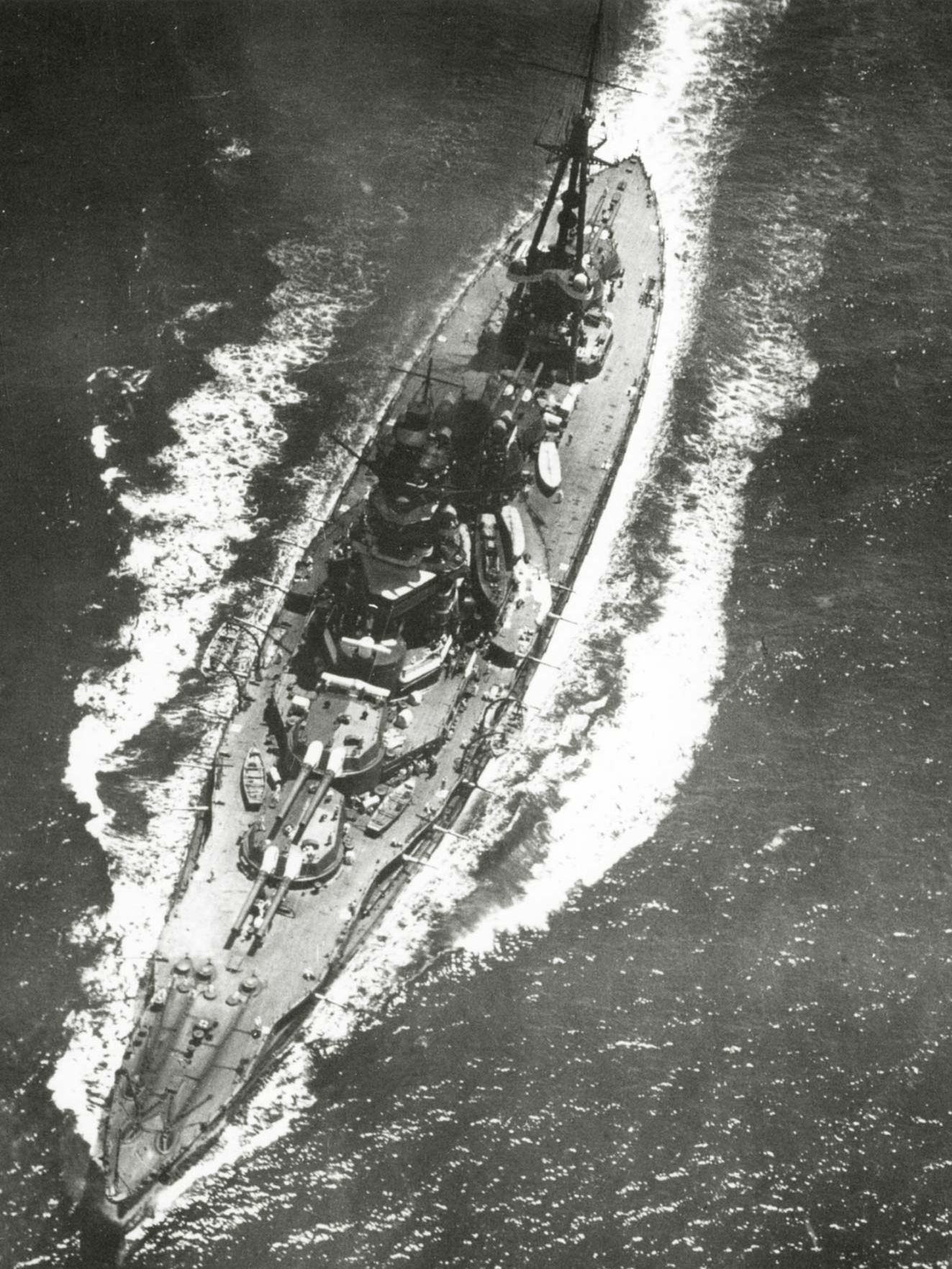
- Aerial view of Hyūga in 1927

History

Empire of Japan
- Name: Hyūga
- Namesake: Hyūga Province
- Builder: Mitsubishi Heavy Industries
- Laid down: 6 May 1915
- Launched: 27 January 1917
- Commissioned: 30 April 1918
- Stricken: 20 November 1945
- Fate: Sunk, 27 July 1945 and subsequently scrapped, 1946–1947

General characteristics (as built)
- Class & type: Ise-class battleship
- Displacement: 29,980 long tons (30,460 t) (standard); 36,500 long tons (37,100 t) (full load)
- Length: 208.18 m (683 ft) (o.a.)
- Beam: 28.65 m (94 ft)
- Draught: 8.93 m (29 ft 4 in)
- Installed power: 24 × water-tube boilers; 45,000 shp (34,000 kW)
- Propulsion: 4 × shafts; 2 × steam turbine sets
- Speed: 23 knots (43 km/h; 26 mph)
- Range: 9,680 nmi (17,930 km; 11,140 mi) at 14 knots (26 km/h; 16 mph)
- Complement: 1,360
- Armament: 6 × twin 35.6 cm (14 in) guns; 20 × single 14 cm (5.5 in) guns; 4 × single 7.62 cm (3 in) AA guns; 6 × 53.3 cm (21 in) torpedo tubes
- Armour: Belt: 299 mm (11.8 in); Decks: 85 mm (3.3 in); Turrets: 254 mm (10 in)

General characteristics (after first reconstruction)
- Displacement: 42,001 long tons (42,675 t) (full load)
- Length: 215.8 m (708 ft)
- Beam: 31.75 m (104 ft 2 in)
- Draught: 9.45 m (31 ft)
- Installed power: 8 × water-tube boilers; 80,000 shp (60,000 kW)
- Propulsion: 4 × steam turbine sets
- Speed: 24.5 knots (45.4 km/h; 28.2 mph)
- Range: 7,870 nmi (14,580 km; 9,060 mi) at 16 knots (30 km/h; 18 mph)
- Complement: 1,376
- Armament: 6 × twin 35.6 cm (14 in) guns; 16 × single 14 cm (5.5 in) guns; 4 × twin 12.7 cm (5 in) DP guns; 10 × twin 2.5 cm (1 in) AA guns
- Armour: Decks: 152 mm (6 in)
- Aircraft carried: 3
- Aviation facilities: 1 catapult

General characteristics (as hybrid carrier, 1945)
- Displacement: 39,805 long tons (40,444 t) (full load)
- Length: 219.62 m (720 ft 6 in)
- Beam: 31.71 m (104 ft)
- Draught: 9.03 m (29 ft 8 in)
- Range: 9,500 nmi (17,600 km; 10,900 mi) at 16 knots
- Complement: 1,463
- Sensors & processing systems: 1 × Type 21 air-search radar; 2 × Type 13 early warning radars; 2 × Type 22 surface-search radars
- Armament: 4 × twin 35.6 cm guns; 8 × twin 12.7 cm DP guns; 31 × triple, 11 × single 2.5 cm AA guns; 6 × 30-round 12.7 cm AA rocket launchers
- Aircraft carried: 22
- Aviation facilities: 2 catapults

Hyūga (Japanese: 日向; named after the ancient Hyūga Province) was the second and last Ise-class battleship built for the Imperial Japanese Navy (IJN) during the 1910s. Although completed in 1918, she played no role in World War I. Hyūga supported Japanese forces in the early 1920s during the Siberian intervention in the Russian Civil War. In 1923, she assisted survivors of the Great Kantō earthquake. The ship was partially modernised in two stages in 1927–1928 and 1931–1932, during which her forward superstructure was rebuilt in the pagoda mast style. Hyūga was reconstructed in 1934–1936, improvements being made to her armour and propulsion machinery. Afterwards, she played a minor role in the Second Sino-Japanese War.

Despite the expensive reconstruction, the ship was considered obsolete by the eve of the Pacific War, and did not see significant action in the early years of the war. After the loss of most of the IJN's large aircraft carriers during the Battle of Midway in mid-1942, she was rebuilt with a flight deck replacing the rear pair of gun turrets to give her the ability to operate an air group of floatplanes; lack of aircraft and qualified pilots meant that Hyūga never operated her aircraft in combat. She participated in the Battle off Cape Engaño in late 1944, where she helped to decoy the American carrier fleet supporting the invasion of Leyte away from the landing beaches. Afterwards, the ship was transferred to Southeast Asia, occasionally serving as a flagship. In early 1945, Hyūga participated in Operation Kita, during which she transported petrol and other strategic materials back to Japan. The ship was then reduced to reserve until she was sunk during American airstrikes in July. After the war, Hyūga was scrapped in 1946–1947.

== Design and description ==
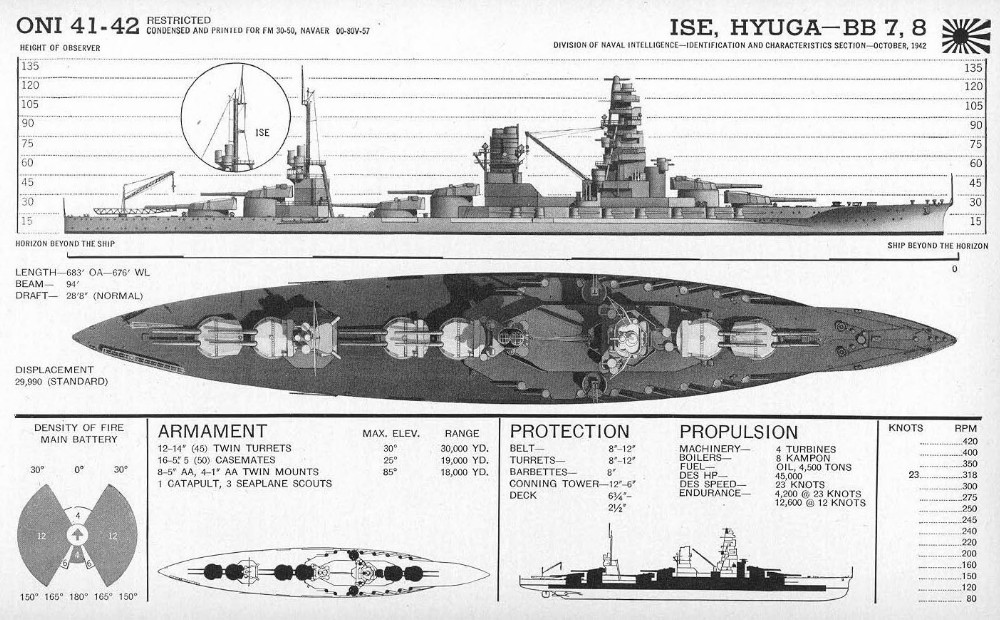
American ship-recognition drawing of the Ise-class battleships before their conversion

The Ise class was designed as an improved version of the preceding Fusō class. The ships had a length of 208.18 metres (683 ft) overall, a beam of 28.65 metres (94 ft) and a draught of 8.93 metres (29 ft 4 in) at deep load. They displaced 29,980 long tons (30,460 t) at standard load and 36,500 long tons (37,100 t) at deep load, roughly 650 long tons (660 t) more than the earlier ships. Their crew consisted of 1,360 officers and ratings.

During the ships' modernisation in the 1930s, their forward superstructure was enlarged with multiple platforms added to their tripod masts to create a pagoda mast. Both ships were also given torpedo bulges to improve their underwater protection and to compensate for the weight of the extra armour. These changes increased their overall length to 215.8 metres (708 ft), their beam to 31.75 metres (104 ft 2 in) and their draught to 9.45 metres (31 ft). Their displacement increased over 5,000 long tons (5,100 t) to 42,001 long tons (42,675 t) at deep load. The crew now numbered 1,376 officers and enlisted men.

=== Propulsion ===
The Ise-class ships had two sets of direct-drive steam turbines, each of which drove two propeller shafts, using steam provided by 24 Kampon Ro Gō water-tube boilers. The turbines were designed to produce a total of 45,000 shaft horsepower (34,000 kW) and give the ships a speed of 23 knots (43 km/h; 26 mph). Hyūga reached 24 knots (44 km/h; 28 mph) from 63,211 shp (47,136 kW) during her sea trials. Each of the boilers consumed a mixture of coal and oil, and the ships carried enough of both to give them a range of 9,680 nautical miles (17,930 km; 11,140 mi) at a speed of 14 knots (26 km/h; 16 mph).

During their 1930s modernisation, the boilers on each ship were replaced by eight new Kampon oil-fired boilers. The turbines were replaced by four geared Kampon turbines with a designed output of 80,000 shp (60,000 kW) intended to increase their speed to 24.5 knots (45.4 km/h; 28.2 mph). The fuel storage of the ships was increased which gave them a range of 7,870 nautical miles (14,580 km; 9,060 mi) at 16 knots (30 km/h; 18 mph), despite the additional weight.

=== Armament ===
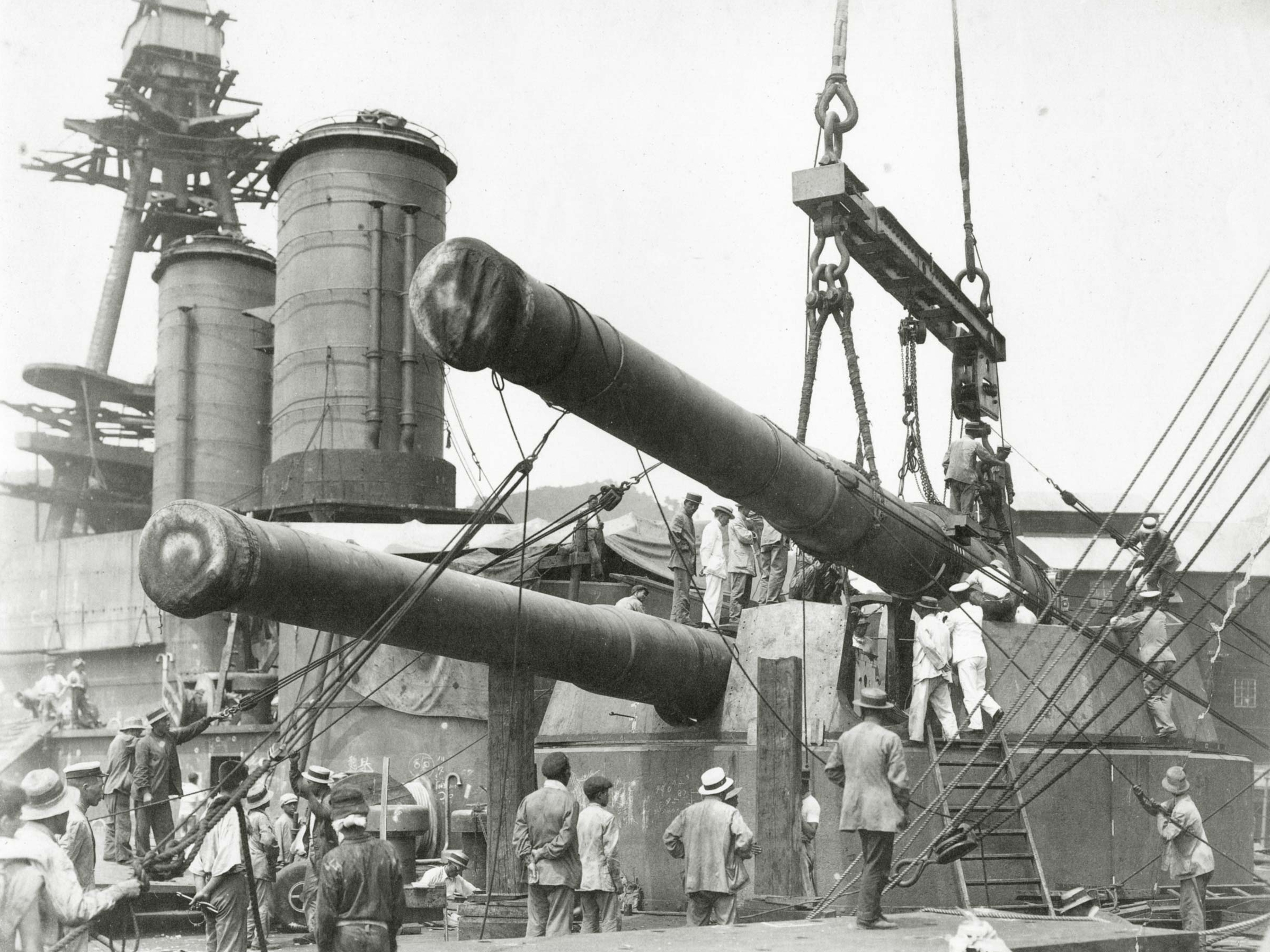
Installation of a 35.6-centimetre gun in Hyūga's No. 4 gun turret

The twelve 35.6-centimetre (14 in) Type 41 guns of the Ise class were mounted in three pairs of twin-gun, superfiring turrets that were numbered one through six from front to rear. The first pair was forward of the main superstructure, the second pair was amidships, and the last ones were aft of the rear superstructure. The ships' secondary armament consisted of twenty 14-centimetre (5.5 in) Type 3 guns in single mounts. Eighteen of these were mounted in casemates in the forecastle and superstructure and the remaining pair were mounted on the deck above them and protected by gun shields. (Note: Jentschura, Jung & Mickel also credit the ships with a dozen 8 cm 3rd Year Type guns, but these were actually shorter and lighter 8 cm Type 41 saluting guns that could be used by the ships' boats and landing parties ashore.) Anti-aircraft defence was provided by four 40-calibre 3rd Year Type 8-centimetre (3 in) (Note: These guns were license-built British quick-firing (QF) QF 12-pounder guns. While the Japanese designated them as 8 cm, their actual calibre was 76.2 mm.) anti-aircraft (AA) guns in single mounts. The ships were also fitted with six submerged 53.3-centimetre (21.0 in) torpedo tubes, three on each broadside.

In 1931–1933 the AA guns were replaced with eight 12.7-centimetre (5 in) Type 89 dual-purpose guns, placed beside the forward superstructure in four twin-gun mounts. Two twin-gun mounts for license-built Vickers two-pounder (4-centimetre (1.6 in)) light AA guns were also added while the pair of 14 cm guns on the upper deck were removed.

During the mid-1930s reconstruction, the torpedo tubes were removed, and the Vickers two-pounders were replaced by twenty license-built Hotchkiss 2.5-centimetre (1 in) Type 96 light AA guns in 10 twin-gun mounts. This was the standard Japanese light AA gun during World War II, but it suffered from severe design shortcomings that rendered it a largely ineffective weapon. According to naval historian Mark Stille, the twin and triple mounts "lacked sufficient speed in train or elevation; the gun sights were unable to handle fast targets; the gun exhibited excessive vibration; the magazine was too small, and, finally, the gun produced excessive muzzle blast". During the reconstruction, the forward pair of 14-centimetre guns in the forecastle were removed.

=== Protection ===
The Ise-class ships' waterline protective belt had a maximum thickness of 299 mm (11.8 in) of Vickers cemented armour amidships; below it was a strake of 100 mm (3.9 in) armour. The upper armoured deck consisted of two layers of high-tensile steel totalling 55 mm (2.2 in) thick and the lower armoured deck also consisted of two layers of high-tensile steel, but only 30 mm (1.2 in) thick in total. The turrets were protected with an armour thickness of 254 mm (10 in) on the face and 76 mm on the roof. The casemate armour was 149 mm (5.9 in) thick and that of the barbettes was 299 mm thick rather than the originally planned 305 mm. (Note: Sources contradict each other regarding the armour scheme of these ships. Lengerer, the most recent researcher using Japanese sources, has been followed rather than older sources.)

== Construction and career ==
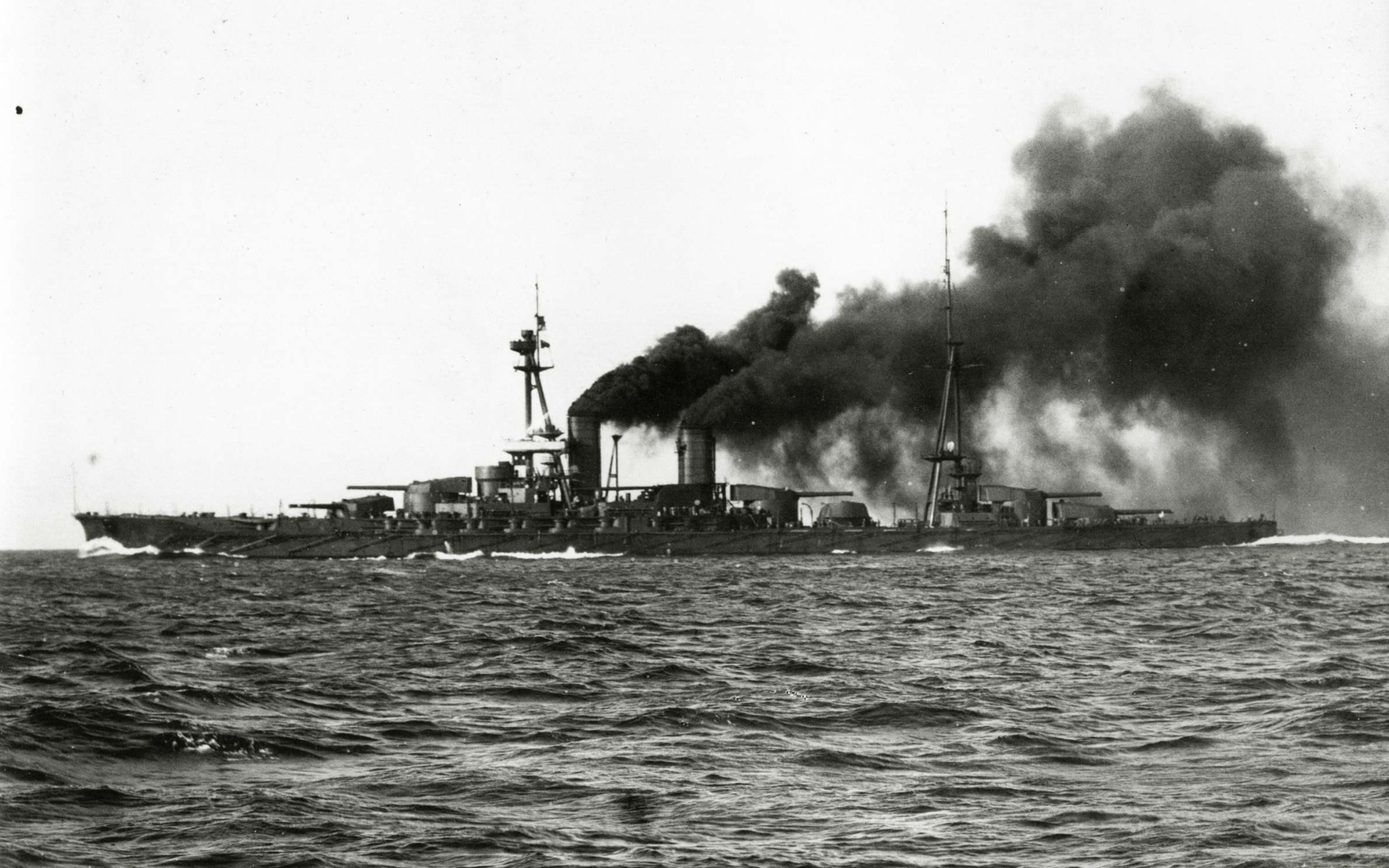
Hyūga shortly after completion

Hyūga, named after Hyūga Province, one of the traditional provinces of Japan, was laid down at the Mitsubishi Heavy Industries shipyard in Nagasaki on 6 May 1915 and launched on 27 January 1917. Captain Shigeushi Nakagawa assumed command on 30 April and the ship was completed on that same day, too late for service in World War I. Hyūga was then assigned to the 1st Battleship Division of the 1st Fleet. Captain Kinzaburo Mimura relieved Nakegawa on 10 November. An explosion in No. 3 gun turret killed 11 crewmen and wounded another 25 during a gunnery exercise on 24 October 1919. Mimura was relieved in his turn by Captain Genjiro Katsuki on 20 November. Hyūga accidentally collided with and sank the schooner Hiromiya Maru, killing two of the sailing ship's crew, on 21 July 1920. On 29 August, the ship began the first of numerous patrols off the Siberian coast and in northern waters in support of Japan's Siberian Intervention against the Bolshevik Red Army. Captain Hidesaburo Ishikawa replaced Katsuki on 20 November and he was replaced by Captain Genji Ide on 20 November 1921.

The ship aided survivors of the 1923 Great Kantō earthquake in September 1923. From the early 1920s through the late 1930s, Hyūga often cruised off the coast of China. Little detailed information is available about her activities during the 1920s. The ship was overhauled in 1927–1928, during which her forward superstructure was enlarged and her aviation facilities improved. Beginning on 27 March 1932, she patrolled off the coast of China after the First Shanghai Incident, together with her sister ship Ise and the battlecruisers Kongo and Kirishima. On 14 June 1932, she was taking part in an exercise off Kyushu near the Mishima Islands in which a group of submarines practiced a mock combined attack on the 1st Battleship Division when the submarine I-4 unexpectedly surfaced in front of her. Hyūga, zigzagging at 12 knots (22 km/h; 14 mph), took evasive action at the last minute and managed to avoid a direct collision with the stationary I-4, although Hyūga suffered minor damage to her hull plating when her bow grazed I-4′s hull.

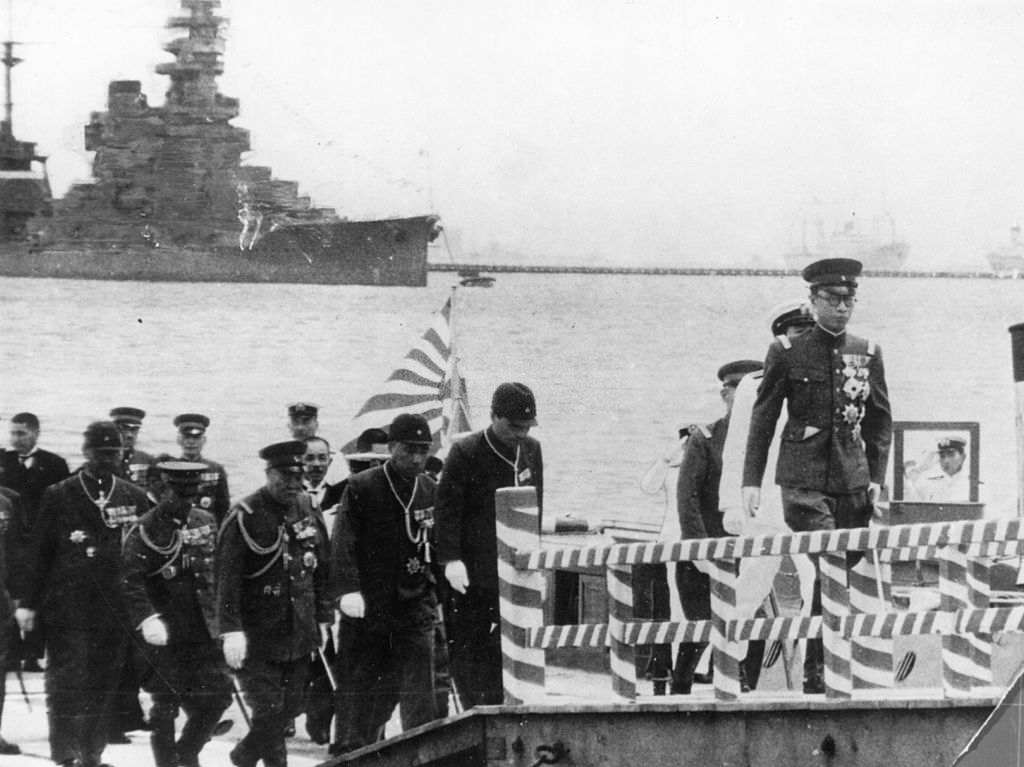
Emperor Pu Yi (Kangde) of Manchukuo during a state visit to Japan, Hyūga is visible in the background

Beginning on 24 October 1934, Hyūga was drydocked at Kure Naval Arsenal and underwent an extensive reconstruction and modernisation that lasted until 7 September 1936. During the Second Sino-Japanese War, the ship ferried two battalions of the 3rd Sasebo Special Naval Landing Force to Port Arthur, China, on 19 August 1937. She began the first of her patrols off the southern Chinese coast on 15 September that lasted until early 1941. On 30 June 1940 Hyūga served as the flagship for the Emperor of Manchukuo, Henry Pu Yi, during his state visit to Japan. Together with Ise, the ship was transferred to the 2nd Battleship Division of the 1st Fleet on 15 November. Captain Noboru Ishizaki assumed command on 1 September 1941.

=== Start of the Pacific War ===
When full-scale war started for Japan on 8 December, (Note: Japan Standard Time is 19 hours ahead of Hawaiian Standard Time, so in Japan, the attack on Pearl Harbor happened on 8 December.) the division, reinforced by the battleships Nagato and Mutsu and the light carrier Hōshō, sortied from Hashirajima to the Bonin Islands as distant support for the 1st Air Fleet attacking Pearl Harbor, and returned six days later. Captain Chiaki Matsuda relieved Ishizaki on 20 February 1942. Together with the rest of the 2nd Battleship Division, Hyūga pursued but did not catch the American carrier force that had launched the Doolittle Raid on 18 April.

In May 1942 while conducting gunnery practice along with Nagato and Mutsu, the breech of Hyūga's left-hand gun in her No. 5 turret exploded, killing 51 crewmen. The two aft magazines were rapidly flooded to save the ship and she returned to Kure for repairs. The turret was deemed not to be repairable and was removed. A circular plate of armour was welded over the barbette and three triple mounts for 2.5 cm AA guns were installed there. While under repair, the ship was fitted with one of the first experimental Type 22 surface-search radar sets in the IJN, but it was removed shortly afterwards.

Hyūga and the rest of the 2nd Battleship Division set sail on 28 May with the Aleutian Support Group at the same time most of the Imperial Fleet began an attack on Midway Island (Operation MI). Commanded by Vice-Admiral Shirō Takasu, the division was composed of Japan's four oldest battleships, including Hyūga, accompanied by two light cruisers, 12 destroyers, and two oilers. Official records do not show the division as part of the larger Midway operation, known as Operation AL; they were to accompany the fleet under Admiral Isoroku Yamamoto, but were only to provide support to the Aleutian task force if needed.

=== Conversion to a hybrid carrier ===
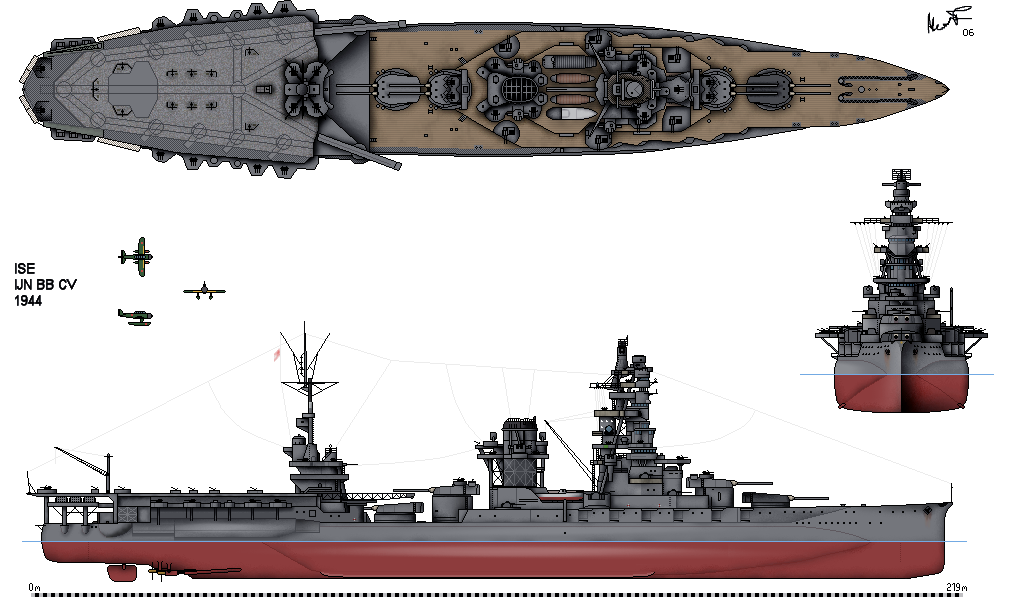
Ise after her 1944 reconstruction

The loss of four Japanese aircraft carriers during the Battle of Midway in June severely limited the ability of the IJN to conduct operations and alternatives were sought. Plans for full conversions of battleships into aircraft carriers were rejected on the grounds of expense and, most critically, time, so the IJN settled on removing the rear pair of turrets from the Ise-class ships and replacing them with a flight deck equipped with two rotating catapults. Matsuda was relieved by Captain Sueo Obayashi on 10 December and he was relieved in turn on 1 May 1943, the same day that the conversion officially began. Work actually began two months later. The ship's No. 6 turret and the barbettes for No. 5 and 6 turrets were replaced by a hangar surmounted by a flight deck. This was not long enough to permit the launch of aircraft or their recovery. Two catapults were installed and the existing crane was moved to the flight deck. This was fitted with an extensive system of rails to link each catapult, the storage positions on the deck and the T-shaped aircraft lift that moved aircraft between the flight deck and the hangar. It had a capacity of nine aircraft, with eleven more stowed on deck, and one on each catapult for a total of twenty-two. The ship's air group was intended to consist of a dozen each Yokosuka D4Y Suisei dive bombers (Allied reporting name "Judy"), modified for catapult launching, and Aichi E16A reconnaissance floatplanes (Allied reporting name "Paul"), of which two to three of each were reserves. The former had to land either on a conventional carrier or on land bases, whereas the E16A could be hoisted back aboard using a crane, after landing on the water near the ship.

During the conversion, all of the 14 cm guns were removed and the ship's anti-aircraft suite was heavily reinforced. The eight 12.7 cm Type 89 guns were supplemented with four twin mounts and the existing 2.5 cm Type 96 AA twin-gun mounts were replaced by 19 triple-gun mounts for a total of 57 weapons.

These changes increased the ship's overall length to 219.62 metres (720 ft 6 in) and the removal of the heavy gun turrets and their barbettes reduced her displacement to 39,805 long tons (40,444 t) at deep load, despite the addition of more fuel oil storage. The extra fuel increased Hyūga's range to 9,500 nautical miles (17,600 km; 10,900 mi). The weight reductions decreased her draught to 9.03 metres (29 ft 8 in). The crew now numbered 1,463 officers and enlisted men.

The rebuild was officially completed on 18 November and Captain Tomekichi Nomura assumed command on 5 December as the ship was working up. Hyūga served as a training ship for most of the first half of 1944. On 25 February, Battleship Division 2 was assigned to the direct control of the Combined Fleet. The sisters were then transferred to the Third Fleet and assigned to the newly reformed Fourth Carrier Division on 1 May. That same day the 634th Naval Air Group was formed and assigned to the Fourth Carrier Division. On 24 May, the ship's light anti-aircraft armament was reinforced with 24 additional Type 96 AA guns in eight triple mounts, which brought her total to 104 guns. On 7 June, a pair of improved Type 22 surface-search radars were installed. A pair of Type 13 early-warning radars and an E27 radar detector were probably also fitted.

On 23 June, the sisters conducted their first catapult training, each with four D4Ys and six E16As aboard; subsequent sessions were conducted on 21 July and 31 August. Two days later, Hyūga became the flagship of the Fourth Carrier Division, now commanded by the recently promoted Rear Admiral Matsuda. In September, six racks of 30-tube 12.7 cm anti-aircraft rocket launchers were added. Training of the D4Y and E16A aircrew was slowed by technical problems and was generally conducted from land bases. By 1 October the 634th had on strength 17 D4Ys, of which six were serviceable, and 18 E16As, of which 16 were operable.

=== Battle off Cape Engaño and afterwards ===
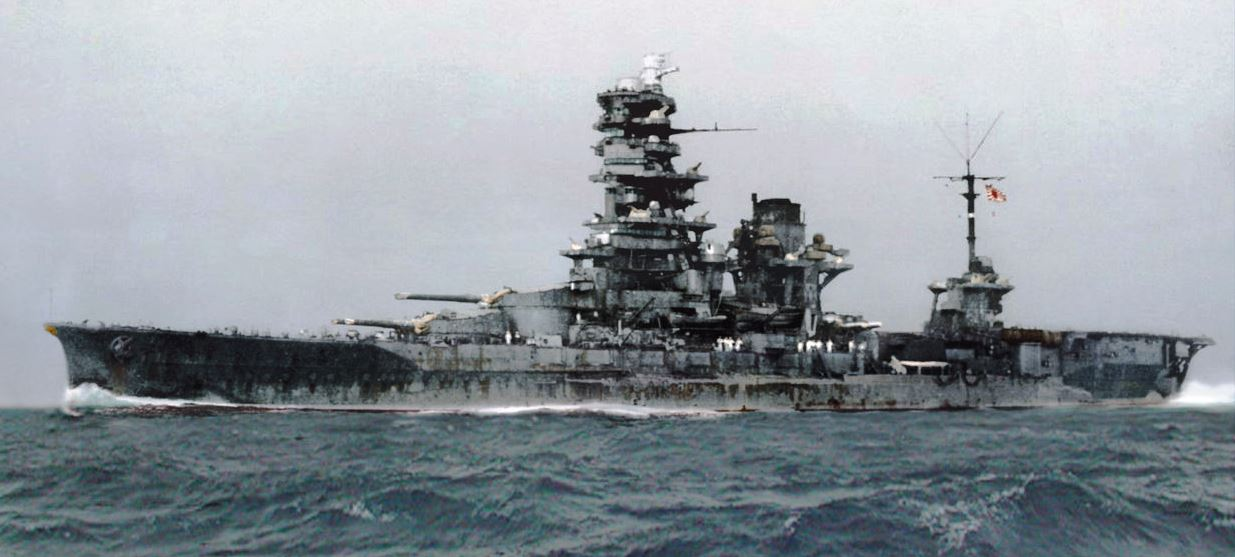
Hyūga on her sea trials in November 1943 after her conversion

After the Americans began attacking Japanese installations in the Bonin Islands on 10 October 1944, the aircraft of the Fourth Carrier Division were ordered to prepare for combat by the commander of the Combined Fleet, Admiral Soemu Toyoda. Two days later, the 634th Naval Air Group was reassigned to the Second Air Fleet and began flying to bases in southern Kyushu; among these were nine D4Ys and a dozen E16As assigned to Ise and Hyūga. On 14 October they attacked the aircraft carriers of Task Force 38 near Formosa with little effect and heavy losses. The following day Nomura was promoted to rear admiral.

The ships of the Fourth Carrier Division were assigned to the Main Body of the 1st Mobile Fleet, commanded by Vice Admiral Jisaburō Ozawa. The Main Body's role was to act as decoys to attract attention away from the two other forces approaching from the south and west. All forces were to converge on Leyte Gulf on 25 October and the Main Body left Japan on 20 October. By the morning of 24 October, the Main Body was within range of the northernmost American carriers of Task Force 38 and Ozawa ordered an air strike launched by the Third Carrier Division (Hyūga and Ise had no aircraft aboard) to attract the attention of the Americans. This accomplished little else as the Japanese aircraft failed to penetrate past the defending fighters; the survivors landed at airfields on Luzon. The Americans were preoccupied dealing with the other Japanese naval forces and defending themselves from air attacks launched from Luzon and Leyte and could not spare any aircraft to search for the Japanese carriers until the afternoon. They finally found them, but Admiral William Halsey, Jr., commander of Task Force 38, decided that it was too late in the day to mount an effective strike. He did, however, turn all of his ships north to position himself for a dawn attack on the Japanese carriers the next day.

On the morning of 25 October, Hyūga was positioned near the light carriers Chitose and Chiyoda to protect them with her anti-aircraft guns. Her radar picked up the first of five American airstrikes at a range of 125 nautical miles (232 km; 144 mi) at 07:13, but the battleship was not a primary target. Fragments from near misses by bombs damaged the ship's anti-torpedo blister and she developed a 5° list that was easily corrected. Despite Hyūga's protection, Chiyoda was set afire and her engines were disabled. Matsuda ordered the battleship and the light cruiser Isuzu to tow the crippled carrier, but Hyūga was unable to do so and rejoined the main body at 18:30. The American submarine USS Halibut spotted the Fourth Carrier Division at 17:42 and manoeuvered to attack, missing with six torpedoes at 18:43. At 19:00 Ozawa ordered Matsuda to take his ships south to defend Isuzu and her escorting destroyers that were attempting to rescue Chiyoda's survivors, despite gunfire from a group of four American cruisers. Unable to locate either group of ships, Ozawa ordered Matsuda to reverse course at 23:30 and head for Amami Ōshima to refuel. Despite being spotted by American submarines en route, the division arrived safely on 27 October. That same day Ozawa transferred his flag to Hyūga. After leaving the island the following day, they were unsuccessfully attacked by the submarine USS Sea Dog before their arrival at Kure on the 29th.

Between 29 October and 8 November, the catapults were removed to improve the firing arcs of No. 3 and No. 4 turrets. Hyūga and Ise departed on 11 November, loaded with troops and munitions for Manila, capital of the Philippines, but news was received of heavy American air attacks on Manila and they were diverted to the Spratly Islands. They arrived on 14 November and their cargo was unloaded so it could be transshipped to the Philippines. The 4th Carrier Division was transferred to the 2nd Fleet the following day. Reinforced by the battleship Haruna and three cruisers, the sisters proceeded on to Lingga Island, near Singapore, on 20 November. They arrived two days later and remained there until 12 December when they departed for Cam Ranh Bay, French Indochina, where they were on standby for an attack on an American supply convoy bound for the island of Mindanao in the Philippines. Vice Admiral Kiyohide Shima, commander of the 5th Fleet, hoisted his flag aboard Hyūga two days later. The attack was cancelled on the 30th and the ships sailed for Singapore where they arrived on 1 January 1945 before continuing on to Lingga. That same day the Fourth Carrier Division was transferred to the Southwest Area Fleet and Shima hauled his flag down. On 6 February, the division sailed for Singapore to participate in Operation Kita. The sisters and the light cruiser Ōyodo were loaded with critically needed strategic war supplies (oil, rubber, tin, zinc, and mercury) and 1,150 surplus oil workers to be ferried back to Japan.

=== Final role ===
The division sailed from Singapore on 10 February 1945 and was spotted by the British submarine HMS Tantalus the following day. Tantalus was forced to submerge by a maritime patrol aircraft and was unable to attack. On 13 February the submarine USS Bergall unsuccessfully attacked the ships as did the submarine USS Blower. Later that afternoon, Ōyodo launched one of her floatplanes which spotted the submarine USS Bashaw on the surface about 22 kilometres (14 mi) ahead of the convoy. Hyūga opened fire with her main guns and forced Bashaw to submerge when one of her shells landed within 1,600 metres (1 mi) of the submarine. The convoy reached the Matsu Islands, off the Chinese coast, on the 15th and was unsuccessfully attacked by the submarine USS Rasher before they reached Zhoushan Island, near Shanghai, that night. The convoy reached Kure on 20 February, having evaded or escaped pursuit by twenty-three Allied submarines along the way.

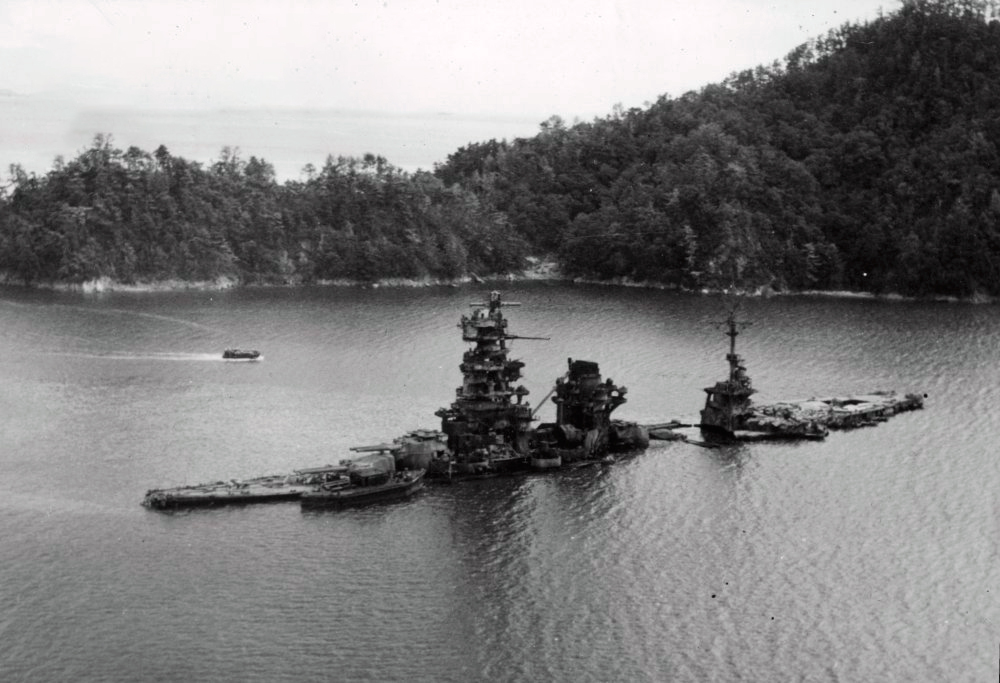
Hyūga sunk in shallow waters

The 4th Carrier Division was disbanded on 1 March and Hyūga was reduced to first-class reserve. Rear Admiral Kiyoshi Kusakawa relieved Nomura that same day. From this time until the surrender of Japan, Hyūga was anchored in Hiroshima Bay without fuel or aircraft. More than 240 American carrier-based aircraft from Task Force 58 attacked Kure on 19 March and the ship was hit by three bombs, killing 37 and wounding 52 crewmen. Her anti-aircraft guns claimed to have shot down a single Curtiss SB2C Helldiver dive bomber during the attack. Re-designated as a fourth-class reserve ship on 20 April, Hyūga was towed to a new position within Hiroshima Bay and heavily camouflaged. She was later attacked during the bombing of Kure on 24 July and was struck by 10 bombs that blew off part of her stem, destroyed her bridge and started major fires. Over 200 sailors were killed, including Kusakawa, and 600 wounded by the attack. Progressive flooding caused the ship to sink in shallow water over the next several days and her crew was ordered to remove all easily accessible weapons. Hyūga was unsuccessfully attacked by 24 USAAF Consolidated B-24 Liberator heavy bombers on the 29th and abandoned three days later by her crew. She was removed from the Navy List on 20 November 1945. Her wreck was raised and broken up by the Kure Dockyard of the Harima Zōsen Corporation from 2 July 1946 to 4 July 1947.
