= 634th Naval Air Group =

- Active: May 1, 1944 – postwar.
- Country: Empire of Japan
- Allegiance: Empire of Japan
- Branch: (Empire of Japan) Imperial Japanese Navy
- Type: Naval aviation unit
- Role: Bomber, reconnaissance
- Size: 48 aircraft (initial)
- Part of: 4th Carrier Division; 2nd Air Fleet; 1st Air Fleet; 5th Air Fleet; 32nd Air Flotilla
- Garrison/HQ: Iwakuni, Japan; Kure, Japan; Battleship Hyūga; Cavite, Philippines; Donggang, Taiwan; Genkai, Japan; Ibusuki, Japan; Sakura Island, Japan
- Aircraft flown: E16A Zuiun "Paul"; D4Y Suisei "Judy"; D3A Type 99 "Val"; B6N Tenzan "Jill"; A6M Type 0 "Zeke"; E13A Type 0 "Jake"
- Engagements: World War II: Formosa Air Battle; Philippines Campaign; Battle of Okinawa

Insignia
- Identification symbol: 634 or squadron code

The 634th Naval Air Group (第六三四海軍航空隊, Dai Roku-San-Yon Kaigun Kōkūtai) was a carrier air group (later converted to airbase garrison unit) of the Imperial Japanese Navy (IJN) during the Pacific campaign of World War II.

== Structure ==
- Higher unit
  - 4th Carrier Division (1 May 1944–14 November 1944)
  - 2nd Air Fleet (15 November 1944–7 January 1945)
  - 1st Air Fleet (8 January 1945–24 May 1945)
  - 5th Air Fleet (25 May 1945–2 August 1945)
  - 32nd Air Flotilla (3 August 1945–postwar)
- Lower unit
  - 163rd Fighter Squadron (1 August 1944–14 November 1944)
  - 167th Fighter Squadron (15 August 1944–14 November 1944)
  - 301st Reconnaissance Squadron (1 January 1945–postwar)
  - 302nd Reconnaissance Squadron (1 July 1945–postwar)
- Commanding officers
  - Cdr. / Capt. Amagai Takehisa (51) - 1 May 1944 - 15 November 1944 (Captain on 15 October 1944.)
  - Cdr. Emura Nichio (57) - 15 November 1944 - 3 July 1945
  - Capt. Katsumi Korokuro (51) - 3 July 1945 - 15 September 1945

== Bibliography ==
- The Japanese Modern Historical Manuscripts Association, Organizations, structures and personnel affairs of the Imperial Japanese Army & Navy, University of Tokyo Press, Tōkyō, Japan, 1971, ISBN 978-4-13-036009-8.
- Bunrin-Dō Co., Ltd., Tōkyō, Japan.
  - Famous airplanes of the world No. 47, Imperial Japanese Navy Reconnaissance Seaplane, 1994.
  - Famous airplanes of the world No. 69, Navy Carrier Dive-Bomber "Suisei", 1998, ISBN 4-89319-066-0.
  - Koku-Fan Illustrated No. 42, Japanese Imperial Army & Navy Aircraft Color, Markig, 1988.
- Model Art, Model Art Co. Ltd., Tōkyō, Japan.
  - No. 439, Special issue Heroes of the Imperial Japanese Navy Air Force in 1937–1945, 1994.
  - No. 510, Special issue Camouflage & Markings of the I.J.N. Fighters, 1998.
  - No. 565, Special issue Imperial Japanese Navy Seaplanes, 2000.
- Japan Center for Asian Historical Records (, National Archives of Japan, Tōkyō, Japan.
  - Reference Code: C08051771200, Transition table of formation of Imperial Japan Navy Air Units (special establishment) during Pacific War, Japan Demobilization Agency, 1949.
