= USS Bashaw =

United States Navy submarine (1943–1969)

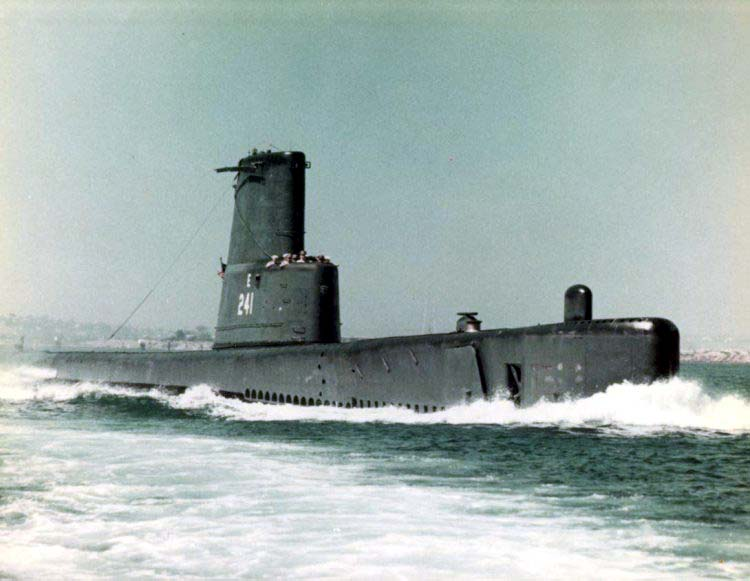
- USS Bashaw (SSK-241) in the 1950s.

History

United States
- Builder: General Dynamics Electric Boat, Groton, Connecticut
- Laid down: 4 December 1942
- Launched: 25 July 1943
- Sponsored by: Mrs. Norman S. Ives
- Commissioned: 25 October 1943
- Decommissioned: 29 June 1949
- Recommissioned: 3 April 1951
- Decommissioned: 10 May 1952
- Recommissioned: 28 March 1953
- Decommissioned: 13 September 1969
- Stricken: 13 September 1969
- Fate: Sunk as target July 1972 or sold for scrap 4 August 1972 (sources disagree)

General characteristics
- Class & type: Gato-class diesel-electric submarine
- Displacement: 1,525 long tons (1,549 t) surfaced; 2,424 long tons (2,463 t) submerged
- Length: 311 ft 9 in (95.02 m)
- Beam: 27 ft 3 in (8.31 m)
- Draft: 17 ft (5.2 m) maximum
- Propulsion: 4 × General Motors Model 16-248 V16 Diesel engines driving electric generators; 2 × 126-cell Sargo batteries; 4 × high-speed General Electric electric motors with reduction gears; two propellers; 5,400 shp (4.0 MW) surfaced; 2,740 shp (2.0 MW) submerged
- Speed: 21 kn (39 km/h) surfaced, 9 kn (17 km/h) submerged
- Range: 11,000 nmi (20,000 km) surfaced @ 10 kn (19 km/h)
- Endurance: 48 hours @ 2 kn (3.7 km/h) submerged, 75 days on patrol
- Test depth: 300 ft (91 m)
- Complement: 6 officers, 54 enlisted
- Armament: 10 × 21-inch (533 mm) torpedo tubes; 6 forward, 4 aft; 24 torpedoes; 1 × 3-inch (76 mm) / 50 caliber deck gun; Bofors 40 mm and Oerlikon 20 mm cannon

USS Bashaw (SS/SSK/AGSS-241), a Gato-class submarine, was the first ship of the United States Navy to be named for the bashaw. Between 10 March 1944 and 29 April 1945, she completed six war patrols in the Celebes, Philippine, and South China Seas during World War II. Bashaw sank three Japanese merchant vessels totaling 19,269 gross register tons as well as several small craft. She later served in the Vietnam War.

== Construction and commissioning ==
Bashaw was laid down on 4 December 1942 by Electric Boat Company, Groton, Conn. She was launched on 25 July 1943, sponsored by Mrs. Florence Ives, wife of Captain Norman S. Ives (killed 2 August 1944 near Dol-de-Bretagne, France, while commanding a naval patrol), and commissioned on 25 October 1943, Lieutenant Commander Richard E. Nichols in command.

== Service history ==
=== World War II ===
Following shakedown training in Long Island Sound, Bashaw proceeded south to provide services for the Fleet Sound School at Key West, Florida. She ended 1943 in training off Florida.

On 9 January 1944, Bashaw got underway for duty in the Pacific Ocean. She transited the Panama Canal on 14 January and exercised with the submarines USS Flounder (SS-251) and USS Golet (SS-361) off the Panama Canal Zone before beginning a voyage to New Guinea. She reported to Commander, Task Force (TF) 72, at Milne Bay, New Guinea, on 3 March 1944.

==== First war patrol ====
After voyage repairs and provisioning, Bashaw and the submarine USS Blackfish (SS-221) got underway on 10 March 1944 to patrol off the Palau Islands in the hope of intercepting Japanese ships trying to escape through Toagel Mlungui Pass. On the night of 21 March 1944, Bashaw conducted a surface radar attack on what she believed to be a Japanese submarine tender. Firing six torpedoes, Bashaw scored one hit, but she was unable to regain position to sink what proved to be the salvage ship Urakami Maru. While the Japanese destroyer Yūzuki screened the operation, the destroyer Minazuki towed the crippled ship to safety.

On 13 April 1944, a U.S. Navy PB4Y-1 Liberator patrol bomber mistakenly bombed Bashaw in the Pacific Ocean 415 nautical miles (769 km; 478 mi) west-southwest of Truk Atoll at 04°30′N 147°26′E. Bashaw submerged and avoided damage.

On 27 April 1944, Bashaw attacked and damaged three Japanese trawlers with gunfire. On 10 May, she concluded her patrol with her arrival at Brisbane, Australia, for a refit.

==== Second war patrol ====
Bashaw got underway on 27 May 1944 for her second war patrol, assigned a patrol area in the waters around Mindanao in the Philippines. During the patrol, she made only one contact, when she attacked a convoy between Halmahera and Taland Island on 25 June 1944. Before the night was over, she scored three torpedo hits on Yamamiya Maru, a 6,440-gross register ton Imperial Japanese Army cargo ship, and sank her. On 16 July 1944, Bashaw moored alongside the submarine tender USS Euryale (AS-22) in Seeadler Harbor at Manus Island in the Admiralty Islands for a refit.

==== Third war patrol ====
After training exercises, Bashaw stood out of Seeadler Harbor for her third war patrol on 7 August 1944, bound for the Mindanao Sea and Moro Gulf in Philippine waters. Opportunities to attack proved scarce but, on 8 September 1944 she approached what turned out to be the Japanese cargo ship Yanagigawa Maru. Bashaw fired a six-torpedo salvo from periscope depth and scored three hits that sent Yanagigawa Maru to the bottom. She completed her patrol by providing lifeguard services during carrier air strikes against Cagayan, Mindanao. On 9 September 1944, she assisted four airplanes to sink a 225-gross register ton interisland supply ship loaded with drums of fuel oil. Bashaw rescued one of the ship's crew members and later turned him over to the authorities in Australia. Bashaw also rescued an American fighter pilot on 19 September 1944 before ending her patrol at Brisbane on 4 October 1944.

==== Fourth war patrol ====
Following a refit, Bashaw began her fourth war patrol on 27 October 1944 in a coordinated attack group which also included the submarines Flounder (SS-251) and USS Guavina (SS-362). They proceeded to the coast of Japanese-occupied French Indochina to patrol in the South China Sea, but found meager pickings. Finally, a small Japanese tanker crossed Bashaw′s track on 21 November 1944. Bashaw fired four torpedoes and scored one hit. The lone hit failed to damage the tanker severely enough to sink her, and Bashaw was unable to reach a firing position again. Continuing the patrol, Bashaw sighted a large and heavily escorted Japanese task force on 14 December 1944. Although unable to attack, she reported the contact. On 25 December 1944, Bashaw made a submerged transit of Lombok Strait while returning to Australia, where she arrived at Fremantle on 31 December 1944. She began the year 1945 undergoing refit alongside Euryale.

==== Fifth war patrol ====
Bashaw stood out of Fremantle on 26 January 1945 and set course for her designated patrol area along the east coast of Hainan Island in the eastern part of the Gulf of Tonkin and off the northeastern coast of French Indochina. Bashaw sank one small coastal freighter on 10 February 1945, then joined the submarine USS Flasher (SS-249) in pursuing another, which they sank with gunfire. On 25 February 1945, Bashaw mounted several unsuccessful attacks against a small cargo ship. Flasher later finished off the ship. On 27 February 1945, Bashaw again worked with Flasher in sinking two "sea trucks" and damaging two others.

On 5 March 1944, a heavy fog hindered Bashaw′s patrolling until radar picked up a contact. She approached in daylight, surfaced, and fired six torpedoes at what turned out to be the 10,000-gross register ton tanker Ryoei Maru. Two torpedoes scored, and Bashaw's crew cheered as Ryoei Maru sank. On 6 March, Bashaw sank another "sea truck," then made for Subic Bay on Luzon in the Philippines, where she moored alongside the submarine tender USS Griffin (AS-13) on 12 March 1945.

==== Sixth war patrol ====
Bashaw got underway on 27 March 1945 for her sixth war patrol, which she also conducted off French Indochina and Hainan Island. Japanese forces were stretched thin, and she found no worthy targets. On 29 April 1945, she stood into Subic Bay.

==== May–August 1945 ====
At Subic Bay, Bashaw received orders to continue on to Mare Island, California, for overhaul at Mare Island Navy Yard. Upon completion of overhaul, she departed the Mare Island Navy Yard for Pearl Harbor, Hawaii, on 13 August 1945. During her voyage, hostilities with Japan ended on 15 August 1945.

=== Post-World War II ===
==== 1945–1949 ====
Upon her arrival at Pearl Harbor on 22 August 1945, Bashaw received orders to return to Mare Island Navy Yard to prepare for inactivation. On 5 September 1945, she arrived there and began her pre-inactivation overhaul, going into commission in reserve there on 24 November 1945. She remained berthed at Mare Island until her status was changed to out of commission in reserve on 20 June 1949, after which she was laid up in the Pacific Reserve Fleet.

==== 1951–1969 ====
Bashaw was recommissioned on 3 April 1951 and operated from San Diego, California, along the United States West Coast in local operations and training until 10 May 1952. She then was placed out of commission in reserve at Hunters Point Naval Shipyard in San Francisco, California, where from May 1952 to March 1953, she underwent conversion to a Type IT anti-submarine "hunter-killer submarine". Accordingly, she was reclassified SSK-241 on 18 February 1953.

After the completion of her conversion, Bashaw was recommissioned on 28 March 1953 and reported to Submarine Division 33 (SubDiv 33) at San Diego. From March to August 1954, she made a Far Eastern cruise. During 1955, she took part in several submarine exercises, including one major exercise in the Hawaiian Islands area, before beginning an overhaul at Hunters Point on 28 June 1955.

When her overhaul was completed five months later, Bashaw was ordered to her new home port, Pearl Harbor, Hawaii. There she commenced a career of providing training services to antisubmarine warfare forces, deploying to the Far East as operational needs arose and participating in fleet exercises for readiness training. From January to August 1956, she conducted her second post-World War II tour of the Far East, completing it on 14 August 1956 with her arrival at the Submarine Base, Pearl Harbor.

Lieutenant Don Walsh relinquished command of Bashaw in 1959 to serve aboard the bathyscaphe Trieste. In January 1960, Walsh and Jacques Piccard made a record descent in Trieste to the bottom of the Challenger Deep, the deepest known point of the seabed of Earth.

Bashaw reverted to her original designation, SS-241, in August 1959. She was redesignated as an auxiliary submarine, AGSS-241, on 1 September 1962. In October 1962, she ended a lengthy transpacific training cruise with her arrival at the 1962 World's Fair in Seattle, Washington. She returned to Hawaii to enter the Pearl Harbor Naval Shipyard in April 1963 for a four-month overhaul.

Bashaw deployed to the Western Pacific in August 1964 after the Gulf of Tonkin incident, in which North Vietnamese Navy torpedo boats confronted the U.S. Navy destroyers USS Maddox (DD-731) on 2 August and may have confronted the destroyer USS Turner Joy (DD-951) on 4 August. Bashaw was one of several submarines alerted for support during retaliatory air strikes on North Vietnam by U.S. forces, but she ended the cruise in October 1964 without incident.

Bashaw′s home port reverted to San Diego, but she continued to deploy to the western Pacific in 1965. She patrolled in the Gulf of Tonkin as the American involvement in the Vietnam War escalated. Upon her return to San Diego on 21 December 1965, she resumed antisubmarine warfare training operations until she entered the Hunters Point Naval Shipyard on 16 May 1966 for a four-month overhaul.

Bashaw continued her routine of western Pacific deployments alternating with antisubmarine warfare training until the results of an operations readiness inspection on 3 July 1969 determined that she was too old to continue naval service.

== Decommissioning and disposal ==
Bashaw was finally decommissioned on 13 September 1969 at San Francisco and struck from the Naval Vessel Register the same day. She was the last Gato-class submarine to be decommissioned. Sources claim both that she was sunk as a target off Hawaii in July 1972 and that she was sold for scrap to the National Metal and Steel Corporation on 4 August 1972.

== Honors and awards ==
- Asiatic–Pacific Campaign Medal with five battle stars for World War II service
- Korean Service Medal
- Vietnam Service Medal with three service stars for Vietnam War service

== In popular culture ==
The 1978 Donny and Marie Osmond movie Goin' Coconuts includes an underwater picture of Bashaw′s wreck in the background of a scene. In the movie's plot, the wreck is loaded with gold bars.
