= Shintarō Hashimoto =

Imperial Japanese admiral (1892–1945)

- 橋本 信太郎
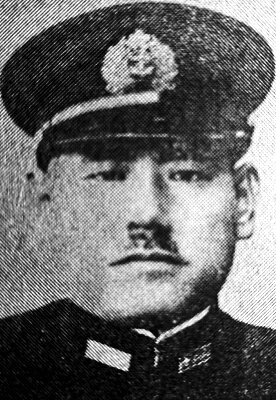
- Born: May 11, 1892; Wakayama Prefecture, Japan
- Died: May 16, 1945 (aged 53); Strait of Malacca, near Penang
- Military career
- Allegiance: Empire of Japan
- Branch: Imperial Japanese Navy
- Service years: 1913–1945
- Rank: Vice Admiral
- Commands: Yūdachi, Nashi, 21st Torpedo Division, 5th Destroyer Division, 20th Destroyer Division, 7th Destroyer Division, Chikuma, Hyūga, 3rd Destroyer Squadron, Naval Torpedo School, 5th Squadron
- Conflicts: World War II; Pacific War; Invasion of Malaya; Tokyo Express; Operation Ke; Battle of the Malacca Strait †

Shintarō Hashimoto (橋本 信太郎, Hashimoto Shintarō; 11 May 1892 – 16 May 1945) was an admiral in the Imperial Japanese Navy during World War II.

== Biography ==
Hashimoto was born in Wakayama prefecture. He graduated from the 41st class of the Imperial Japanese Naval Academy in 1913. He was ranked 43rd in a class of 118 cadets. As a midshipman, he was assigned to the cruisers Asama and Chikuma. On receiving his commission as ensign, he was assigned back to Chikuma, then to Yahagi.

After attending torpedo school and naval artillery school, Hashimoto served on the destroyer Kamikaze. He was promoted to lieutenant in 1919, and served on the destroyer Kaede, as executive officer on destroyer Hasu, chief torpedo officer on destroyer Okikaze and (in 1923), captain of the destroyer Nashi.

After graduating from the 24th class of Naval Staff College in 1924 and his promotion to lieutenant commander, Hashimoto was assigned to the staff of the Kure Naval District. He was promoted to commander in 1930. Hashimoto served as commander of various destroyer task forces through the 1930s, winning promotion to captain in 1935. He was Chief of Staff of the Ryojun Guard District from 1937 to 1939, and assumed command of the cruiser Chikuma from 1939 to 1940 and battleship Hyūga from 1940 to 1941. He was promoted to rear admiral on 15 October 1941.

At the time of the attack on Pearl Harbor, Hashimoto was in command of the 3rd Destroyer Flotilla, covering landings of Japanese forces in Malaya. From August until late-November, 1942, he commanded Tokyo Express missions during the Guadalcanal Campaign. In January 1943, Hashimoto's destroyers participated in "Operation Ke", and successfully evacuated 11,700 surviving Japanese troops from Guadalcanal.

From March to October 1943, Hashimoto received a shore assignment and became Commandant of the Torpedo School. Assigned to command the 5th Cruiser Division in November 1943, he was promoted to vice admiral on 15 October 1944.

From his flagship, the cruiser Haguro, he commanded the 5th Cruiser Division, which was defeated by Royal Navy warships during the Battle of the Malacca Strait on 16 May 1945. Haguro and the destroyer Kamikaze were in the Bay of Bengal off the northern tip of Sumatra attempting to transport food and supplies to the Japanese garrison in the Andaman Islands when they were ambushed by five British destroyers. During the battle, Haguro was hit repeatedly by torpedoes and gunfire. She sank, and Admiral Hashimoto was killed.
