= Japanese torpedo boat Kasasagi =

Two Japanese warships have borne the name Kasasagi:

- Japanese torpedo boat Kasasagi (1899), a Hayabusa-class torpedo boat launched in 1899 and stricken in 1921
- Japanese torpedo boat Kasasagi (1935), an Ōtori-class torpedo boat launched in 1935 and sunk in 1943
