= Japanese ship Shirataka =

Two Japanese warships have borne the name Shirataka:

- Japanese torpedo boat Shirataka, a torpedo boat launched in 1899 and stricken in 1923
- Japanese minelayer Shirataka, a minelayer launched in 1929 and sunk in 1944
