= Ise-class battleship =

Class of dreadnought battleship

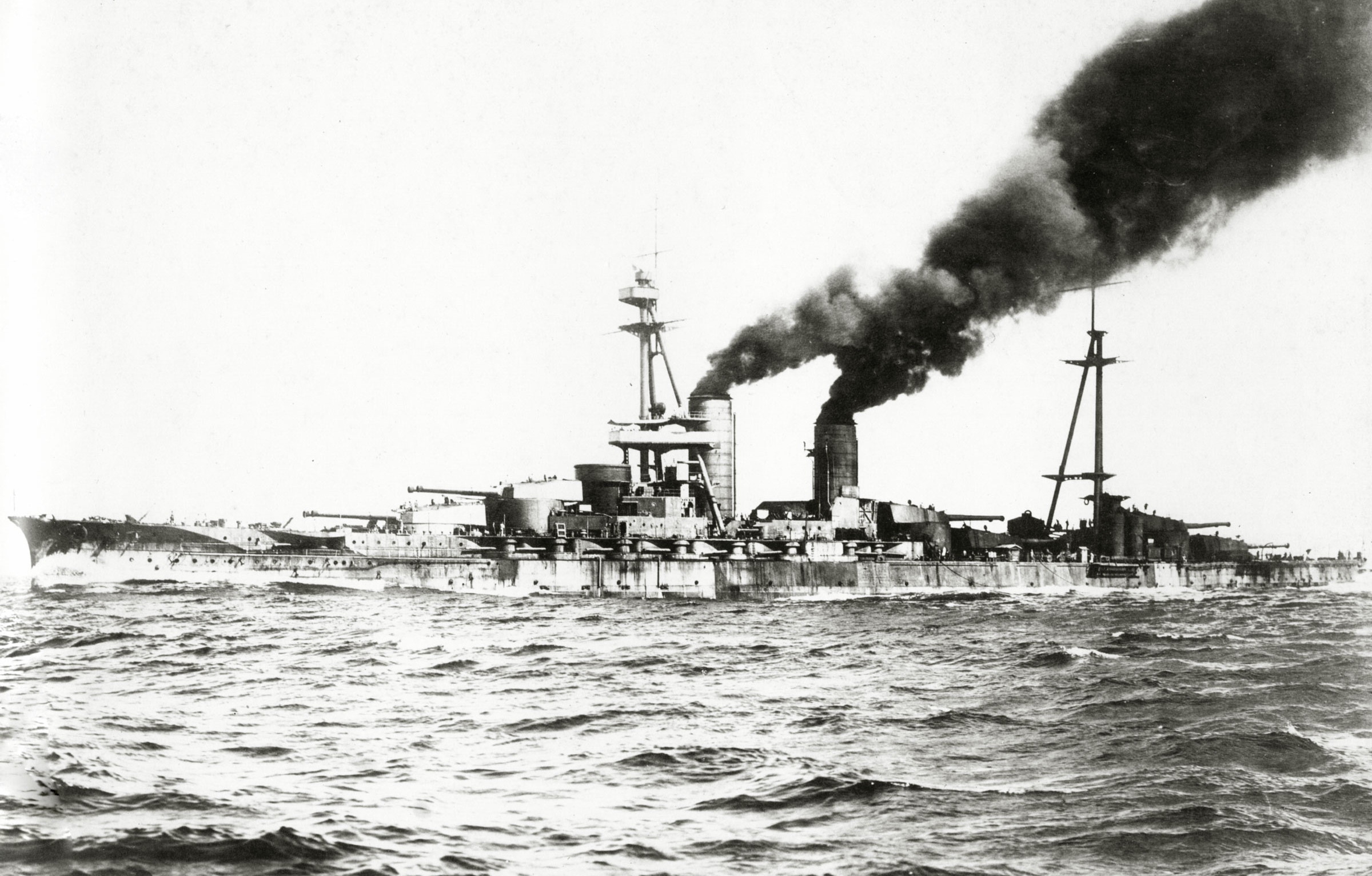
- Ise at speed, shortly after completion

Class overview
- Name: Ise class
- Builders: Kawasaki, Kobe; Mitsubishi, Nagasaki
- Operators: Imperial Japanese Navy
- Preceded by: Fusō class
- Succeeded by: Nagato class
- Built: 1915–1918
- In service: 1917–1945
- Completed: 2
- Lost: 2

General characteristics (as built)
- Type: Dreadnought battleship
- Displacement: 31,260 long tons (31,762 t) (normal)
- Length: 208.18 m (683 ft)
- Beam: 28.65 m (94 ft)
- Draught: 8.93 m (29 ft 4 in)
- Installed power: 24 × water-tube boilers; 40,000–45,000 shp (30,000–34,000 kW)
- Propulsion: 4 × shafts; 2 × steam turbine sets
- Speed: 23 knots (43 km/h; 26 mph)
- Range: 9,680 nmi (17,930 km; 11,140 mi) at 14 knots (26 km/h; 16 mph)
- Complement: 1,360
- Armament: 6 × twin 35.6 cm (14 in) guns; 20 × single 14 cm (5.5 in) guns; 4 × single 7.62 cm (3 in) AA guns; 6 × 53.3 cm (21 in) torpedo tubes
- Armour: Waterline belt: 299 mm (11.8 in); Decks: 85 mm (3.3 in); Gun turrets: 254 mm (10 in); Barbettes: 305 mm (12 in); Conning tower: 305 mm (12 in); Bulkheads: 199–224 mm (7.8–8.8 in)

General characteristics (after first reconstruction)
- Displacement: 42,001 long tons (42,675 t) (deep load)
- Length: 216 m (708 ft 8 in)
- Beam: 31.75 m (104 ft 2 in)
- Draught: 9.45 m (31 ft)
- Installed power: 8 × water-tube boilers; 80,000 shp (60,000 kW)
- Propulsion: 4 × steam turbines
- Speed: 25 knots (46 km/h; 29 mph)
- Range: 7,870 nmi (14,580 km; 9,060 mi) at 16 knots (30 km/h; 18 mph)
- Complement: 1,376
- Armament: 6 × twin 35.6 cm guns; 16 × single 14 cm guns; 4 × twin 12.7 cm (5 in) DP guns; 10 × twin 25 mm (1 in) AA guns
- Armour: Decks: 51–152 mm (2–6 in)
- Aircraft carried: 3
- Aviation facilities: 1 catapult

General characteristics (as hybrid carriers, 1945)
- Displacement: 42,675 long tons (43,360 t) (deep load)
- Length: 219.62 m (720 ft 6 in)
- Beam: 31.71 m (104 ft)
- Draught: 9.03 m (29 ft 8 in)
- Range: 9,500 nmi (17,600 km; 10,900 mi) at 16 knots
- Complement: 1,463
- Sensors & processing systems: 1 × Type 21 air-search radar; 2 × Type 13 early warning radars; 2 × Type 22 surface-search radars
- Armament: 4 × twin 35.6 cm guns; 8 × twin 12.7 cm DP guns; 31 × triple, 11 × single 25 mm AA guns; 6 × 30-round AA rocket launchers
- Aircraft carried: 22
- Aviation facilities: 2 catapults

The Ise-class battleships (伊勢型戦艦, Ise-gata senkan) were a pair of dreadnought battleships built for the Imperial Japanese Navy (IJN) during World War I. Both ships carried supplies for the survivors of the Great Kantō earthquake in 1923. They were modernized in 1934–1937 with improvements to their armour and machinery and a rebuilt superstructure in the pagoda mast style. Afterwards they played a minor role in the Second Sino-Japanese War.

Despite the expensive reconstructions, both vessels were considered obsolete by the eve of the Pacific War, and neither saw significant action in the early years of the war. Following the loss of most of the IJN's large aircraft carriers during the Battle of Midway in mid-1942, they were rebuilt with a flight deck replacing the rear pair of gun turrets to give them the ability to operate an air group of floatplanes. A lack of aircraft and qualified pilots, however, meant that they never actually operated their aircraft in combat. While awaiting their air group, the sister ships were occasionally used to ferry troops and material to Japanese bases. They participated in the Battle off Cape Engaño in late 1944, where they decoyed the American carrier fleet supporting the invasion of Leyte away from the landing beaches. Afterwards both ships were transferred to Southeast Asia; in early 1945 they participated in Operation Kita, where they transported petrol and other strategic materials to Japan. The sisters were then reduced to reserve until they were sunk during American airstrikes in July. After the war they were scrapped in 1946–1947.

== Background ==
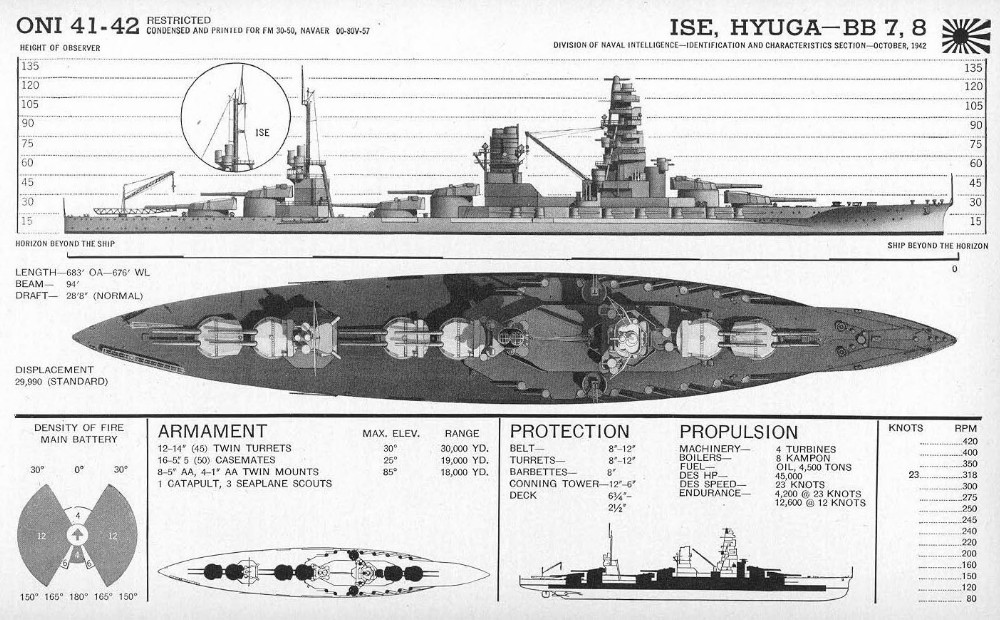
Office of Naval Intelligence recognition drawing

The design of the Ise-class battleships was shaped both by the ongoing international naval arms race and a desire among Japanese naval planners to maintain a fleet of capital ships powerful enough to defeat the United States Navy in an encounter in Japanese territorial waters. The IJN's fleet of battleships had proven highly successful in 1905, the last year of the Russo-Japanese War, which culminated in the destruction of the Russian Second and Third Pacific Squadrons at the Battle of Tsushima.

In the aftermath, the Japanese Empire immediately turned its focus to the two remaining rivals for imperial dominance in the Pacific Ocean: Britain and the United States. Satō Tetsutarō, a Japanese Navy admiral and military theorist, speculated that conflict would inevitably arise between Japan and at least one of its two main rivals. To that end, he called for the Japanese Navy to maintain a fleet with at least 70% as many capital ships as the US Navy. This ratio, Satō theorized, would enable the Imperial Japanese Navy to defeat the US Navy in one major battle in Japanese waters in any eventual conflict. Accordingly, the 1907 Imperial Defence Policy called for the construction of a battle fleet of eight modern battleships, 20,000 long tons (20,321 t) each, and eight modern armoured cruisers, 18,000 long tons (18,289 t) each. This was the genesis of the Eight-Eight Fleet Program, the development of a cohesive battle line of sixteen capital ships.

The launch of HMS Dreadnought in 1906 by the Royal Navy raised the stakes, and complicated Japan's plans. Displacing 17,900 long tons (18,187 t) and armed with ten 12-inch (30.5 cm) guns, Dreadnought rendered all existing battleships obsolete by comparison. The launch of the battlecruiser HMS Invincible the following year was a further setback for Japan's quest for parity. When the two new Satsuma-class battleships and two Tsukuba-class armoured cruisers, launched by 1911, were outclassed by their British counterparts, the Eight-Eight Fleet Program was restarted.

The first battleships built for the renewed Eight-Eight Fleet Program were the two dreadnoughts of the Kawachi class, ordered in 1907 and laid down in 1908. In 1910, the Navy put forward a request to the Diet (parliament) to secure funding for the entirety of the program at once. Because of economic constraints, only four battlecruisers and a single battleship of the Fusō class were ultimately approved by the Diet. Three more Fusō-class ships (Yamashiro, Ise, and Hyūga) were approved and all three were ordered in April 1913. While Yamashiro was laid down later that year, the IJN lacked the funding to proceed with the construction of Ise and Hyūga until the Diet authorized additional funding for the ships in July 1914.

== Design and description ==
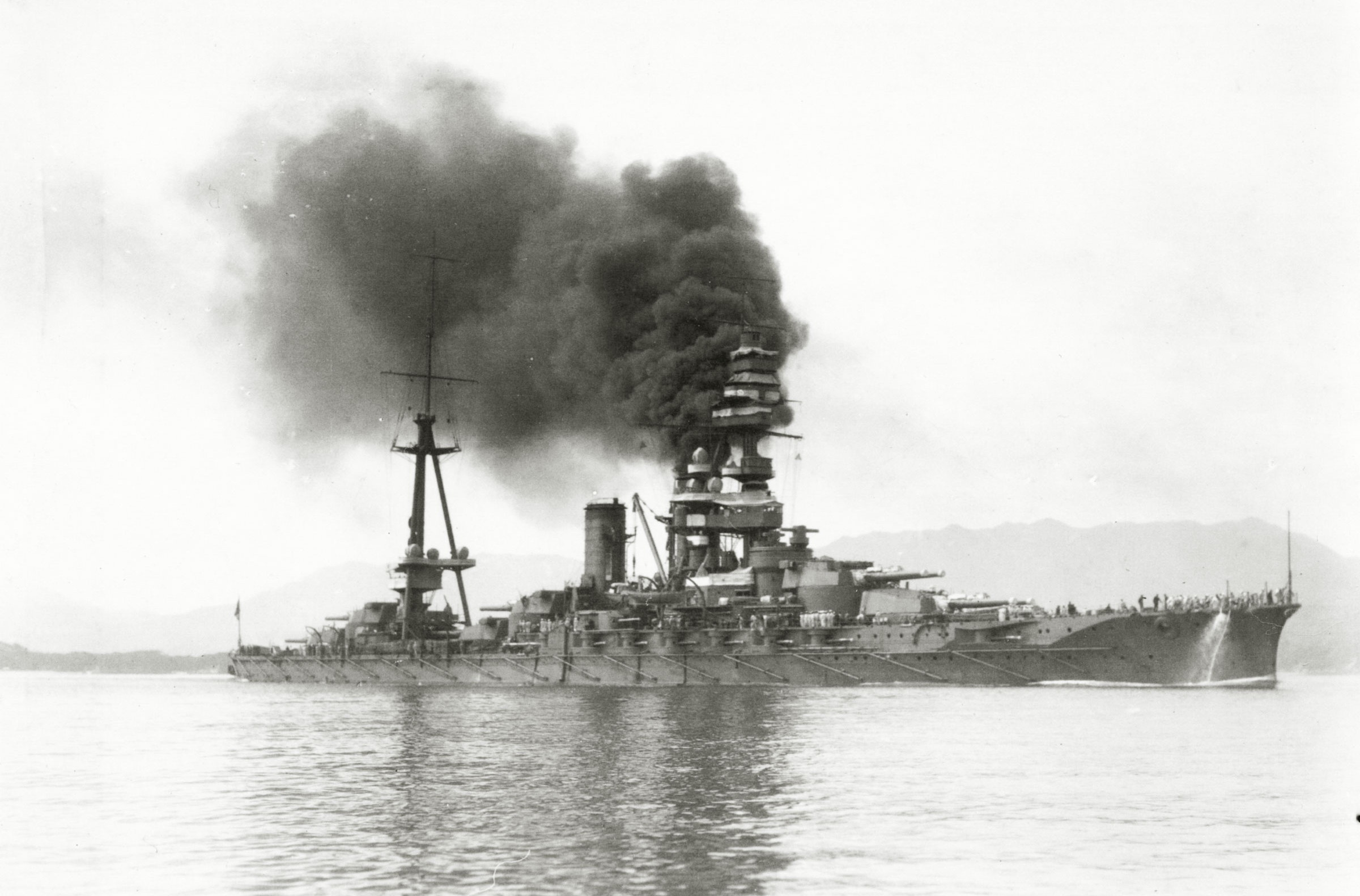
Ise underway during the 1920s

The progress of Fusō's construction, while the IJN waited for the funding to be released and foreign developments, caused the IJN to reassess the Fusō-class design. The distribution of the midships gun turrets was the most obvious flaw as they complicated the protection of the midships magazine and exposed more of the ship to the blast effects of the guns when they fired. Another issue was that Japanese sailors had problems maintaining a high rate of fire with the 45.36-kilogram (100 lb) shells used in the manually loaded 152-millimetre (6 in) secondary guns used in the Fusō class and earlier designs. To resolve this issue, the IJN designed a smaller 140-millimetre (5.5 in) gun that offset its lighter shell weight with a higher rate of fire. It also decided that the barbette armour of the earlier ships was too thin and wanted a modest increase in speed to partially counter the higher speeds of the latest foreign ships like the British Queen Elizabeth-class battleships and Russian Borodino-class battlecruisers. For financial reasons more powerful engines could not be ordered so the new design was lengthened slightly and the boiler rooms enlarged to increase speed by 0.5 knots (0.93 km/h; 0.58 mph) to 23 knots (43 km/h; 26 mph). To save weight the forecastle deck was shortened so that the lower midships gun turret was lower than in the Fusō class. This reduced the crew's accommodations despite a significant increase in the crew's numbers and naval historian Fukui Shizuo believed that these ships had the worst habitability of any Japanese capital ship. The final design was designated A-92 by the IJN.

The ships had a length of 208.18 metres (683 ft) overall, a beam of 28.65 metres (94 ft) and a draught of 8.93 metres (29 ft 4 in) at deep load. They displaced 31,260 long tons (31,762 t) at normal load and 36,500 long tons (37,086 t) at deep load, roughly 650 long tons (660 t) more than the preceding class. Their crew consisted of 1,360 officers and enlisted men. They had a metacentric height of 1.74 metres (5 ft 9 in) at deep load.

During the ships' modernization during the 1930s, their forward superstructures were enlarged with multiple platforms added to their tripod foremasts. Both ships were also given torpedo bulges to improve their underwater protection and to compensate for the weight of the additional armour. In addition, their sterns were lengthened by 7.62 metres (25 ft). These changes increased their overall length to 213.8 metres (701 ft), their beam to 31.75 metres (104 ft 2 in) and their draft to 9.45 metres (31 ft). Their displacement increased over 5,000 long tons (5,100 t) to 42,001 long tons (42,675 t) at deep load. The crew now numbered 1,376 officers and enlisted men.

=== Propulsion ===
The Ise-class ships had two sets of direct-drive steam turbines, each of which drove two propeller shafts with 3.43-metre (11 ft 3 in) propellers. The high-pressure turbines drove the wing shafts while the low-pressure turbines drove the inner shafts. The turbines were designed to produce a total of 40,000 or 45,000 shaft horsepower (30,000 or 34,000 kW) (Hyūga and Ise respectively), using steam provided by 24 Kampon Ro Gō water-tube boilers at working pressures of 13–16.9 kg/cm^{2} (1,275–1,657 kPa; 185–240 psi). Both ships comfortably exceeded their designed speed of 23 knots (43 km/h; 26 mph) during their sea trials; Ise reached 23.6 knots (43.7 km/h; 27.2 mph) from 56,498 shp (42,131 kW) and Hyūga exceeded that with 24 knots (44 km/h; 28 mph) from 63,211 shp (47,136 kW). Each of the boilers consumed a mixture of coal and oil and the ships had a stowage capacity of 4,607 long tons (4,681 t) of coal and 1,411 long tons (1,434 t) of fuel oil, which gave them a range of 9,680 nautical miles (17,930 km; 11,140 mi) at a speed of 14 knots (26 km/h; 16 mph). Ise and Hyūga had three generators of 150 kilowatts (200 hp) capacity and two 250-kilowatt (340 hp) turbo generators at 225 volts.

During their 1930s modernization, the boilers on each ship were replaced by eight new Kampon oil-fired boilers, fitted into the former aft boiler room, and the forward funnel was removed. The turbines were replaced by four geared Kampon turbines with a designed output of 80,000 shp (60,000 kW) intended to increase their speed to 24.5 knots (45.4 km/h; 28.2 mph). On her trials, Ise reached a top speed of 25.26 knots (46.78 km/h; 29.07 mph) from 81,050 shp (60,440 kW). The fuel storage of the ships was increased to a total of 5,113 long tons (5,195 t) of fuel oil that gave them a range of 7,870 nautical miles (14,580 km; 9,060 mi) at a speed of 16 knots (30 km/h; 18 mph).

=== Armament ===
The twelve 45-calibre 35.6 cm (14 in) Type 41 guns of the Ise class were mounted in three pairs of twin-gun, superfiring turrets. Numbered one through six from front to rear, each turret weighed 655 long tons (666 t). The hydraulically powered turrets had an elevation capability of −5/+20 degrees. The guns had a rate of fire of 1.5–2 rounds per minute and could be loaded at any angle between −3 and +20 degrees. In 1921 the elevation was increased to +30 degrees and then to +43 degrees during their mid-1930s modernization, except for No. 6 turret as its supporting structure could not be lowered. The recoil mechanism of the guns was also changed from a hydraulic to a pneumatic system, which allowed for a faster firing cycle of the main guns.

By World War II, the guns used Type 91 armour-piercing, capped shells. Each of these shells weighed 673.5 kilograms (1,485 lb) and was fired at a muzzle velocity of 770–775 metres per second (2,530–2,540 ft/s). They had a maximum range of 25,000 metres (27,000 yd) at +20 degrees of elevation and 35,450 meters (38,770 yd) at +43 degrees after modernization. Also available was a 625-kilogram (1,378 lb) high-explosive shell that had a muzzle velocity of 805 metres per second (2,640 ft/s). A special Type 3 Sanshikidan incendiary shrapnel shell was developed in the 1930s for anti-aircraft use.

The ships' secondary armament consisted of twenty 50-calibre 14-centimetre (5.5 in) Type 3 guns. Eighteen of these were mounted in casemates in the forecastle and superstructure and the remaining pair were mounted on the deck above them and protected by gun shields. They had a maximum elevation of +20 degrees which gave them a range of 16,300 metres (17,800 yd). Each gun had a rate of fire of up to 10 rounds per minute. Anti-aircraft defence was provided by four 40-calibre 3rd Year Type 8-centimetre (Note: These guns were license-built British quick-firing (QF) QF 12-pounder guns. While the Japanese designated them as 8 cm, their actual calibre was 76.2 mm.) AA guns in single mounts. The 7.62-centimetre (3 in) high-angle guns had a maximum elevation of +75 degrees, and had a rate of fire of 13 to 20 rounds per minute. They fired a 6 kg (13 lb) projectile with a muzzle velocity of 680 m/s (2,200 ft/s) to a maximum height of 7,500 metres (24,600 ft). The ships were also fitted with six submerged 53.3-centimetre (21 in) torpedo tubes, three on each broadside. They carried twelve to eighteen 6th Year Type torpedoes which had a 200-kilogram (440 lb) warhead. They had three settings for range and speed: 15,000 metres (16,000 yd) at 26 knots (48 km/h; 30 mph), 10,000 metres (11,000 yd) at 32 knots (59 km/h; 37 mph), or 7,000 metres (7,700 yd) at 37 knots (69 km/h; 43 mph).

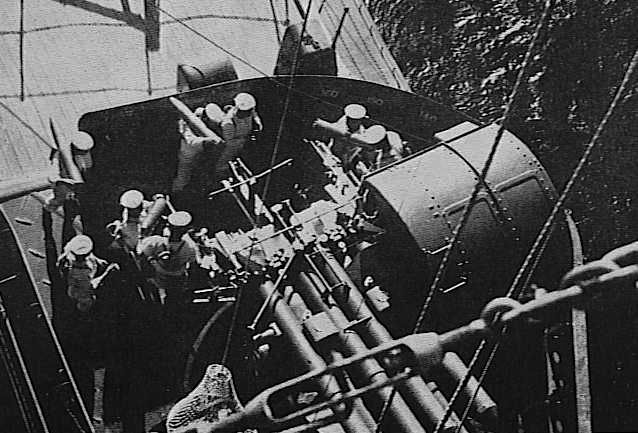
A twin-gun 127 mm mount on board the battleship Nagato. The mounts used on board the Ise class were the same model.

In 1931–1933 the AA guns were replaced with eight 40-calibre 12.7 cm (5 in) Type 89 dual-purpose guns, fitted on both sides of the forward superstructures in four twin-gun mounts. When firing at surface targets, the guns had a range of 14,700 metres (16,100 yd); they had a ceiling of 9,440 metres (30,970 ft) at their maximum elevation of +90 degrees. Their maximum rate of fire was 14 rounds a minute, but their sustained rate of fire was around eight rounds per minute. Two twin-gun mounts for license-built Vickers two-pounder (4-centimetre (1.6 in)) light AA guns were also added. These guns had a maximum elevation of +80 degrees and a rate of fire of 200 rounds per minute. The pair of 14 cm guns on the upper deck were removed at this time.

During the mid-1930s reconstruction, the torpedo tubes were removed and the Vickers two-pounders were replaced by twenty license-built Hotchkiss 2.5-centimetre (1 in) Type 96 light AA guns in 10 twin-gun mounts. This was the standard Japanese light AA gun during World War II, but it suffered from severe design shortcomings that rendered it a largely ineffective weapon. According to historian Mark Stille, the twin and triple mounts "lacked sufficient speed in train or elevation; the gun sights were unable to handle fast targets; the gun exhibited excessive vibration; the magazine was too small, and, finally, the gun produced excessive muzzle blast". These guns had an effective range of 1,500–3,000 metres (1,600–3,300 yd), and an effective ceiling of 5,500 metres (18,000 ft) at an elevation of 85 degrees. The maximum effective rate of fire was only between 110 and 120 rounds per minute because of the frequent need to change the fifteen-round magazines. In addition the forward pair of 14 cm guns in the forecastle were removed at this time and the maximum elevation of the remaining guns was increased to +30 degrees.

=== Protection ===
The Ise-class ships' waterline protective belt had a maximum thickness of 299 mm (11.8 in) of Vickers cemented armour amidships; below it was a strake of 100 mm (3.9 in) armour. The upper armoured deck consisted of two layers of high-tensile steel 55 mm (2.2 in) thick and the lower armoured deck also consisted of two layers of high-tensile steel, but only 30 mm (1.2 in) thick. The sides of this deck sloped downwards to meet the bottom of the lower strake of the belt armour. The ends of the belt armour were closed off by bulkheads that ranged in thickness from 203 to 102 mm (8 to 4 in). The turrets were protected with an armour thickness of 254 mm (10 in) on the face and 76 mm on the roof. The casemate armour was 149 mm (5.9 in) thick and that of the barbettes was 299 mm thick rather than the originally planned 305 mm. The sides of the conning tower were 305 mm thick. (Note: Sources contradict each other regarding the armour scheme of these ships. Lengerer, the most recent researcher using Japanese sources, has been followed rather than older sources.)

The Ise class were the only Japanese battleships to place the powder magazine above the shell magazine as the IJN wished to put as much space as possible between the highly flammable propellant and mine and torpedo detonations. The danger from plunging shells at long distances was not appreciated until the fatal magazine explosions of three British battlecruisers during the 1916 Battle of Jutland graphically demonstrated the point. To further protect the magazines the depth of the double bottom was increased to a total of 3.58 metres (11 ft 9 in) underneath the barbettes and magazines. Additionally, the vessels contained 660 watertight compartments to preserve buoyancy in the event of battle damage. In addition to the torpedo bulge added when the ships were modernized, the deck armour over the machinery and magazines was increased to a total thickness of 140 mm. Inside the original skin of the ships, two torpedo bulkheads were also added and the turret roofs were increased to a total of 152 millimetres (6 in) of armour.

=== Fire control and sensors ===
While the details of the ships' fire-control instruments are not fully available, it is known that the ships were fitted with a fire-control director after completion. No computer was fitted at that time and data from the rangefinders had to be processed manually. Turrets 2, 3, and 5 were built with imported 6-metre (19 ft 8 in) Bausch & Lomb rangefinders. These were felt to be inferior to the British Barr & Stroud instruments used on other ships and were removed in 1920. They were replaced by either the British rangefinders or domestically built instruments of 6 or 8 metres (19 ft 8 in or 26 ft 3 in) length. In the late 1920s the fire-control systems were upgraded and additional platforms were added to the foremast to accommodate them. A pair of directors for the 12.7 cm AA guns were added, one on each side of the forward superstructure, in the early 1930s. The fire-control systems were again upgraded in the mid-1930s and directors were added for the 25 mm AA guns. Both ships had 10-metre (32 ft 10 in) rangefinders installed at the top of the pagoda mast at that time. Type 21 air-search radars were installed aboard the sisters in mid-1942.

=== Aircraft ===
Ise was briefly fitted with an aircraft flying-off platform for a Mitsubishi 1MF3 fighter on Turret No. 2 in 1927. It was replaced by a platform on Turret No. 5 for a Yokosuka E1Y reconnaissance floatplane in 1928–1929. A catapult and a collapsible 4-tonne (3.9-long-ton) crane were fitted on the stern during the mid-1930s modernization, and the ships were equipped to operate three floatplanes, although no hangar was provided. The initial Nakajima E4N2 biplanes were replaced by Nakajima E8N2 biplanes in 1938.

== Conversion to hybrid carriers ==
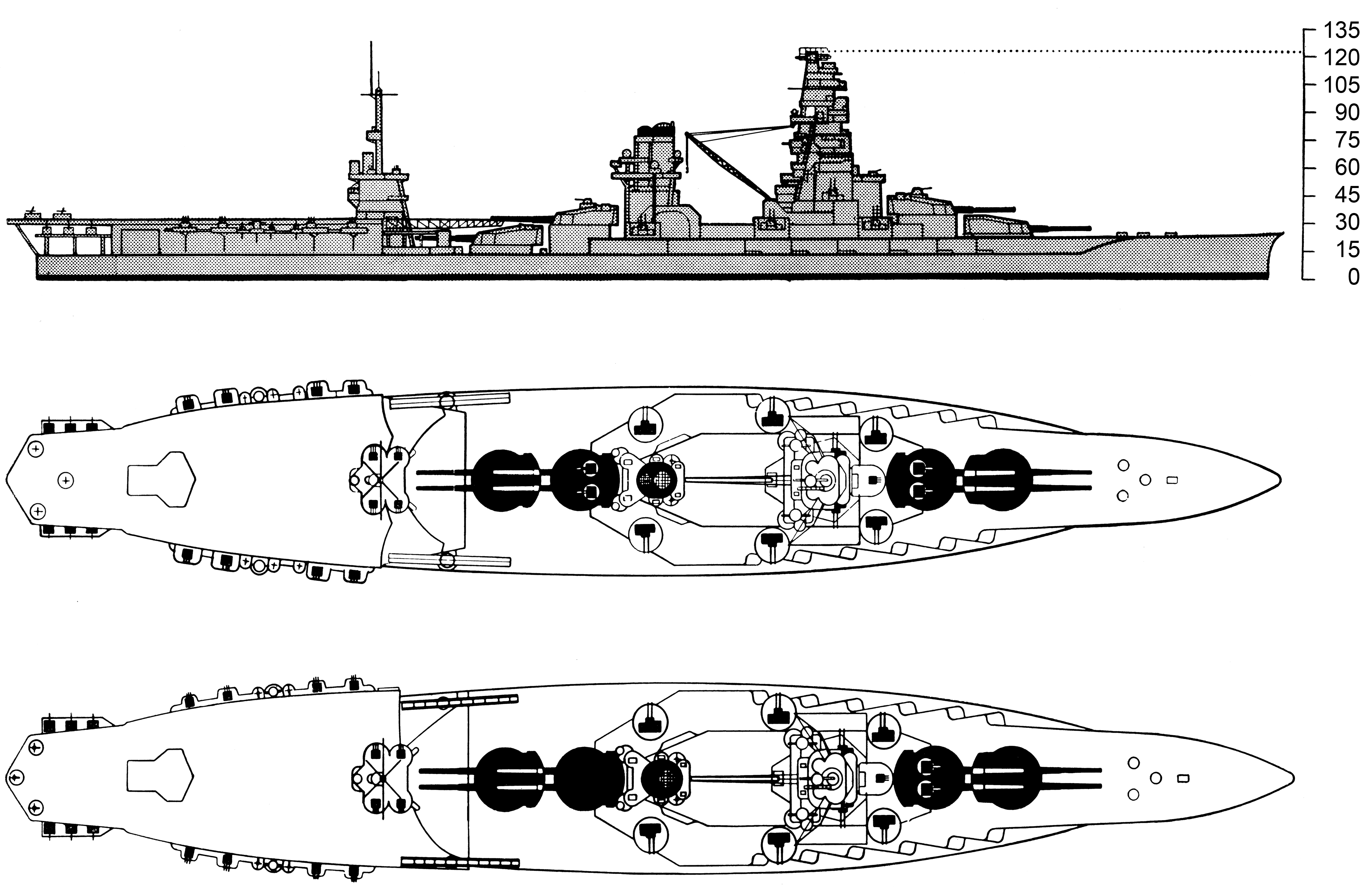
An American late-war drawing of the Ise class, showing variations in the reported configuration of the catapults

The sinking of the British capital ships Prince of Wales and Repulse by Japanese land-based aircraft on 10 December 1941 led the IJN to realize that battleships could not operate in the face of enemy aircraft and required friendly air support to protect them. The loss of four Japanese aircraft carriers during the Battle of Midway in June 1942 severely limited the ability of the IJN to provide any air cover and alternatives were sought. Earlier proposals to convert one or more battleships into carriers had been made and rejected at the beginning of the war, but they were revived after Midway. Plans for more elaborate conversions were rejected on the grounds of expense and - more critically - time, and the IJN settled on removing the rear pair of turrets and replacing them with a flight deck equipped with two catapults to launch floatplanes. The Ise-class ships were selected for the conversion because Hyūga had suffered an explosion in Turret No. 5 in early May that virtually destroyed the turret and Turret No. 6 could not elevate to the full +43 degrees deemed necessary for the long-range engagement anticipated by the IJN. The Fusōs were scheduled to follow once the first two were completed.

=== Armament changes ===
The rear turrets, the barbettes and their supporting structures were removed beginning in early 1943 and the openings in the middle deck were covered by 152 mm plates salvaged from the turret armour. All of the 14 cm guns were removed and the casemate openings sealed off. Four additional twin 12.7 cm mounts were added, one pair abreast the funnel and the other abreast the conning tower. The original ten twin 25 mm gun mounts were replaced by triple mounts and nine new triple mounts were added, a total of 57 guns. Two each Type 94 and Type 95 AA directors were added to control the additional guns. The ammunition for these new guns was stored in the magazines originally used for the 14 cm guns and for Turret No. 5. During 1944, the ships' AA defences were reinforced with an additional dozen triple and eleven single 25 mm gun mounts, for a total of 104 barrels, and a pair of Type 13 early warning radars were added. In September six 30-round AA rocket launchers were added on the sides of the flight deck.

=== Flight deck arrangements ===
A 70-metre-long (229 ft 8 in) flight deck was built above the stern and stretched forward to the rebuilt aft superstructure. The flight deck was 29 metres (95 ft 2 in) wide at its forward end and 13 metres (42 ft 8 in) at the stern. It overhung the stern and increased the overall length of the ships to 219.62 metres (720 ft 6 in). A pair of rotating gunpowder-propelled catapults were fitted on the sides of the hull, forward of the aft superstructure where they partially restricted the arc of fire of the two amidships turrets. They could launch aircraft up to 4,600 kilograms (10,100 lb) in weight and required 30 seconds to launch each aircraft. The flight deck had eight permanent storage positions connected by rails to the catapults and the hydraulically operated aircraft lift that brought the aircraft up from the hangar below on the trolleys used to move the floatplanes about. Two aircraft were intended to be stowed on the catapults and three more in temporary positions on the flight deck for a total of thirteen.

The 40-metre-long (131 ft 3 in) hangar was 20 metres (65 ft 7 in) wide forward and 11 metres (36 ft 1 in) at the rear. It was 6 metres (19 ft 8 in) high and designed to stow nine aircraft. It was fitted with fire fighting foam and carbon dioxide dispensers as a result of wartime experience. The T-shaped lift was 12.1 metres (39 ft 8 in) wide at its forward end and 6.6 metres (21 ft 8 in) wide at its aft end. It was also 12.1 metres long and had a capacity of 6 tonnes (5.9 long tons). Petrol storage tanks with a capacity of 76 tonnes (75 long tons) were installed in the former magazine of Turret No. 6 to provide each aircraft with enough fuel for three sorties. To recover the aircraft the collapsible crane formerly on the stern was moved up to the port side of the flight deck. Another crane was intended on the starboard side, but it was never fitted.

The ships had an air group of 11 each of Yokosuka D4Y dive bombers (Allied reporting name "Judy") and Aichi E16A reconnaissance aircraft (Allied reporting name "Paul"). Both aircraft had development problems and neither air group ever had all of its intended aircraft. Coupled with a shortage of trained pilots, neither ship ever used its aircraft during combat.

=== Other changes ===
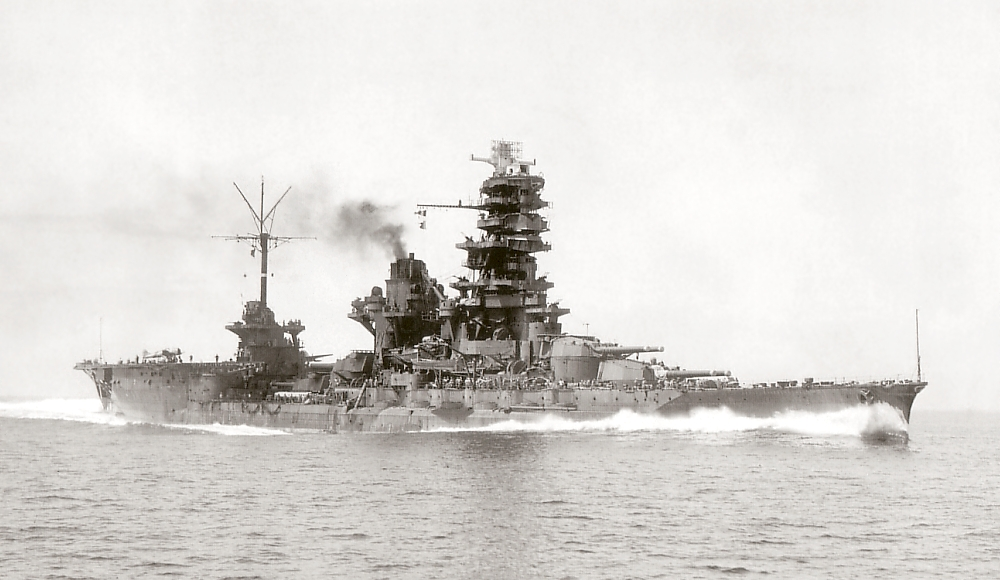
Ise running her sea trials on 23 August 1943

After the loss of the fast battleship Hiei at the Naval Battle of Guadalcanal in late 1942 to rudder damage, the IJN decided to reinforce the protection of the steering compartment and to create an auxiliary steering compartment. The protection of the former was strengthened by the addition of a concrete wall at least 1 metre (3 ft 3 in) in thickness and some of the armour removed from the turrets was used to protect the latter. The double bottom below the former positions of aft turrets was converted to hold fuel oil; this increased the ships' endurance to 9,500 nautical miles (17,600 km; 10,900 mi) at a speed of 16 knots. A pair of Type 22 surface-search radars were also fitted during the conversion.

The removal of the secondary armament, the rear turrets and their supporting structures was generally compensated by the addition of the flight deck, hangar, AA guns and more fuel, and the metacentric height increased 0.23 metres (9.1 in) to 2.81 metres (9 ft 3 in) at full load as a result of the reduction in the displacement by over 2,000 tonnes (2,000 long tons) to 40,444 tonnes (39,805 long tons). This also reduced the draught to 9.03 metres (29 ft 8 in). The overhang of the flight deck at the stern increased the overall length to 219.62 metres (720 ft 6 in) and the beam was slightly reduced to 31.71 metres (104 ft 0 in).

== Ships ==
Construction data
Ship	Kanji	Builder	Laid down	Launched	Completed	Fate
Ise	伊勢	Kawasaki, Kobe	10 May 1915	2 November 1916	15 December 1917	Scrapped in place, 9 October 1946 – 4 July 1947
Hyūga	日向	Mitsubishi, Nagasaki	6 May 1915	27 January 1917	30 April 1918	Scrapped, 2 July 1946 – 4 July 1947

== Service ==
Upon commissioning, the sister ships were assigned to the 1st Battleship Division of the 1st Fleet. Hyūga had an explosion in one of her main gun turrets that killed 11 men and injured 25 in 1919; the following year she accidentally collided with and sank a schooner, losing two crewmen. Before the start of the Pacific War, both ships frequently exercised off the coasts of the Soviet Union, Korea and China in addition to training in Japanese waters. Ise hosted Edward, Prince of Wales, and his aide-de-camp Lieutenant Louis Mountbatten in 1922 during the prince's visit to Japan. In Korea Bay when the 1923 Great Kantō earthquake struck, they sailed to Kyushu where they loaded supplies for the victims on 4 September. Together with two other battleships and a pair of light cruisers, Ise sank the destroyer Yayoi in 1926 during gunnery practice. Ise's AA armament was upgraded in 1931 and Hyūga's two years later. The latter ship was modernized in 1934–36 and Ise in 1935–37, both at Kure Naval Arsenal. During the Second Sino-Japanese War, the sisters frequently patrolled the Chinese coast in support of the blockade imposed by Japan. In August 1937 Hyūga ferried two battalions of Special Naval Landing Forces to Port Arthur. Three years later, she served as the flagship for the Emperor of the puppet state of Manchukuo, Henry Pu-yi, during his state visit to Japan in June 1940. On 15 November the ships were transferred to the 2nd Battleship Division of the 1st Fleet. The sisters were refitted in late 1940 in preparation for war, which included the fitting of external degaussing coils and additional AA directors.

=== World War II ===
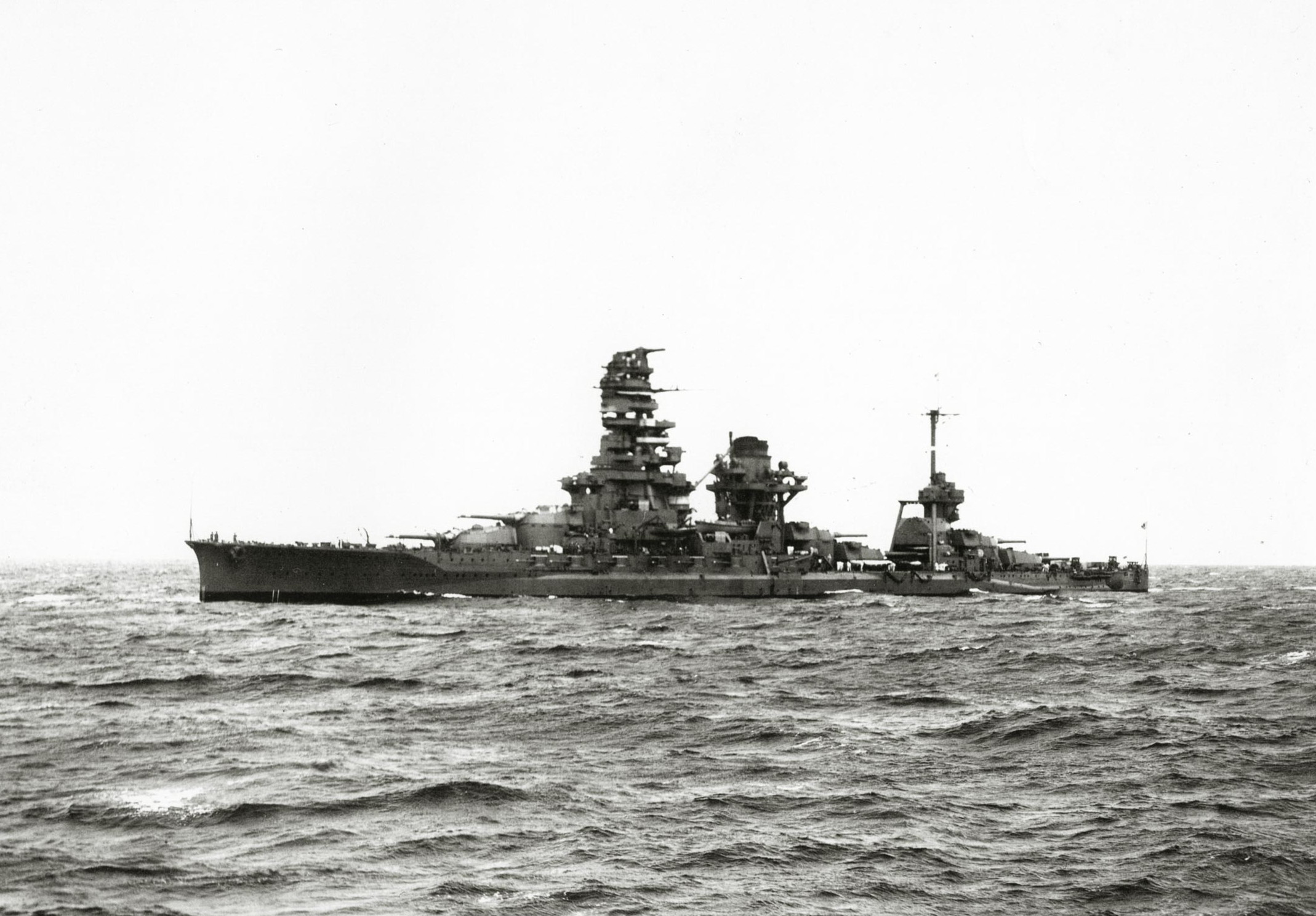
Ise underway after her modernization

When Japan began the Pacific War on 8 December, (Note: Japan Standard Time is 19 hours ahead of Hawaiian Standard Time, so in Japan, the attack on Pearl Harbor happened on 8 December.) the sisters sortied for the Bonin Islands with four other battleships and the light carrier Hōshō as distant cover for the fleet attacking Pearl Harbor, and returned six days later. On 11 March 1942 Ise and Hyūga sortied from their anchorage at Hashirajima to join the unsuccessful search for the American carrier force that had attacked Marcus Island a week earlier. Similarly they pursued but did not catch the American carriers that had launched the Doolittle Raid on 18 April.

During gunnery training on 5 May, there was a premature detonation in the left gun of Hyūga's Turret No. 5 that disabled both guns and killed 51 crewmen. Both aft magazines were flooded to douse the resulting fire and save the ship. She received temporary repairs during which the turret was removed and replaced by a circular armour plate on which three triple 25 mm gun mounts were positioned. On 11 May a valve in Ise's No. 2 engine room stuck in the open position and flooded the engine room. While under repair at Kure, both ships received prototype Type 21 radars. Commanded by Vice-Admiral Shirō Takasu, the 2nd Battleship Division set sail with the Aleutian Support Group on 28 May, at the same time that most of the Imperial Fleet began an attack on Midway Island (Operation MI).

They returned home on 14 June and the IJN began preliminary planning to replace the lost carriers with hybrid carriers converted from battleships. The sisters were selected for conversion and detached from the division on 14 July in preparation. They remained on "standby alert" until the actual conversions began. Ise was converted at Kure Naval Arsenal from 23 February to 5 September 1943 and Hyūga at Sasebo Naval Arsenal from 2 May to 30 November.

After completing her sea trials, Ise was attached to the Imperial Japanese Naval Academy at Etajima and ferried troops and munitions to the naval base at Truk in October. In November the ship began working up, joined by the newly completed Hyūga the following month, and both rejoined the 2nd Battleship Division. On 1 May 1944, the sisters were transferred to Rear Admiral Matsuda Chiaki's reformed Fourth Carrier Division of the 3rd Fleet. The division's 634th Naval Air Group was formed that same day and conducted its first catapult launches in late June.

==== Battle off Cape Engaño ====
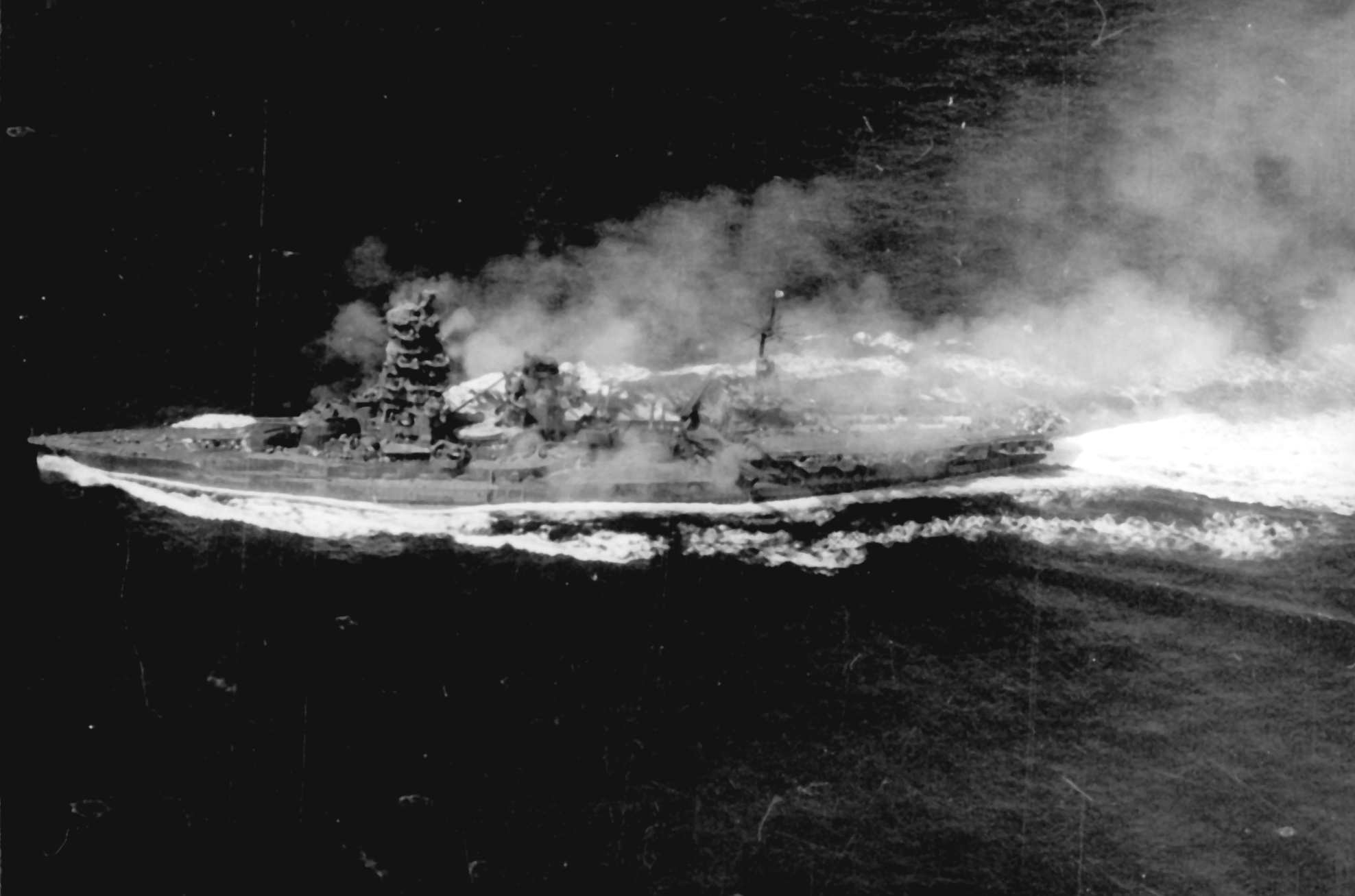
Ise photographed by American aircraft during the Battle off Cape Engaño

In October 1944, the two ships were involved in the Battle off Cape Engaño. Shortages of aircraft and serviceability problems greatly retarded pilot training and the ships only had a total of 17 D4Ys and 18 E16As on hand on 1 October; of these, only 6 and 16 were operational, respectively. The Japanese plan for the defence of the Philippines envisioned that the surviving carriers would be used to lure the American carrier forces away from the invasion area to a position where the carriers could be attacked by land-based aircraft, while the transports would be attacked by the rest of the IJN. The other carrier air groups were not in much better shape and the Japanese decided to retain the aircraft ashore for use against the American carriers. The Fourth Carrier Division, including the sisters, fleet carrier Zuikaku and the light carriers Zuihō, Chitose, and Chiyoda, was assigned to the Northern Force under the command of Vice Admiral Jisaburō Ozawa. The Ise-class sisters sailed from Yashima on 20 October. Ozawa's carrier group was a decoy force, divested of all but 108 aircraft, intended to lure the American fleet away from protecting the transports at the landing beaches. On the morning of 24 October, the group was facing a United States Navy force that included ten carriers containing 600–1,000 aircraft. Ozawa launched the bulk of his few aircraft to attack the American carriers as a distraction. They inflicted no damage and caused the Americans to search in the direction from which they had attacked. The Americans finally spotted the Japanese carriers at 16:40, some 200 miles (320 km) east of Cape Engaño, the northeastern tip of Luzon. The American carriers were spread out and it was very late in the day to launch an airstrike, so Admiral William Halsey, commander of the Third Fleet decided to mass his carriers in a position to attack the following morning. Ozawa reversed course during the night, correctly believing that the Americans would follow him north.

Although they had lost contact during the night, the Americans did find the Japanese carriers at 07:35. They had already launched an airstrike of 180 aircraft that was orbiting 50 miles (80 km) ahead of the American carriers while waiting for the Japanese ships to be located. This was just the first of a total of five airstrikes that the Americans launched that day. The sisters were not heavily engaged by the early airstrikes, which instead focused on Ozawa's fleet and light carriers, sinking carriers Zuikaku, Chitose and Zuihō, and the destroyer Akizuki, while the carrier Chiyoda and the cruiser Tama were crippled. Ise claimed to have shot down five attacking dive bombers from the second wave and one small bomb detonated on Turret No. 2. Hyūga was lightly damaged by near misses that ruptured some hull plating in her bulge and peppered her superstructure with splinters. She took on a 5-degree list that was quickly corrected before she was ordered to tow Chiyoda to safety. Her attempt was unsuccessful and Chiyoda had to be abandoned, eventually sunk by additional USN cruiser shellfire and destroyer-launched torpedoes.

Ise was attacked by 80-odd aircraft from the fourth wave, but they failed to inflict any serious damage. She dodged 11 torpedoes and was only hit by a bomb once, on the bulge outboard of the port catapult. Some 34 other bombs near missed her, spraying her with splinters and ruptured some hull plates that contaminated some fuel oil and caused leaks in her port boiler rooms. While an exact total of her casualties is not available, it has been estimated that 5 men were killed and some 111–121 crewmen were wounded during this attack. Hyūga was unsuccessfully attacked by an American submarine at 18:43. Around 19:00 Ozawa learned about a force of destroyers and cruisers that drove off the Japanese destroyers rescuing survivors from some of the carriers lost earlier in the day and sank Chiyoda. He ordered the Fourth Carrier Division to reverse course and engage the Americans, but the battleships were unable to find them, and Ozawa ordered them to reverse course and head for Amami Ōshima. When they arrived on 27 October, Ozawa transferred to Hyūga and hoisted his flag aboard her. While en route for Kure, the division was unsuccessfully attacked by another submarine.

=== Late war ===
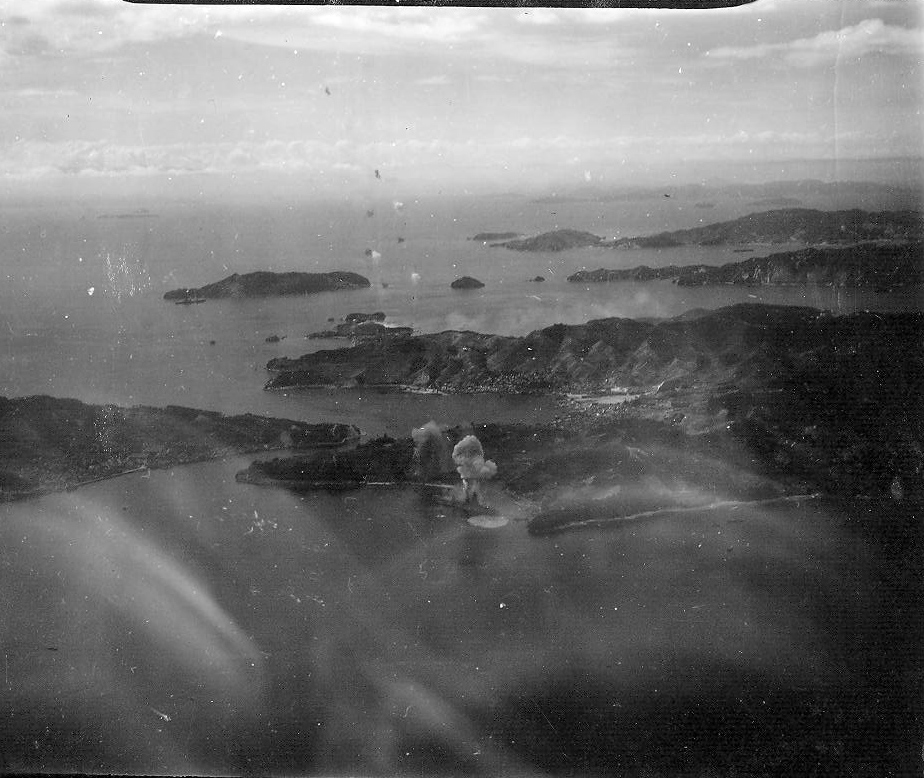
Ise on fire during the attack on 28 July

In early November the catapults were removed from both ships, and they loaded troops and munitions later that month. While en route they were diverted to the Spratly Islands upon reports of heavy air raids at Manila. After off-loading their cargo, they sailed for Lingga Island, near Singapore, on 20 November. They transferred to Cam Ranh Bay, French Indochina, and Hyūga became flagship of the 5th Fleet there on 14 December. The division sailed for Singapore on 30 December and Vice Admiral Kiyohide Shima transferred his flag to the light cruiser Ōyodo on arrival there the following day. The division continued onwards to Lingga. Its planned return to Japan was delayed by attacks by the American Third Fleet on targets in Indochina and southern China that sank two oil tankers that were intended to refuel the division.

The IJN then decided to use the sisters and their escorts to bring a load of petrol, rubber, tin and other strategic minerals back to Japan after the American carriers departed the South China Sea (Operation Kita). They loaded their cargoes beginning on 6 February at Singapore and departed four days later. Also carrying some 1,150 oilfield workers, they were escorted by Ōyodo and three destroyers. Decrypted Japanese radio signals revealed the Japanese plan to the Allies, and 15 submarines were positioned along their anticipated route in an attempt to intercept and sink the ships. An additional 11 were moved into position while the group was en route, but only three were ultimately able to attack. None of them were successful before the Japanese reached Kure on 20 February. The Fourth Carrier Division was disbanded on 1 March and the sisters were reduced to 1st rank reserve ships. On 19 March Kure was attacked by aircraft from Task Force 58 and Hyūga was hit three times by bombs that killed 37 men and wounded 52. Her gunners claimed to have shot down one American dive bomber during the attack. Ise was hit twice during the attack, but her casualties, if any, are unknown.

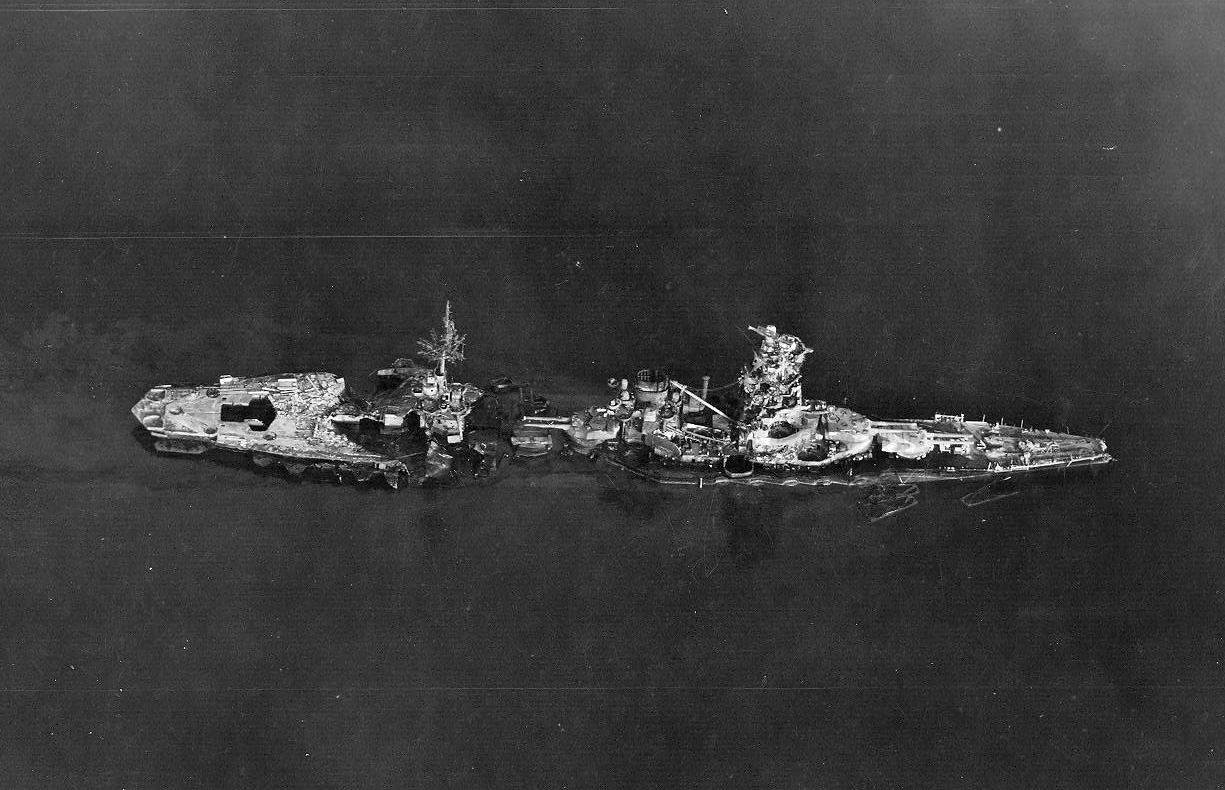
The wreck of Hyūga after the July attacks

The ships were turned into floating AA batteries over the next several months although it availed them little when they were attacked again by American carrier aircraft in July. On the 24th Ise was struck by five bombs and near missed multiple times; all told she lost 50 crewmen killed and many others wounded. The bombs started numerous leaks and Ise began to settle by the bow, although she was returned to an even keel after three days pumping. Hyūga was a primary focus of the attack and she received 10 direct hits and up to 30 near misses. She was badly damaged with some 200-odd crewmen killed and 600 wounded during the attack. She slowly foundered over the next two days and was not attacked when the Americans returned four days later. This time it was Ise's turn and she was struck 11 or more times with many near misses that put her on the bottom in shallow water with a 15 degree list. The sisters were struck off the Navy List in November and their wrecks were scrapped after the war.
