= Japanese torpedo boat Hayabusa =

Two Japanese warships have borne the name Hayabusa:

- Japanese torpedo boat Hayabusa (1898), a Hayabusa-class torpedo boat launched in 1898 and stricken in 1921
- Japanese torpedo boat Hayabusa (1935), an Ōtori-class torpedo boat launched in 1935 and sunk in 1944
