= Japanese torpedo boat Manazuru =

Two Japanese warships have borne the name Manazuru:

- Japanese torpedo boat Manazuru (1899), a Hayabusa-class torpedo boat launched in 1899 and stricken in 1921
- Japanese torpedo boat Manazuru (1933), a Chidori-class torpedo boat launched in 1933 and sunk in 1945
