= Japanese torpedo boat Chidori =

Two Japanese warships have borne the name Chidori:

- Japanese torpedo boat Chidori (1900), a Hayabusa-class torpedo boat launched in 1900 and stricken in 1921
- Japanese torpedo boat Chidori (1933), a Chidori-class torpedo boat launched in 1933 and sunk in 1944
