= Japanese battleship Settsu =

Imperial Japanese Navy's Kawachi-class battleship

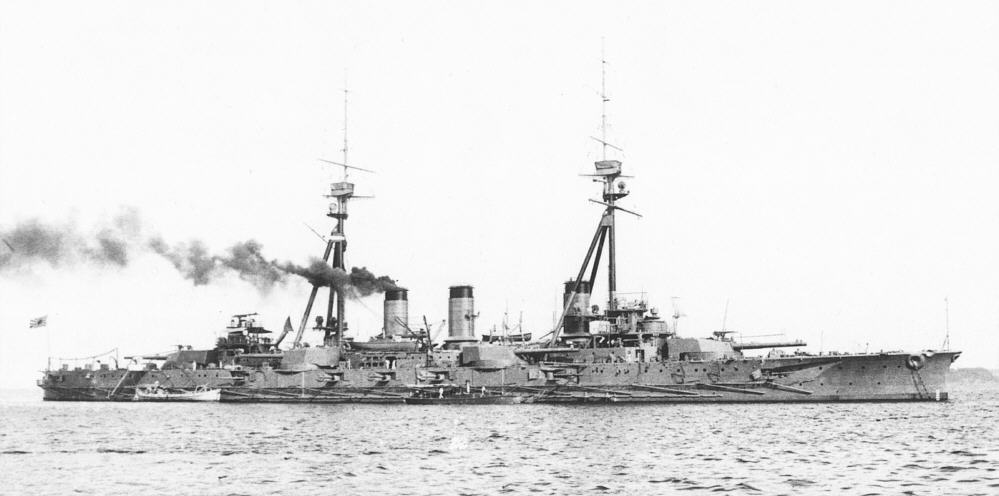
- Settsu at anchor

History

Japan
- Name: Settsu
- Namesake: Settsu Province
- Ordered: 22 June 1907
- Builder: Kure Naval Arsenal
- Laid down: 18 January 1909
- Launched: 30 March 1911
- Completed: 1 July 1912
- Recommissioned: 1924
- Reclassified: Converted to target ship, 1924
- Stricken: 1 October 1923; 20 November 1945
- Fate: Scrapped, 1946–1947

General characteristics
- Class & type: Kawachi-class battleship
- Displacement: 21,443 long tons (21,787 t) (normal)
- Length: 533 ft (162.5 m)
- Beam: 84 ft 2 in (25.7 m)
- Draft: 27 ft 10 in (8.5 m)
- Installed power: 16 Miyabara water-tube boilers; 25,000 shp (19,000 kW)
- Propulsion: 2 shafts, 2 steam turbine sets
- Speed: 21 knots (39 km/h; 24 mph)
- Range: 2,700 nmi (5,000 km; 3,100 mi) at 18 knots (33 km/h; 21 mph)
- Complement: 999–1100
- Armament: 2 × twin 12 in (305 mm)/50 guns; 4 × twin 12-inch/45 guns; 10 × single 6 in (152 mm) guns; 8 × single 4.7 in (120 mm) guns; 12 × single 12 pdr 3 in (76 mm) guns; 5 × 18-inch (457 mm) torpedo tubes
- Armor: Waterline belt: 5–12 in (127–305 mm); Deck: 1.2 in (30 mm); Gun turrets: 11 in (279 mm); Conning tower: 10 in (254 mm); Barbettes: 11 in (279 mm)

Settsu (Japanese: 摂津; named after Settsu Province) was the second and last of the Kawachi-class dreadnought battleships built for the Imperial Japanese Navy (IJN) in the first decade of the 20th century. During World War I she bombarded German fortifications at Qingdao during the siege of Qingdao in 1914, but saw no other combat. She was placed in reserve in 1919 and was disarmed in 1922 in accordance with the terms of the Washington Naval Treaty.

Two years later, Settsu was converted into a target ship and she played a minor role at the beginning of the Second Sino-Japanese War in 1937. At the beginning of the Pacific War in 1941, the ship was used in an attempt to deceive the Allies as to the locations and activities of the Japanese aircraft carriers. Settsu reverted to her normal role as a target ship for the rest of the war; she was badly damaged when Allied aircraft carriers struck the naval base at Kure Naval District in July 1945. The ship was refloated after the war and scrapped in 1946–1947.

== Background ==
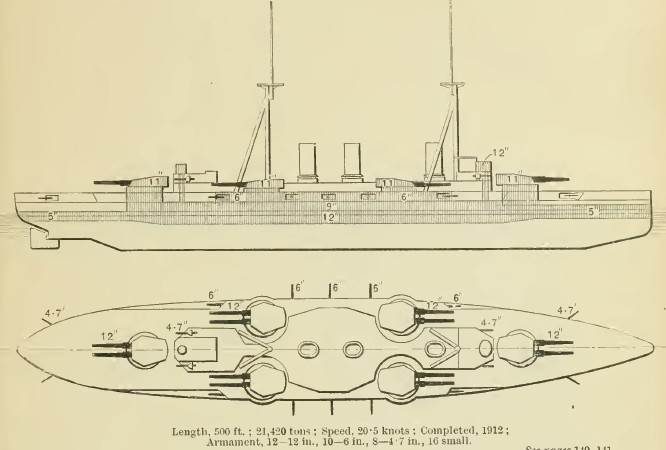
Right elevation and plan of the Kawachi-class battleships from Brassey's Naval Annual 1915

The Kawachi-class was ordered on 22 June 1907 under the 1907 Warship Supplement Program after the Russo-Japanese War as Japan's first dreadnoughts, although their construction was delayed by a severe depression. Their design was based on the Aki with a uniform 12-inch (305 mm) main-gun armament, although cost considerations prevented all the guns from having the same barrel length.

== Design and description ==
Unlike her sister ship, Kawachi, Settsu had a clipper bow that made her 7 feet (2.1 m) longer than her sister. The ship had an overall length of 533 feet (162.5 m), a beam of 84 feet 2 inches (25.7 m), and a normal draft of 27 feet 10 inches (8.5 m). She displaced 21,443 long tons (21,787 t) at normal load. Her crew ranged from 999 to 1100 officers and enlisted men. Settsu was fitted with a pair of license-built Curtis steam turbine sets, each set driving one propeller, using steam from 16 Miyabara water-tube boilers. The turbines were rated at a total of 25,000 shaft horsepower (19,000 kW) for a design speed of 21 knots (39 km/h; 24 mph). She carried enough coal and fuel oil to give her a range of 2,700 nautical miles (5,000 km; 3,100 mi) at a speed of 18 knots (33 km/h; 21 mph).

Settsu's main armament consisted of four 50-caliber 12-inch 41st Year Type guns in two twin-gun turrets, one each fore and aft of the superstructure, and eight 45-caliber 12-inch 41st Year Type guns mounted in four twin-gun turrets, two on each side of the superstructure. Settsu's secondary armament was ten 45-caliber 6-inch/45 guns, mounted in casemates in the sides of the hull, and eight 40-caliber quick-firing (QF) 4.7-inch 41st Year Type guns. The ship was also equipped with a dozen 40-caliber 3-inch 4th Year Type guns and four others were used as saluting guns. In addition, the battleship was fitted with five submerged 18-inch (457 mm) torpedo tubes, two on each broadside and one in the stern.

The waterline main belt of the ship had a maximum thickness of 12 inches amidships. It tapered to a thickness of 5 inches (127 mm) at the ends of the ship. A 6-inch (152 mm) strake of armor protected the casemates. The barbettes for the main guns were 9–11 inches (229–279 mm) thick. The armor of Settsu's main gun turrets had a maximum thickness of 11 inches. The deck armor was 1.1 inches (29 mm) thick and the conning tower was protected by 6 to 10 inches of armor.

== Construction and career ==
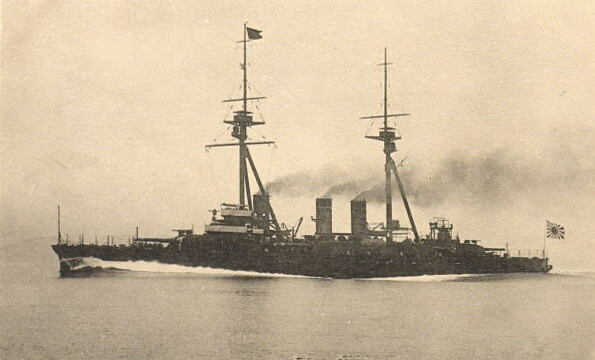
A postcard of Settsu at speed

Settsu was laid down at Kure Naval Arsenal on 18 January 1909. She was launched on 30 March 1911 and completed on 1 July 1912 at a cost of ¥11,010,000. Following the Japanese ship-naming conventions, Settsu was named after Settsu Province, now a part of Osaka Prefecture. Captain Morihide Tanaka assumed command on 1 December and the ship was assigned to the First Squadron. She spent most of the following year training and patrolling off the coast of China. When World War I began in August 1914, Settsu was at Kure. Together with her sister Kawachi, she bombarded German fortifications in October–November 1914 during the final stage of the siege of Qingdao. Settsu was assigned to the First Squadron until 1 December 1916 when she was placed in reserve for a refit at Kure. Upon its completion on 1 December 1917, the ship was assigned to the Second Squadron until 23 July 1918 when she rejoined the First Squadron. By this time, all 12 of the 3-inch 4th Year Type guns were removed and four 3-inch 4th Year Type anti-aircraft guns were added. Two of the torpedo tubes were also removed. On 28 October 1918, Settsu was the flagship for Emperor Taishō for the naval review held off Yokohama as well as the review held on 9 July 1919.

Settsu was placed in reserve on 6 November 1919 and reboilered during an overhaul that lasted from 1 April 1920 to 21 August 1921. While transporting Empress Teimei back to Tokyo after she toured several shrines where she prayed for the health of her husband, the ship was caught in a typhoon that forced her escorting destroyer, Warabi, ashore, but did not damage the battleship. She was disarmed in Kure in 1922 under the terms of the Washington Naval Treaty (Note: Originally Japan was going to be able to retain Settsu intact, but she was given up so that the IJN could keep the brand-new battleship Mutsu.) and stricken from the navy list on 1 October 1923. Her guns were turned over to the Imperial Japanese Army for use as coastal artillery; two of her main gun turrets were installed on Tsushima Island, one each in 1929 and 1936. The rest of her guns were placed in reserve and scrapped in 1943. In 1924, she was converted into a target ship with the removal of one boiler room and her center funnel. Her armor was reinforced to be able to absorb hits from 203-millimeter (8 in) shells and 30-kilogram (66 lb) practice bombs. These changes reduced her maximum speed to 16 knots (30 km/h; 18 mph) and her displacement to 16,130 long tons (16,390 t). In early February 1925, Settsu towed the incomplete hulk of the battleship Tosa, which had been used for gunnery and torpedo damage experiments, from Kure to the Bungo Channel where it was scuttled on 8 February.

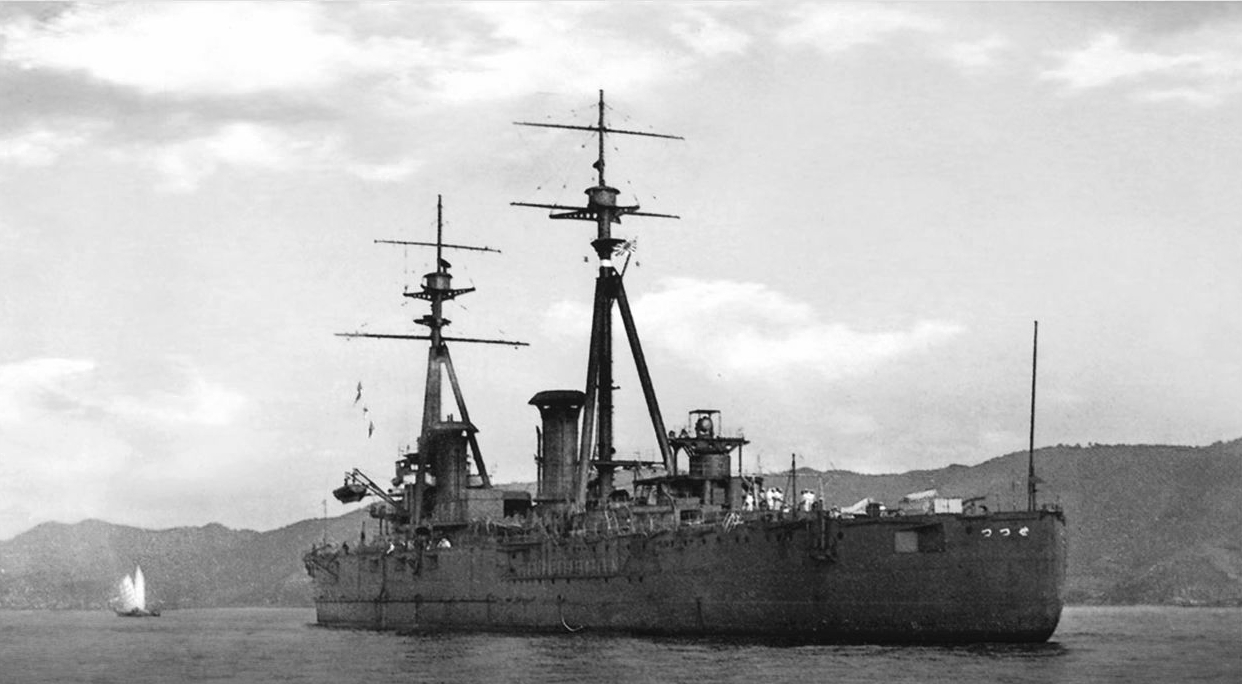
Settsu at Sukumo Bay as a radio-controlled target ship, 4 May 1939

Between October 1935 and 1937, Settsu was converted to radio-control which allowed her to be maneuvered by operators aboard the destroyer Yakaze. Armor on the deck, funnels, and bridge was added to strengthen her ability to survive hits.

In late August 1937, Settsu, under the command of Captain Naomasa Sakonju, transported a battalion of the Sasebo 4th Special Naval Landing Force to the Shanghai area in the early stages of the Second Sino-Japanese War. The troops were transferred offshore to the light cruiser Natori and the Yakaze for transportation up the Yangtze River. During 1940, the ship was modified to make it suitable to train carrier pilots, and was used extensively by bomber pilots practicing for the attack on Pearl Harbor. She participated in the fleet review by Emperor Hirohito on 11 October 1940 in Tokyo Bay.

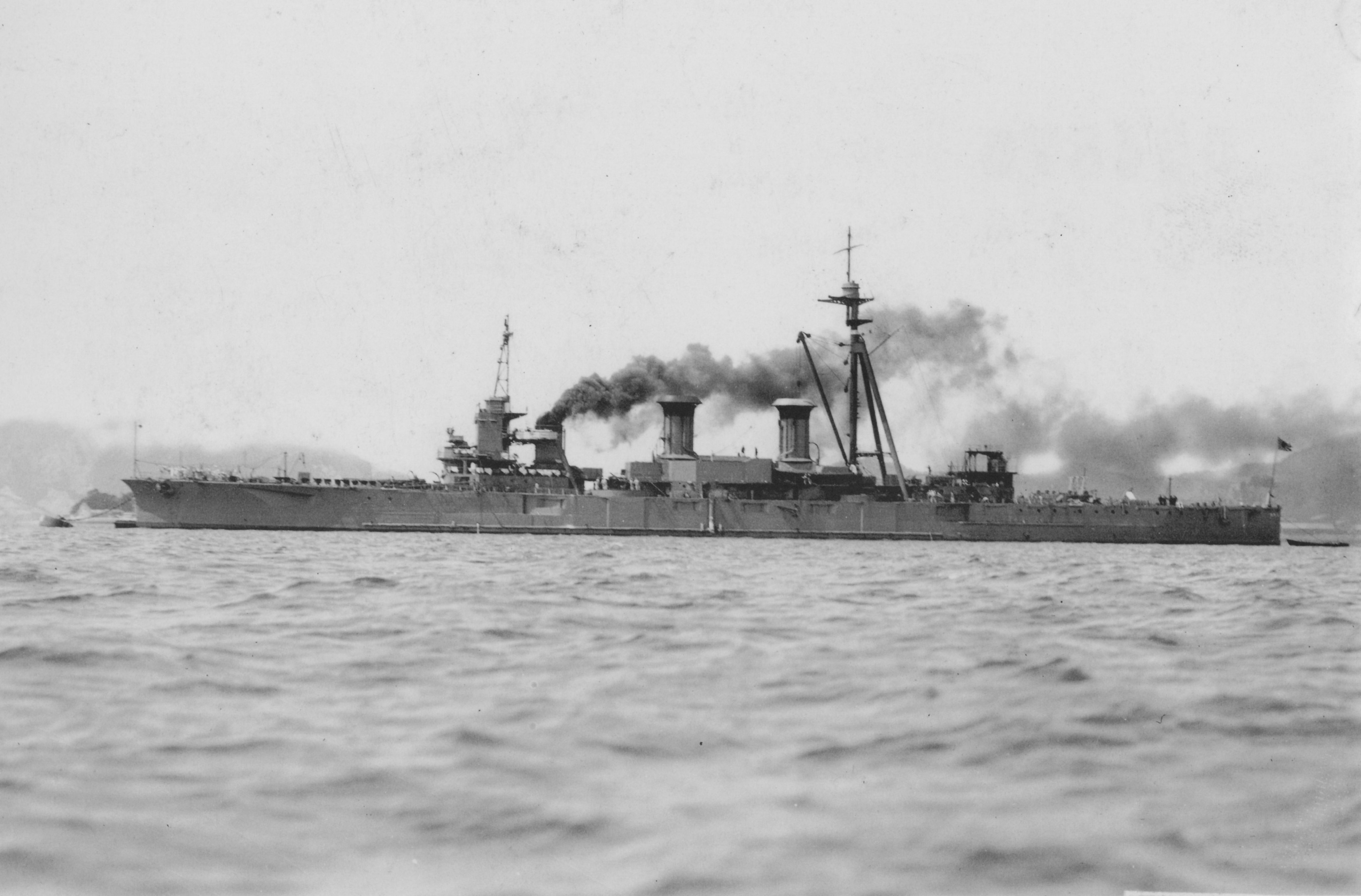
Settsu after her 1940 modification, Kure, 7 April 1940

At the beginning of the Pacific War, Settsu, under the command of Captain Chiaki Matsuda sailed from Taiwan to the vicinity of the Philippines and simulated the radio traffic of all six aircraft carriers of the 1st Air Fleet as well as the light carriers Zuihō and Ryūjō in an effort to deceive Allied intelligence as to the locations and activities of the Japanese carriers. For most of the rest of the war, she was stationed in the Inland Sea and used for bomb and torpedo training. In March–June 1944, she served as a target for the 522nd and 762nd Naval Air Groups. During this time, she was fitted with a number of license-built Hotchkiss 25 mm Type 96 light AA guns, depth charges and a hydrophone.

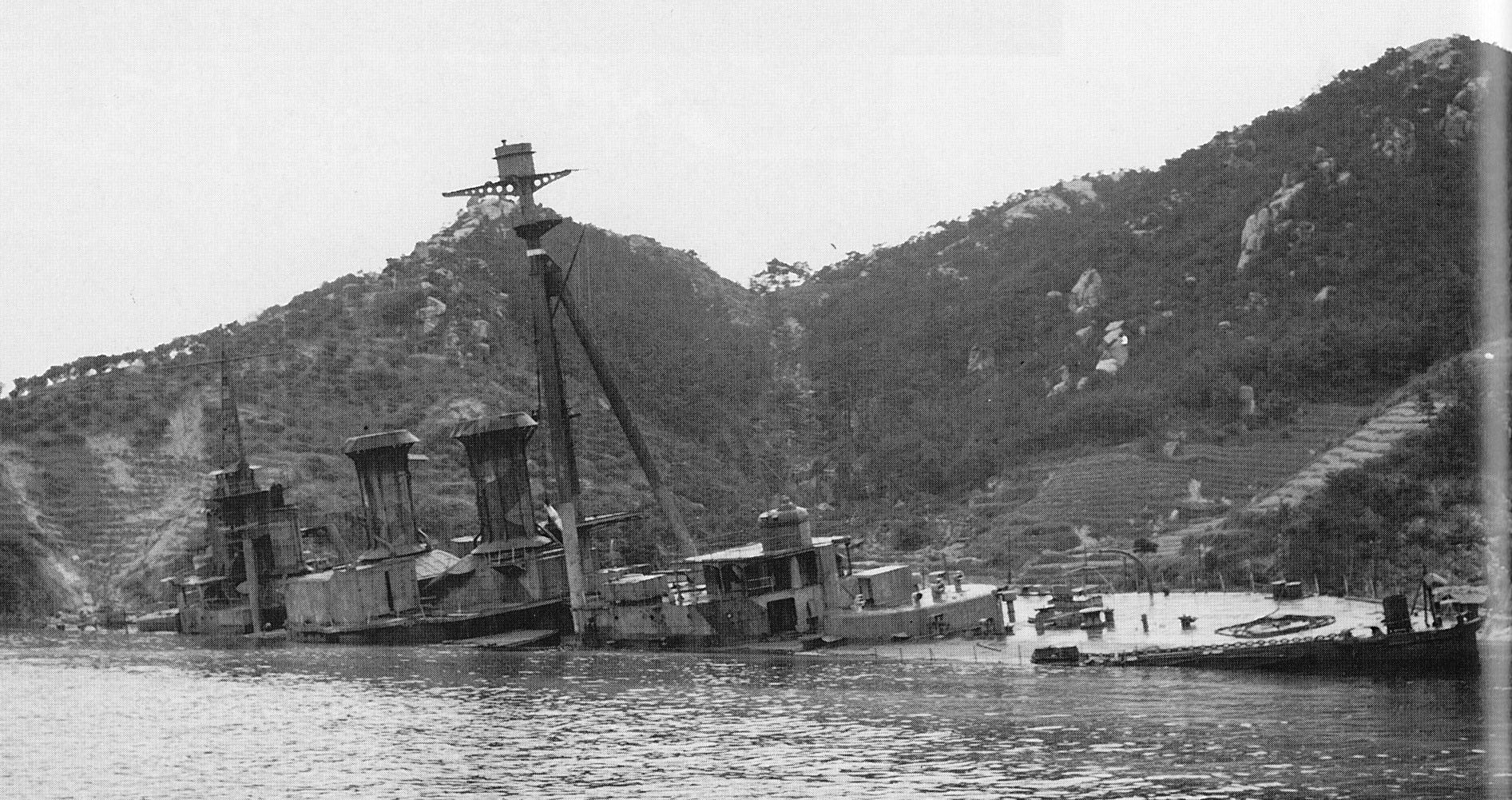
Settsu sunk at Etajima, October 1945

During the U.S. Navy carrier air attack on Kure on 24 July 1945, Settsu was attacked by 30 Grumman F6F Hellcat fighters near Etajima. She was struck by one bomb that killed two men and wounded another two; five near misses started a serious leak in the starboard engine room. Captain Masanano Ofuji decided to run his ship aground on Etajima to prevent her from sinking. All of Settsu's 25 mm guns were subsequently removed and the ship was used as a floating barracks. Four days later, the ship was again attacked by carrier aircraft that hit her twice more with bombs. She was abandoned the next day. Settsu was stricken from the navy list on 20 November and her hulk was raised in June 1946 and towed to Kure where scrapping was completed in August 1947.
