= Chiaki Matsuda =

Imperial Japanese Navy rear admiral (1896–1995)

- 松田 千秋
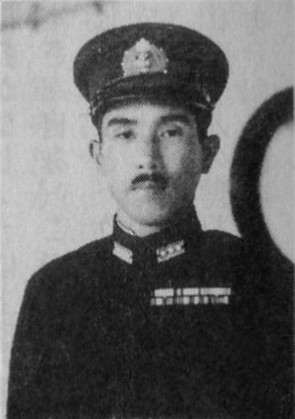
- Born: 29 September 1896; Kamoto, Kumamoto, Japan
- Died: 6 November 1995 (aged 99); Japan
- Education: Imperial Japanese Naval Academy; Navy Torpedo School; Navy Gunnery School; Naval War College
- Military career
- Allegiance: Empire of Japan
- Branch: Imperial Japanese Navy
- Service years: 1916–1945
- Rank: Rear admiral
- Units: Tokiwa, Haruna, Kawachi, Azuma, Yūdachi, Kongō, Kamikaze, Mutsu, Kiso, Abukuma, Imperial General Headquarters
- Commands: Kamoi, Settsu, Hyūga, Yamato, 4th Carrier Division, Yokosuka Naval Air Group
- Conflicts: World War I; Second Sino-Japanese War; World War II; Operation Kita
- Awards: Order of the Golden Kite; Order of the Rising Sun
- Other work: Military attaché, inventor, businessman

Chiaki Matsuda (松田 千秋, Matsuda Chiaki; 29 September 1896 – 6 November 1995) was a rear admiral in the Imperial Japanese Navy and the third captain of the Yamato during World War II.

== Early life and career ==
Matsuda was born in Kamoto, now part of the city of Yamaga. He entered the Imperial Japanese Naval Academy in September 1913 and graduated as a midshipman, ranking 14th out of 95 cadets, on 22 November 1916 while on a training cruise aboard the cruiser Tokiwa. The cruise began at Sasebo and took him to the ports of Osaka, Shimizu, Maizuru, Incheon, Zhenhai, Dalian, Lushun, Weihaiwei and Qingdao. He returned to Japan on 3 March 1917, resuming his training on 5 April with another cruise in the South Seas which took him to Vancouver, San Francisco, Keelung, Hong Kong (San Pedro), Honolulu, Palau, Yap and Angaur. He returned to Japan on 17 August and joined the crew of the Haruna two days later. He was commissioned as an ensign on 1 December and joined the battleship Kawachi. After Kawachi sank in a magazine explosion on 12 July 1918, he rejoined the Haruna on 15 August before joining the cruiser Azuma as a supplementary guidance officer on 9 November.

After a cruise in March 1919, taking him to Manila, Hong Kong and Singapore, Matsuda returned to Japan on 20 July. He was promoted to sub-lieutenant on 1 December and assigned to the Navy Torpedo School. He entered the Navy Gunnery School on 31 May 1920 and joined the destroyer Yūdachi on 1 December. He was appointed squadron strategy officer on the battleship Kongō on 1 December 1921. Promoted to lieutenant the following 1 December, he entered the 22nd graduate-level class at the Navy Gunnery School on the same day, graduating with honours on 29 November 1923 and assigned to the brand-new destroyer Kamikaze as chief gunnery officer. He was assigned as squad leader on the battleship Mutsu on 1 December 1924, and as an instructor at the Navy Gunnery School the following 1 December.

On 1 December 1926, Matsuda joined the 26th class of the Naval War College, from which he graduated on 6 November 1928, ranking 12th out of 22 students. He was promoted to lieutenant-commander on 10 December and assigned to the Bureau of Personnel in the Ministry of the Navy. Studying English at the American Language School, he was posted as an additional military attaché and aide at the U.S. embassy in May 1930. The following May, Matsuda was assigned to the Kiso as gunnery chief and was assigned to the first division of the Naval General Staff on 7 September. Promoted to commander on 15 November 1933, he was appointed to the Imperial Army General Staff on 2 April 1934 as a naval liaison officer, and was assigned to the second division of the Naval General Staff on 15 November.

== Wartime career ==
During this time, Matsuda was involved in developing the basic design of the Yamato-class battleships. In 1935, he was appointed the executive officer of the light cruiser Abukuma, stationed off China. On 21 November, he was appointed a faculty member at the Naval War College, and was promoted to captain on 1 December. Viewed as among the naval officers sympathetic towards the mutineers in the 26 February incident, the secret police put his name on a list of officers to be placed under surveillance in the wake of the failed coup.

Matsuda aboard the Izumo, 1938

On 25 August 1938, he was given command of the seaplane carrier Kamoi, and rose to the rank of a section chief at the Naval General Staff headquarters by 1940. After travels to Europe and North America in 1940, Matsuda became a staff member at the Institute for Total War on 1 October. He was given command of the target ship Settsu on 1 September 1941, developing a manual to prevent air attacks during his time as captain. He was critical of Admiral Yamamoto's attack on Pearl Harbor that December, believing it to have been ultimately unsuccessful.

On 20 February 1942, Matsuda was given command of the battleship Hyūga, and was given command of the Yamato on 17 December. He was promoted to rear admiral on 1 May 1943 and relinquished his command on 7 September, following his appointment as a senior staff officer at Imperial General Headquarters, with the role of chief staff officer of the first division of the Naval General Staff. He was appointed squadron commander of naval aviation on 1 May 1944.

On 23 June 1943, his nephew, Ensign Hirokazu Matsuda, was killed In Action aboard the submarine I-7.

== Operation Kita ==
In November, Matsuda commanded the Fourth Carrier Division, comprising the Hyūga and the battleship Ise, and sailed them to Singapore to reinforce the remaining naval elements in the Southwest Pacific. In early February, the two ships and their escorts received orders to return to Japan with much-needed supplies of oil, fuel and minerals. Despite American foreknowledge of the mission and several attempts to sink the ships with submarine and air attacks, all the vessels in the force returned to Japan with their valuable cargoes. This was one of the last Japanese victories of the war; subsequent efforts to transport supplies to Japan met with failure.

== Postwar ==
In March 1945, Matsuda was appointed commander of the Yokosuka Naval Air Group, a position he held at the time of Japan's surrender. Following the surrender, he entered the reserves on 1 November. He was interrogated by U.S. Navy officers, who found him a "cooperative and agreeable witness, and his testimony was considered generally accurate, although there was perhaps some effort at self justification in the account of the movements of Ise and Hyuga on the night of 24–25 October." Matsuda was critical about the effectiveness of Ise and Hyuga as converted carriers, and also criticised Imperial Navy policy of sending all front-line pilots into combat until all were killed; it would have been better if they had been rotated and some sent to train novice pilots.

After the war, he made a new career as a businessman, coming up with over a hundred patents for various inventions.

Matsuda died on 6 November 1995, aged 99. At the time of his death, he was the last surviving rear admiral of the Imperial Japanese Navy.
