= Operation Kita =

1945 Japanese military operation in World War II

- Part of the Pacific War
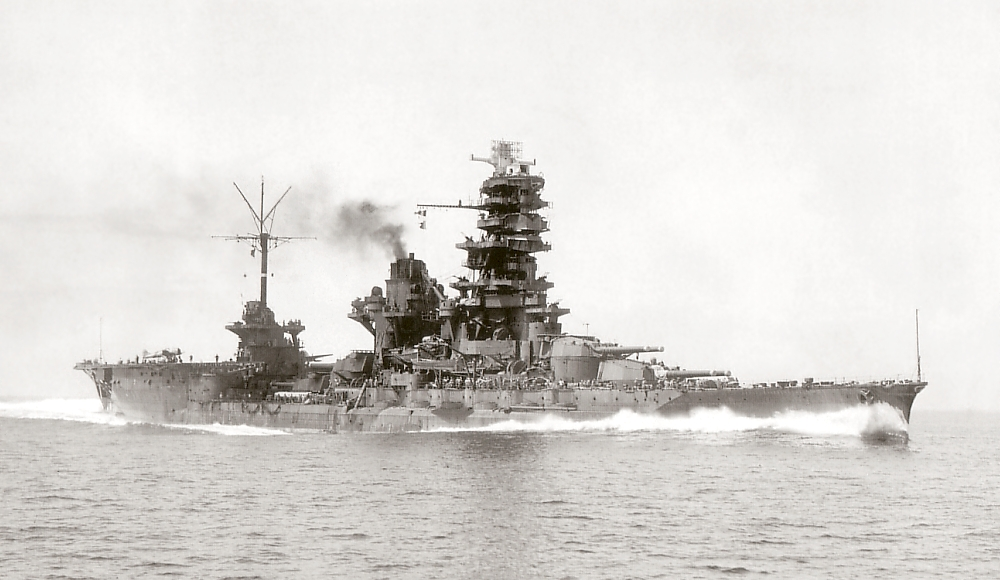
- Ise in 1943
Date	10–20 February 1945
Location	Waters between Singapore and Japan
Result	Japanese victory

Belligerents
Japan	United States; United Kingdom; Australia

Commanders and leaders
Matsuda Chiaki	James Fife Jr.; Charles A. Lockwood

Strength
3 destroyers; 2 battleship-aircraft carrier hybrids; 1 light cruiser; 52 aircraft	88+ aircraft; 26 submarines; 2 destroyers

Casualties and losses
Several aircraft	None

Operation Kita (北号作戦, Hoku-gō sakusen; "North") was conducted by the Imperial Japanese Navy (IJN) during the Pacific War in February 1945. Its purpose was to return two Ise-class hybrid battleship-aircraft carriers and four escort ships to Japan from Singapore, where they had been based since November the previous year. The movement of the Japanese force was detected by the Allies, but all attempts to attack it with submarines and aircraft failed. Nevertheless, as a result of the intensifying Allied blockade of Japan, the Ise-class battleship-carriers and their escorts were among the last IJN warships to safely reach the country from the Southwest Pacific before the end of the war. The operation is referred to as Operation Hoku in Japanese sources.

Before departing Singapore, the Japanese ships, which were designated the Completion Force, were loaded with supplies of oil and other important raw materials. This formed part of an effort to run increased quantities of supplies through the Allied blockade of Japan before the country was cut off from its empire. The Allies had learned of the Completion Force's composition and goals through intelligence gained from decrypting Japanese radio signals, and plans were developed for coordinated attacks on it by submarines and United States Army Air Forces (USAAF) aircraft. As part of these preparations, 26 submarines were eventually positioned along the ships' expected route.

The Completion Force sailed on 10 February 1945 and was sighted leaving port by a Royal Navy submarine. However, attempts by it and several United States Navy submarines to attack between 11 and 14 February were unsuccessful. More than 88 USAAF aircraft attempted to bomb the Completion Force on 13 and 14 February, but were unable to do so because of bad weather. A further submarine attack on 16 February did not damage any of the Japanese ships. As a result, the Completion Force reached its destination of Kure in Japan on 20 February without having suffered any casualties. Despite this success, the Japanese Government was forced to discontinue its efforts to ship oil from Southeast Asia to Japan in March due to the heavy losses Allied submarines were inflicting on oil tankers, and all the ships of the Completion Force were sunk in or near Japanese home waters before the end of the war.

== Background ==
During 1944, Allied submarine attacks effectively cut off the supply of oil from Southeast Asia to Japan and greatly reduced Japanese imports of other commodities. By this stage of the war, the oil reserves in Japan had been largely depleted. U.S. Navy submarines sank many Japanese warships during 1944, including the battleship Kongō, seven aircraft carriers, two heavy and seven light cruisers. In early 1945, the Japanese Government assessed that all convoy routes from the south would eventually be cut, and attempted to supplement the supplies of oil brought in by tankers by loading drums of oil on freighters. Several IJN aircraft carriers were also used to transport drums of oil from Singapore to Japan.

On 11 November 1944, the two Ise-class hybrid battleship-aircraft carriers—Ise and Hyūga, which were grouped as Carrier Division 4 and under the command of Rear Admiral Matsuda Chiaki—sailed from the Japanese home islands to join the main body of the IJN in the Southwest Pacific. (Note: The two Ise-class battleships were fitted with a flight deck and hangar during major modifications which took place between 1942 and 1944. While they were each capable of carrying 22 floatplanes as hybrid battleship-aircraft carriers, due to a shortage of pilots they never operated as carriers.) This deployment was made to both reinforce the remaining elements of the IJN in the area and place the ships near a source of fuel. During their voyage from Japan, each of the battleship-carriers was loaded with about 1,000 short tons (910 t) of munitions for the units defending Manila in the Philippines.

Due to heavy Allied air attacks on Manila, the two warships unloaded their supplies in the Spratly Islands from 14 November. They sailed for Lingga Roads near Singapore on the 20th of the month and arrived there two days later. The Allies learned from intelligence gained by decrypting Japanese radio signals that the battleship-carriers had sailed. Allied submarines were ordered to keep watch for the ships, but did not intercept Ise or Hyūga during their voyage to Singapore. The two battleship-carriers were deployed to Cam Ranh Bay in Indochina during December and returned to Singapore on 11 January 1945. The U.S. Third Fleet conducted a raid in the South China Sea between 10 and 20 January in search of the Japanese fleet, but did not locate Ise or Hyūga.

== Preparations ==
In early February 1945, Ise, Hyūga and an escort of smaller warships received orders to sail to Japan in what was designated Operation Kita. The goal of this operation was to return some of the IJN warships in the Southwest Pacific to Japan loaded with important supplies. The ships selected to accompany the battleship-carriers were the light cruiser Ōyodo (which became part of Carrier Division 4 from 10 February) and destroyers Asashimo, Hatsushimo and Kasumi. Carrier Division 4 and its escorts was designated the Completion Force (完部隊 Kan-butai).

The ships of the Completion Force departed the Lingga Roads on 6 February and began loading their cargoes in Singapore the next day. Shortly before docking, Ise sustained a small amount of damage when she struck a mine which had been dropped by Allied aircraft. During the Completion Force's period at Singapore all six ships were loaded with supplies and Ise received temporary repairs. Hyūga embarked 4,944 drums of aviation gasoline as well as 326 drums of standard gasoline and 440 oil field workers. Ise was loaded with 5,200 drums of aviation gasoline and 551 oil workers; each of the battleship-carriers also embarked 1,750 short tons (1,590 t) of rubber, 1,750 short tons of tin and 200 short tons (180 t) of other metals. Ōyodo was loaded with 120 short tons (110 t) of tin, 70 short tons (64 t) of tungsten, 70 tons of aviation gasoline, 50 short tons (45 t) of rubber, 40 short tons (36 t) of zinc and 20 short tons (18 t) of mercury. A further 140 short tons (130 t) of rubber and tin was split among the three destroyers.

Through code breaking, Allied intelligence was aware of the Completion Force's composition and objectives. Allied signals intelligence units carefully monitored radio transmissions in the Singapore region, and the resulting "Ultra" intelligence provided details of the two battleship-carriers' movements to Singapore, preparations to return to Japan and planned route. The commander of Allied submarines in the South-West Pacific Area (Task Force 71), Rear Admiral James Fife, Jr., placed a high priority on stopping Ise and Hyūga from reaching Japan, and stationed 15 submarines along their expected route. A plan for coordinated attacks on the ships by the U.S. Navy and USAAF was developed.

At the time, the U.S. Seventh Fleet was assigned four battleships in Filipino waters to guard the Allied beachhead at Lingayen Gulf in Luzon against attacks by the Japanese forces based at Lingga Roads and the Inland Sea until the USAAF forces in the region were strong enough to assume this responsibility. (Note: The four battleships were USS Colorado, Mississippi, Pennsylvania and West Virginia.) As of early February, the USAAF units in the Philippines were focused on supporting the United States Army–led Philippines Campaign and attacking Japanese facilities in Formosa. An intensive campaign against Japanese shipping in the South China Sea had been planned, but was yet to begin.

== Voyage ==
The Completion Force's approximate route between Singapore and Japan

The Completion Force sailed from Singapore on the evening of 10 February. The timing of its departure was set by a long-term forecast of bad weather for the voyage to Japan. The British submarine HMS Tantalus observed the ships leaving port and attempted to attack them on 11 February, but was driven off by a Japanese aircraft. Following this action, Tantalus radioed a contact report to Fife's headquarters. The four U.S. Navy battleships at Lingayen Gulf sailed on 10 February bound for U.S. bases in the Pacific where they were to receive repairs and undertake preparations ahead of their role supporting the invasion of Okinawa. The ships left the Philippines area on 14 February without having played any part in efforts to intercept the Completion Force.

U.S. Navy submarines unsuccessfully attempted to attack the Japanese ships on 12 February. At about 1:45 p.m., USS Charr detected the Completion Force at a distance of 9 mi (7.8 nmi; 14 km) using her radar and transmitted a contact report. An hour later, USS Blackfin made radar contact with the Japanese ships at a range of 15 mi (13 nmi; 24 km). Over the next 14 hours the submarines Blackfin, Charr, Flounder, Pargo and Tuna attempted to reach a position where they could attack the Japanese ships, but were unable to do so. A group of submarines to the north—comprising USS Guavina, Hake and Pampanito—was unable to reach a position where they could attack the Completion Force.

USAAF patrols made contact with the Completion Force on 12 February; following this, it was tracked almost continuously by radar-equipped Army Air Forces and U.S. Navy aircraft. On the morning of 13 February, a force of B-24 Liberator heavy bombers and 40 B-25 Mitchell medium bombers escorted by 48 P-51 Mustang fighters was dispatched from several bases on the islands of Leyte and Mindoro to attack the Japanese ships. While the aircraft successfully rendezvoused near the Completion Force, heavy cloud cover kept them from spotting any of the ships. As radar-directed blind bombing was prohibited to avoid accidental attacks on the Allied submarines in the area, the strike force returned to its bases without attacking. On the same day, the Australian destroyers HMAS Arunta and Warramunga departed Lingayen Gulf and proceeded to a position about 300 mi (260 nmi; 480 km) west of Manila where they were held in readiness to rescue the crews of any aircraft downed while attacking the Completion Force.

More submarines attempted to attack the Japanese force on 13 February. A group of three boats—comprising USS Bergall, Blower and Guitarro—was deployed along its route, and Bergall sighted the Japanese ships at 12:30 p.m. The submarine was submerged at the time and attempted to maneuver into a firing position, but could not get any closer to the ships than 4,800 yd (4,400 m). Nevertheless, it fired six torpedoes at the Japanese force, all of which missed. Blower attempted a submerged attack, firing five torpedoes at one of the battleship-carriers and Ōyodo; all missed. USS Bashaw and Flasher, the northernmost submarines that Rear Admiral Fife had deployed, encountered the Completion Force during the afternoon of 13 February. Bashaw sighted the Japanese ships as they emerged from a rain squall at 3:15 p.m., but one of the battleship-carriers spotted the submarine and launched an aircraft to attack it. Bashaw was forced to dive when the battleship-carrier began shelling it with her main battery, and neither it nor Flasher was able to intercept the Completion Force. During this period the other submarines in the area continued to chase the Japanese ships but did not regain contact with them.

An air attack was attempted against the Completion Force on 14 February. The number of B-24s, B-25s and escorting P-51s dispatched on this day was smaller than the force which had been used on 13 February, as the Japanese ships were now beyond the range of aircraft based at Leyte. Once again, cloud cover over the Completion Force prevented the Allied aircraft from sighting the Japanese ships, and they were unable to attack due to the prohibition on radar-aimed bombing. As a result, the only successes gained by the USAAF aircraft involved in the operation were to shoot down a Mitsubishi Ki-57 "Topsy" transport plane near the Completion Force on 13 February as well as several fighters in the area of the ships between the 12th and 14th of the month. The two Australian destroyers were released for other duties on 15 February.

Vice Admiral Charles A. Lockwood—the commander of the U.S. Pacific Fleet's submarine force—followed the unsuccessful attempts to intercept the Completion Force in the South China Sea, and stationed a further eleven submarines along its projected route between the Luzon Strait and Japan. The Completion Force reached the Matsu Islands at the northern end of the Formosa Strait in the evening of 15 February, and anchored there for five hours. The Japanese ships resumed their journey to Kure via Korea and the Shimonoseki Strait at midnight, and the destroyers Kamikaze and Nokaze were attached to the force for part of the day. At 5:07 am on 16 February, USS Rasher intercepted the Completion Force south of the Chinese city of Wenzhou and fired six torpedoes at one of the escorts, but all missed. At this time the Japanese ships were sailing at a speed of 18 knots (33 km/h). None of the other American submarines made contact with the Japanese force as it sailed to the east of where they had been positioned by Lockwood.

The Completion Force finished its entire voyage in about 10 days; after slipping the Allied patrols it anchored off Zhoushan Island near Shanghai from 9:06 p.m. on 16 February until 7:00 a.m. on 18 February, when it sailed for Sanzenpo Harbor near Sacheon on the southern coast of Korea. It arrived there at 4 p.m. that day, and anchored overnight. The Completion Force departed Sanzenpo Harbor at 7 a.m. on 19 February and reached the Japanese island of Mutsurejima at 4 p.m. that day. After anchoring overnight, the Completion Force docked at Kure at 10 a.m. on 20 February. The ships of the Completion Force were among the last Japanese warships to reach the home islands from the Southwest Pacific.

== Aftermath ==
The Allied naval commanders were disappointed by the failure of the 26 submarines directed against the Completion Force to inflict any damage on the ships. Fife concluded that this was due to the Completion Force's high speed, the poor weather conditions at the time of the operation and the Japanese ships being fitted with equipment that enabled them to detect submarines' radar signals. In a letter to Lockwood, he wrote that the failure of the submarines under his command "was a bitter pill to take and I make no alibi". Lockwood attributed the decision to deploy his submarines too far to the west on faulty intelligence, and told Fife that "our dope certainly went sour at the last moment. Perhaps I depended too much on it".

The use of freighters and warships to carry oil was successful in increasing Japanese oil imports, and the total level quality of oil which reached the country during the first quarter of 1945 was greater than the amounts achieved in late 1944. Nevertheless, Allied submarines sank the majority of the merchant tankers that attempted to sail from Southeast Asia to Japan during February, and in March the Japanese ceased attempting to import oil from this source. Following the departure of the Completion Force, the only major seaworthy Japanese warships remaining in the Southwest Pacific were the heavy cruisers Ashigara and Haguro as well as the light cruiser Isuzu. These three cruisers did not attempt to return to Japan, and all were sunk by Allied submarines and destroyers between April and June.

After reaching Japan, Ise and Hyūga were assigned to bolster the anti-aircraft defenses of the city of Kure and its naval base. Due to shortages of fuel and aircraft, the ships did not put to sea again, and both were sunk during the U.S. Navy's attacks on Kure between 24 and 28 July 1945. Ōyodo became part of the Kure Training Force and remained in port until she was sunk on 28 July. The three destroyers also failed to survive the war; Asashimo and Kasumi fell victim to American carrier aircraft while escorting the battleship Yamato during Operation Ten-Go on 6 April, and Hatsushimo sank after striking a mine near Maizuru on 30 July.

== See also ==
- The Channel Dash was conducted by the German Kriegsmarine in February 1942; it was a successful operation to return both Scharnhorst-class battlecruisers along with an escort group including the Prinz Eugen, to German waters from France, using the heavily patrolled English Channel.
- Operation Scylla, a minor-scale operation carried out by the Italian Royal Navy in July 1943.
