= Japanese torpedo boat Shirataka =

Japanese torpedo boat

History

Empire of Japan
- Name: Shirataka
- Ordered: 1885
- Builder: Schichau-Werke, Danzig, Germany
- Laid down: 3 March 1899
- Launched: 10 June 1899
- Completed: 22 June 1900
- Decommissioned: 15 November 1923
- Fate: Sold 6 April 1927

General characteristics
- Type: Torpedo boat
- Displacement: 126 long tons (128 t)
- Length: 152 ft 6 in (46.48 m)
- Beam: 16 ft 9 in (5.11 m)
- Draught: 4 ft 3 in (1 m)
- Propulsion: Coal-fired engine, 2,600 ihp (1,939 kW)
- Speed: 28 knots (32 mph; 52 km/h)
- Complement: 26
- Armament: 3 × 42 mm (1.7 in) QF guns; 3 × 355 mm (14.0 in) torpedo tubes

The Shirataka (”White hawk”) was a 1st class torpedo boat (suiraitei) of the Imperial Japanese Navy. She was ordered under the Ten Year Naval Expansion Programme passed in 1896 from the shipbuilder Schichau-Werke (as Yard No. 629) in Danzig, Germany, where she was built during 1897–98 in parts along Japanese specifications, and then re-assembled by Mitsubishi in Nagasaki, Japan.

She participated in the Russo-Japanese War (1904–1905). She was decommissioned on 15 November 1923, and sold to break up on 6 April 1927.

== Design ==
In common with all the other early torpedo boat destroyers and 1st class torpedo boats, the Shirataka had a "turtle-back" forecastle intended to prevent seawater covering the forecastle and throwing excessive spray over the control area. Unlike the two-funnel Hayabusa class, the Shirataka had a single funnel amidships, and was completed with three 3-pounder (42mm) QF guns (two abreast just forward of the funnel, and one aft on the centreline). These were later replaced by two 57mm guns and one 47mm 40-cal gun. She also carried three 14-inch torpedo tubes (two abreast just abaft of the funnel, and one aft of the gun on the centreline).

Her machinery comprised two Schichau water-tube boilers, and two 3-cylinder VTE engines developing 2,600 ihp. She carried 30 tons of coal.
