= Hayabusa-class torpedo boat =

Class of imperial Japanese torpedo boats

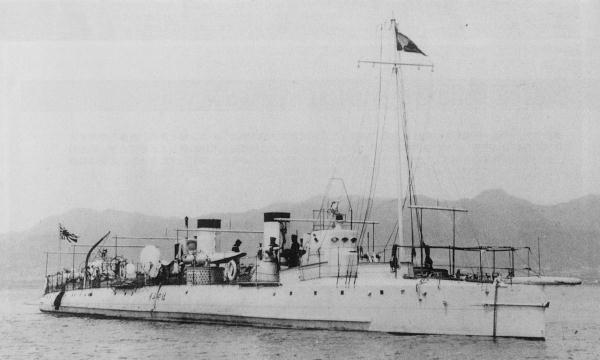
- Hayabusa in 1900 at Kobe

Class overview
- Name: Hayabusa class
- Operators: Imperial Japanese Navy
- Succeeded by: Chidori class
- Built: 1900–1904
- In commission: 1900 to 1923
- Completed: 15

General characteristics
- Type: Torpedo boat
- Displacement: 152 long tons (154 t)
- Length: 45 m (147 ft 8 in) pp 46.33 m (152 ft 0 in) overall
- Beam: 4.9 m (16 ft 1 in)
- Draught: 1.5 m (4 ft 11 in)
- Propulsion: 2-shaft reciprocating, 2 boilers, 4,200 ihp (3,100 kW)
- Speed: 29 knots (33 mph; 54 km/h)
- Range: 2,000 nmi (3,700 km; 2,300 mi) at 10 knots (19 km/h; 12 mph)
- Complement: 30
- Armament: 1 × 57 mm (2.2 in) gun; 2 × 47 mm (1.9 in) guns; 3 × 450 mm (18 in) torpedo tubes

The Hayabusa-class torpedo boats (Hayabusa-gata suiraitei) were a class of fifteen 1st class torpedo boats constructed for the Imperial Japanese Navy as part of the 1896 Ten Year Naval Expansion Programme. They were completed between 1900 and 1904.

All of the vessels served in the Russo-Japanese War. They were notable for their attacks on the Russian fleet on the night of 27/28 May 1905 during the Battle of Tsushima, expending many torpedoes. They were able to inflict significant damage on a number of Russian ships, that were scuttled or sunk the next day.

After serving in World War I, all fifteen vessels were decommissioned between 1919 and 1923; some were scrapped, others turned into auxiliaries. For example, Kiji was used at the Navy Torpedo School in Yokosuka from 15 December 1923 to 2 October 1926.

== Ships ==
Under the 1897-98 Programme four torpedo boats were ordered from France as improved versions of the French Cyclone class torpedo boats built for the French Navy. These were all fabricated by Normand Shipyard, Le Havre in France and shipped dis-assembled to Japan, where they were re-assembled.

| Name | Meaning | Launched | Completed | Fate |
|---|---|---|---|---|
| Hayabusa | ("peregrine falcon") | 1899 | 1899 | harbour service 1919; struck 1919; broken up 1922 |
| Kasasagi | ("magpie") | 1900 | 1900 | harbour service 1919; struck 1919; broken up 1925 |
| Manazuru | ("white-naped crane") | 1900 | 1900 | harbour service 1919; struck 1919; broken up 1925 |
| Chidori | ("plover") | 1901 | 1901 | harbour service 1910; struck 1919 and broken up |

Under the 1900-01 Programme another six torpedo boats were ordered to be built in Japan, with a further five vessels ordered under the 1901-02 Programme, also from Japanese yards. These were formally listed as the Aotaka Class, but were identical copies of the Hayabusa Class. All fifteen of these vessels took part in the Battle of Tsushima where they comprised the Ninth, Fourteenth, Fifteenth, and Nineteenth Torpedo Boat Divisions.

Kiji ran aground backward on 31st. March 1904 at the South-end of Tsushima on a mine laying mission after accidentally moving into a previously laid minefield. The hull was discarded, but parts were recovered and the ship was rebuilt at Kure Naval Arsenal under the resource/budget account 'Repair'. Construction was completed on 9 May 1905 in time for Battle of Tsushima.

| Name | Meaning | Builder | Launched | Completed | Fate |
|---|---|---|---|---|---|
| Aotaka | ("northern goshawk") | Kure Kaigun Kōshō (Kure Naval Arsenal) | 14 March 1903 | 1903 | struck 1922, broken up 1927 |
| Kari | ("wild goose") | Kure Kaigun Kōshō (Kure Naval Arsenal) | 14 March 1903 | 1903 | struck 1922, broken up 1930 |
| Hato | ("dove") | Kure Kaigun Kōshō (Kure Naval Arsenal) | 22 August 1903 | 1903 | struck 1922, broken up 1926 |
| Tsubame | ("swallow") | Kure Kaigun Kōshō (Kure Naval Arsenal) | 21 October 1903 | 1904 | struck 1922, broken up 1925 |
| Hibari | ("lark") | Kure Kaigun Kōshō (Kure Naval Arsenal) | 21 October 1903 | 1904 | struck 1922, broken up 1925 |
| Kiji | ("pheasant") | Kure Kaigun Kōshō (Kure Naval Arsenal) | 5 November 1903 | 1904 | struck 1922, broken up 1926 |
| Hashitaka | ("sparrowhawk") | Kawasaki Jyūkō Co. (Kawasaki Shipbuilding Corp.), Kobe | December 1903 | 1904 | struck 1923 and broken up |
| Sagi | ("snowy heron") | Kawasaki Jyūkō Co. (Kawasaki Shipbuilding Corp.), Kobe | 21 December 1903 | 1904 | struck 1923, broken up 1925 |
| Uzura | ("quail") | Kawasaki Jyūkō Co. (Kawasaki Shipbuilding Corp.), Kobe | 29 February 1904 | 1904 | struck 1923, broken up 1932 |
| Kamome | ("gull") | Kawasaki Jyūkō Co. (Kawasaki Shipbuilding Corp.), Kobe | 30 April 1904 | 1904 | struck 1923, sold 1928 |
| Õtori | ("stork") | Kawasaki Jyūkō Co. (Kawasaki Shipbuilding Corp.), Kobe | April 1904 | 1904 | struck 1923 and broken up |

== Other torpedo boats of the Imperial Japanese Navy before and during the Russo-Japanese War ==
The Hayabusa-class were only 15 of the 64 torpedo boats the Imperial Japanese Navy possessed in the Russo-Japanese War. These were divided into three groups - the First, Second, and Third classes. The First-class torpedo boats were given names, while the Second and Third classes were only given numbers prefixed by a "No." (e.g No.28).

The Ten Year Naval Expansion Programme passed in 1896 provided for the construction (along with 4 battleships, 6 armoured and 6 protected cruisers, and 4 other minor warships) of 23 torpedo boat destroyers and 63 torpedo boats; the latter comprised 16 First Class of 120 tons (the Hayabusa class plus the Shirataka), 37 Second Class of 80 tons and 10 Third Class of 54 tons; a further 26 Third Class boats were planned but never ordered.

=== First Class ===
Apart from the Hayabusa class, this group included three other (older) boats built in Britain and Germany: their armament consisted of three 360-mm torpedo tubes (except for the Kotaka, which had six) and with the exception of the Hayabusa class between two and four 37mm guns.

- the Kotaka ("little falcon") built 1887 by Yarrow, and widely considered to be the first torpedo boat destroyer and certainly their immediate ancestor,
- the Fukuryū ("fortune dragon") built 1886 at Germania, Kiel for China as Fulong, captured 1896 in the First Sino-Japanese War,
- the Shirataka ("white hawk"), built 1899 by Schichau-Werke at Danzig.

=== Second Class ===
These were armed with three torpedo tubes and two or three 37mm guns, with the exception of the No.39 and No.67 classes which instead of the 37mm guns had two 3pdr guns.

- No.21 Class; No.21 was built by Normand at Le Havre in 1892, based on the French 36-metre type. No.24 was an identical vessel built at Kure Navy Yard in 1894 from imported materials.
- No.22 Class; No.22 and No.23 were built by Schichau, Elbing in 1893. No.25 was an identical vessel built at Nagasaki in 1895 from imported materials.
- No.29 Class; No.29 and No.30 were the first boats built under the 1897 Ten Year Programme. They were built by Normand, Le Havre
- No.31 Class; No.31 to No.38, also No.44 to No.49 and No.60 and No.61. These were all Schichau 39-metre type fabricated at Danzig in 1899-1902 and shipped to Kawasaki at Kobe (No.37 and No.38 to Mitsubishi at Nagasaki) for erection.
- No.39 Class; No.39 to No.43, also No.62 to No.66. These were all built by Yarrow at Poplar and shipped complete to Japan. No.42 was sunk off Port Arthur on 15 December 1904 and the others were removed from the list in 1914-15 (No.66 in 1918).
- No.67 Class; No.67 to No.75 were very similar to the No.39 Class, but were built in Japan from Yarrow designs (developed from the British Navy's Nos. 82-87) and all launched in 1902–03. No.67 was lost at Tsushima on 27 May 1905, and the others were struck from the list in 1922.

=== Third Class ===
These were essentially harbour defence boats of ca.54 tons, which were armed with two or three torpedo tubes and two 37mm guns.

- No.1 Class; No.1 to No.4 were ordered from Yarrow, Poplar in 1879, modelled by Sir Edward Reed on the Royal Navy's 100-foot type, and shipped in sections to Japan for assembly and launch in 1880. All four were relegated to harbour service in 1898, and were broken up in 1904.
- No.5 Class; No.5 to No.14 were ordered under the 1882 Programme and were manufactured by Schneider-Creusot at Chalon-sur-Saône, based on the French 35-metre type. Shipped and re-assembled in Japan between 1890 and 1892. All were struck from the list in 1907–10.
- No.15 Class; No.15 and No.20 were similarly built by Normand Shipyard, Le Havre, but based on the French 34-metre type.
- No.16 Class; No.16 to No.19 were further units of the No.5 Class built by Creusot in 1892. N.16 capsized and sank off the Pescadores Islands on 11 May 1895, while the remaining three were struck in 1910 and broken up.
- No.26 Class; No.26 and No.27, together with the slightly different No.28, were ex-Chinese torpedo boats all captured at Wei Hai Wei on 7 February 1895. They were stricken in 1908 (No.28 in 1902).
- No.50 Class; No.50 to No.59 were the final batch of 54-ton torpedo boats, improved versions of the No.15 Class.
