= Imperial Japanese Navy order of battle 1941 =

Order of battle

== Order of battle ==
=== Warships ===
IJN at time of Pearl Harbor Attack in December 1941:

==== Battleships ====
- 10 (plus 3 building) (1)
  - 4 Kongō class — converted from battlecruisers. Built in 1913–1915.
    - Kongō — †November 1944
    - Hiei — †November 1942
    - Kirishima — †November 1942
    - Haruna — †July 1945
  - 2 Fusō class — built 1915–1917
    - Fusō — †October 1944
    - Yamashiro — †October 1944
  - 2 Ise class — built 1917–1918
    - Ise — †July 1945
    - Hyūga — run aground in July 1945
  - 2 Nagato class — built 1920–1921
    - Nagato
    - Mutsu — †June 1943
  - 0 Yamato class (3 building (1 converted to aircraft carrier Shinano) and 1 cancelled later in 1941).
    - Yamato — commissioned 1941 † 1945
    - Musashi — commissioned 1942 † 1944
    - The fourth of the class, Hull Number 111 was scrapped in 1942 when only 30% complete, and a proposed fifth hull, Number 797, proposed in the 1942 5th Supplementary Program, was never ordered.

==== Aircraft carriers ====
- 6 heavy and 6 light (plus 7 building )(1)
  - Hōshō built in 1922
  - Akagi (2) (ex-battlecruiser converted by 1927) — †1942
  - Kaga (ex-battleship converted in 1928) — †1942
  - Ryūjō completed 1933 — †1942
  - Sōryū — †1942
  - Hiryū — †1942
  - 2 Zuihō class commissioned as aircraft carriers 1940–1941
    - Shōhō - †1942
    - Zuihō - †1944
  - 2 Shōkaku class built 1941
    - Shōkaku — †1944
    - Zuikaku — †1944
  - 3 Taiyō class
    - Taiyō — †1944
    - Chūyō — †1943
    - Unyō — †1944
  - 2 Hiyō class
    - Hiyō — †1944
    - Jun'yō
  - Shinano (ex-battleship converted in 1942–44) — †1944

(1) Does not include Imperial Japanese Army built aircraft transports.
(2) Amagi — sister ship to Akagi both as a battlecruiser and as a conversion to an aircraft carrier, was destroyed during construction by an earthquake and replaced with the Kaga.

==== Heavy cruisers ====
- 18 (plus 1 building) (1)
  - 2 Furutaka built 1926–1927
  - 2 Aoba built 1926–1927
  - 4 Myōkō built 1928–1929
  - 4 Takao built 1932
  - 4 Mogami built 1935–1937(2)
  - 2 Tone built 1941

(1) Ibuki ordered but not laid down (2) Mogamis designated light cruisers but were built to be up-gunned as heavies once the London Naval Treaty was broken.

==== Light cruisers ====
- 20 (plus 5 building) (1)
  - 2 Tenryū built 1919
  - 5 Kuma built 1920–1921
  - 1 Yubari built 1923
  - 3 Sendai built 1924–1925
  - 6 Nagara built 1922–1925
  - 3 Katori (1 cancelled) built 1938–1940

(1) 4 Agano and 2 Ōyodo (1 cancelled).

==== Destroyers ====
- 115 (plus 43 building) (1)
  - 3 Momi-class destroyer (3) built 1920–1922
  - 13 Minekaze-class destroyer built 1920–1922
  - 6 Wakatake-class destroyer built 1922–1923
  - 9 Kamikaze-class destroyer built 1922–1924
  - 12 Mutsuki-class destroyer built 1925–1927
  - 19 Fubuki-class destroyer built 1926–1933 (included Ayanami subclass)
  - 4 Akatsuki-class destroyer built 1932–1933 (subclass of Fubuki class)
  - 6 Hatsuharu-class destroyer built 1933–1935
  - 10 Shiratsuyu-class destroyer built 1936–1937
  - 10 Asashio-class destroyer built 1937–1938
  - 19 Kagerō-class destroyer built 1939
  - 4 Yūgumo-class destroyer built 1941

(1) 27 Yūgumo class and 16 Akizuki-class building (2) Others ships of the Momi-class were re-rated as patrol vessels. Also, note than Momi name was assigned in 1944 to a Matsu-class destroyer ship

==== Submarines ====
- 68 Fleet submarines
- 50 Ko-hyoteki-class midget submarines

==== Others ====
- 90 patrol ships, gunboats, armed merchant ships, and submarine chasers
- 6 minelayers
  - Itsukushima
- 42 minesweepers
- 55 auxiliaries

=== Merchant ships ===
Many under direct navy control as armed merchantmen.

- 1939 - 2,337 with 5,629,845 tons
- World War II construction of 4,250,000 tons
- 2,346 sunk

== Aircraft ==
- Total 1,750 first line with 370 trainers
  - 660 Fighters
  - 330 Carrier based strike aircraft
  - 240 Land-based twin engine bombers
  - 520 Seaplanes and flying boats.

== Commanders ==
Imperial Japanese Navy commanders at the time of the Attack on Pearl Harbor:

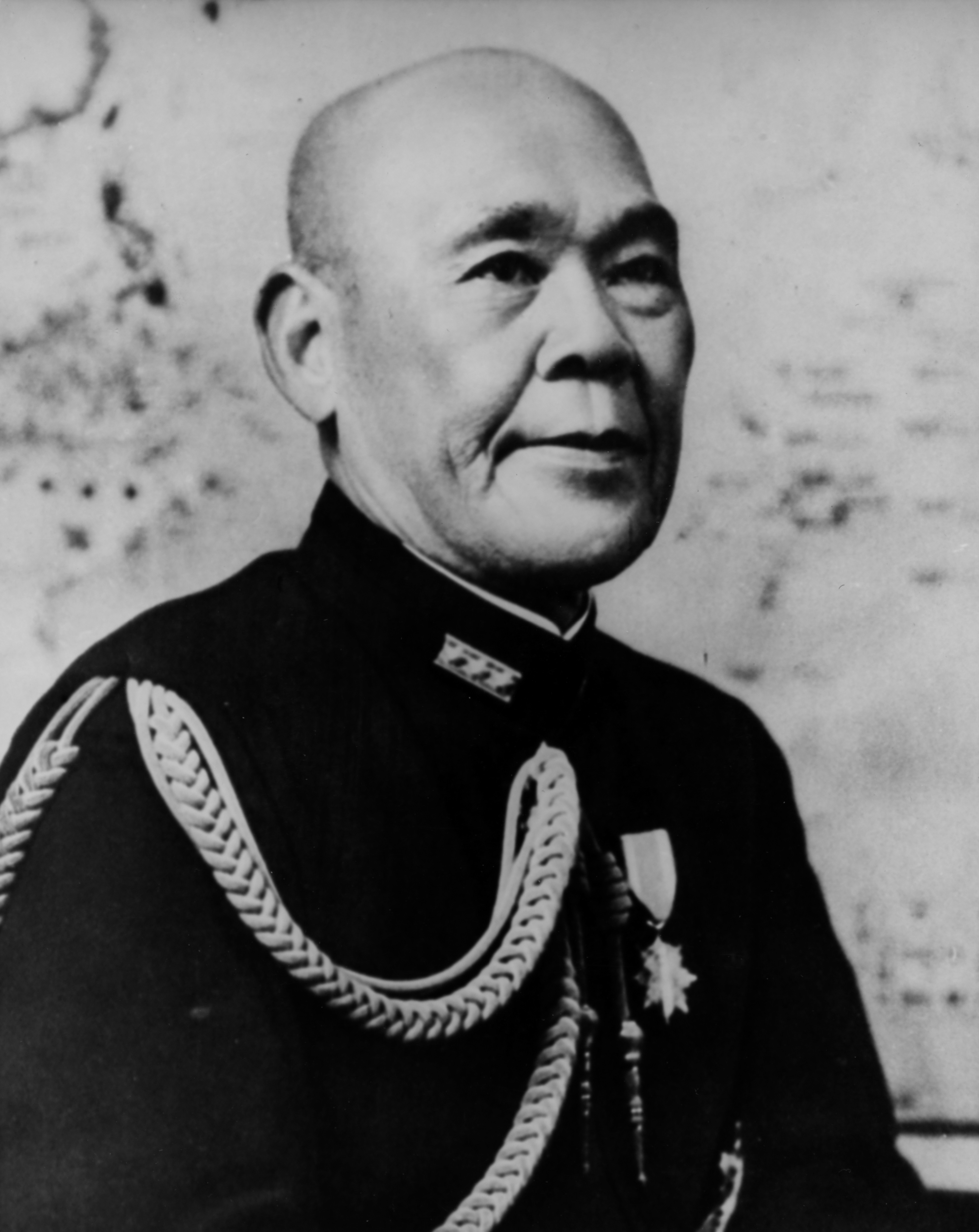
Admiral Osami Nagano (Chief of the Imperial Japanese Navy General Staff)

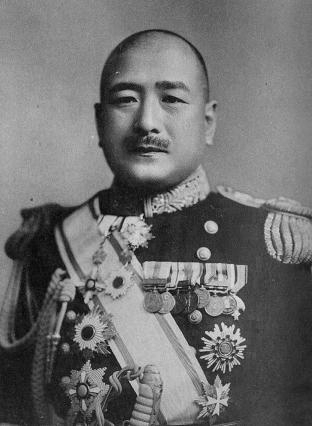
Admiral Shigetarō Shimada (Minister of the Navy)

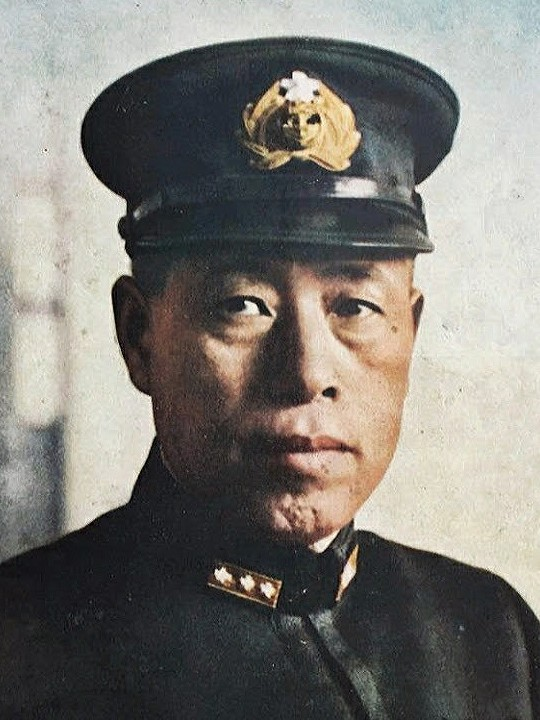
Admiral Isoroku Yamamoto (Commander-in-Chief of the Combined Fleet)

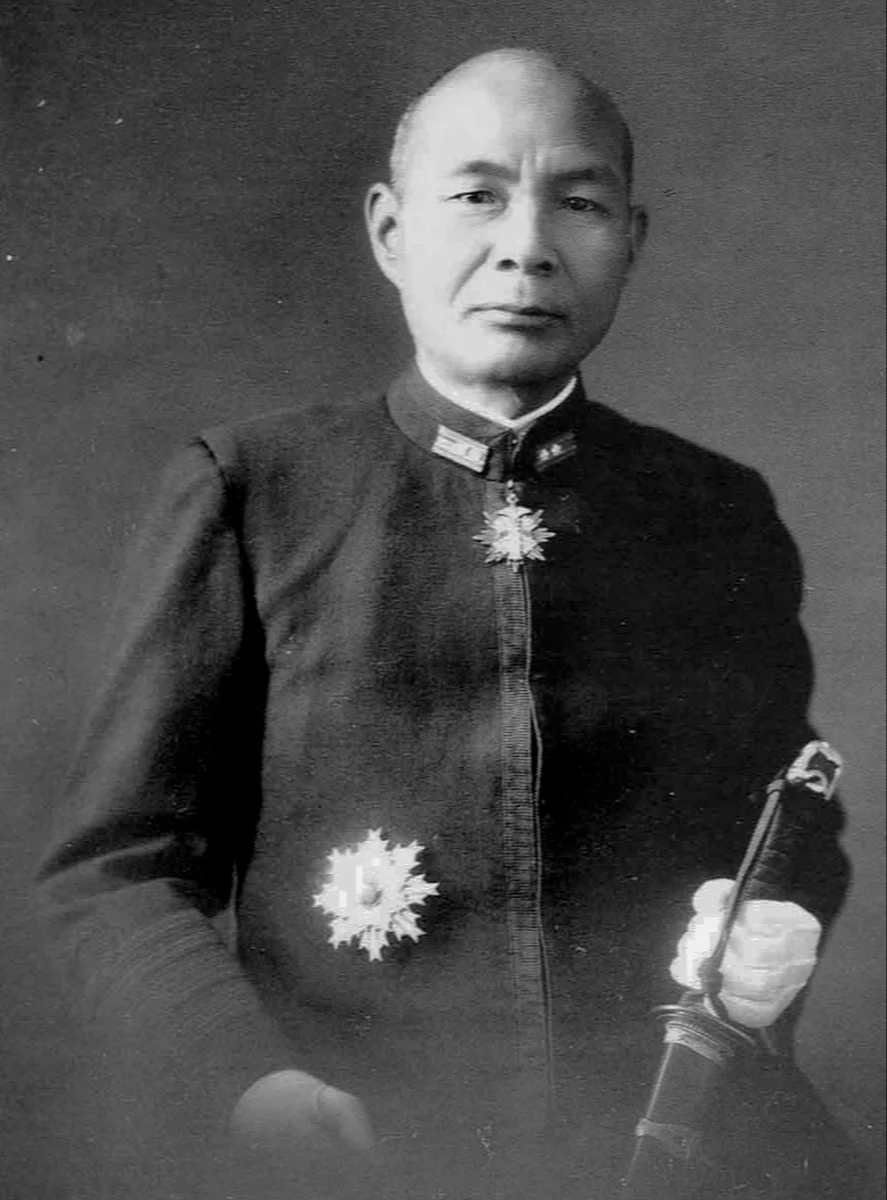
Rear Admiral Matome Ugaki (Chief-of-Staff of the Combined Fleet)

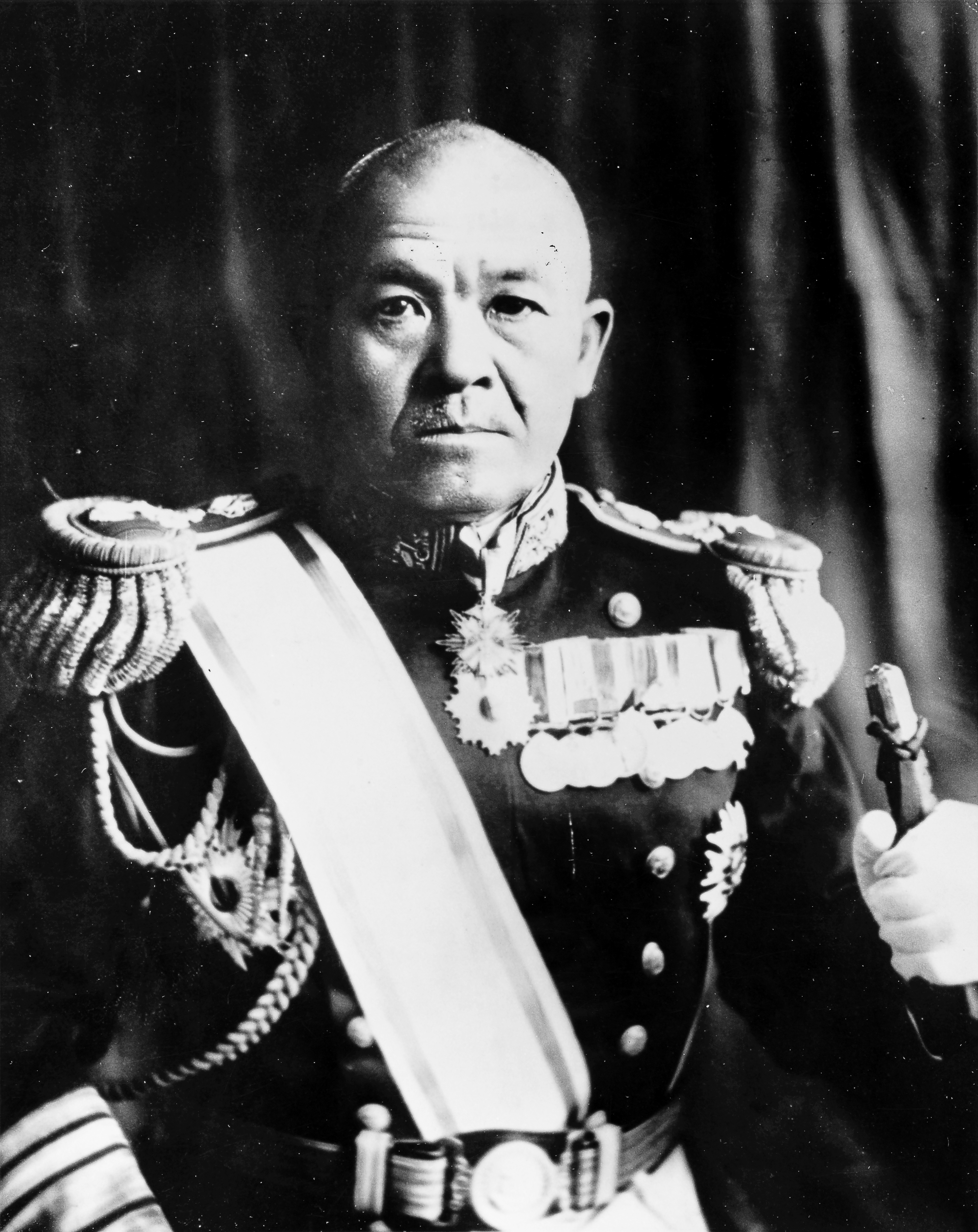
Vice Admiral Chūichi Nagumo (Commander-in-Chief of the First Air Fleet)

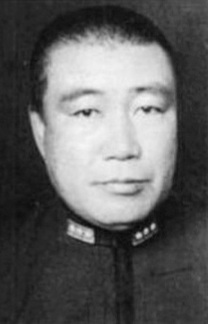
Rear Admiral Ryūnosuke Kusaka (Chief-of-Staff of the First Air Fleet)

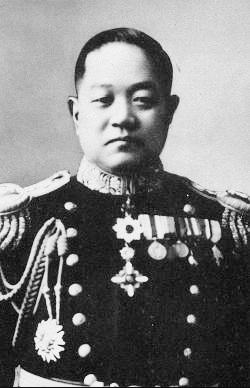
Vice Admiral Shirō Takasu (Commander-in-Chief of the 1st Fleet)

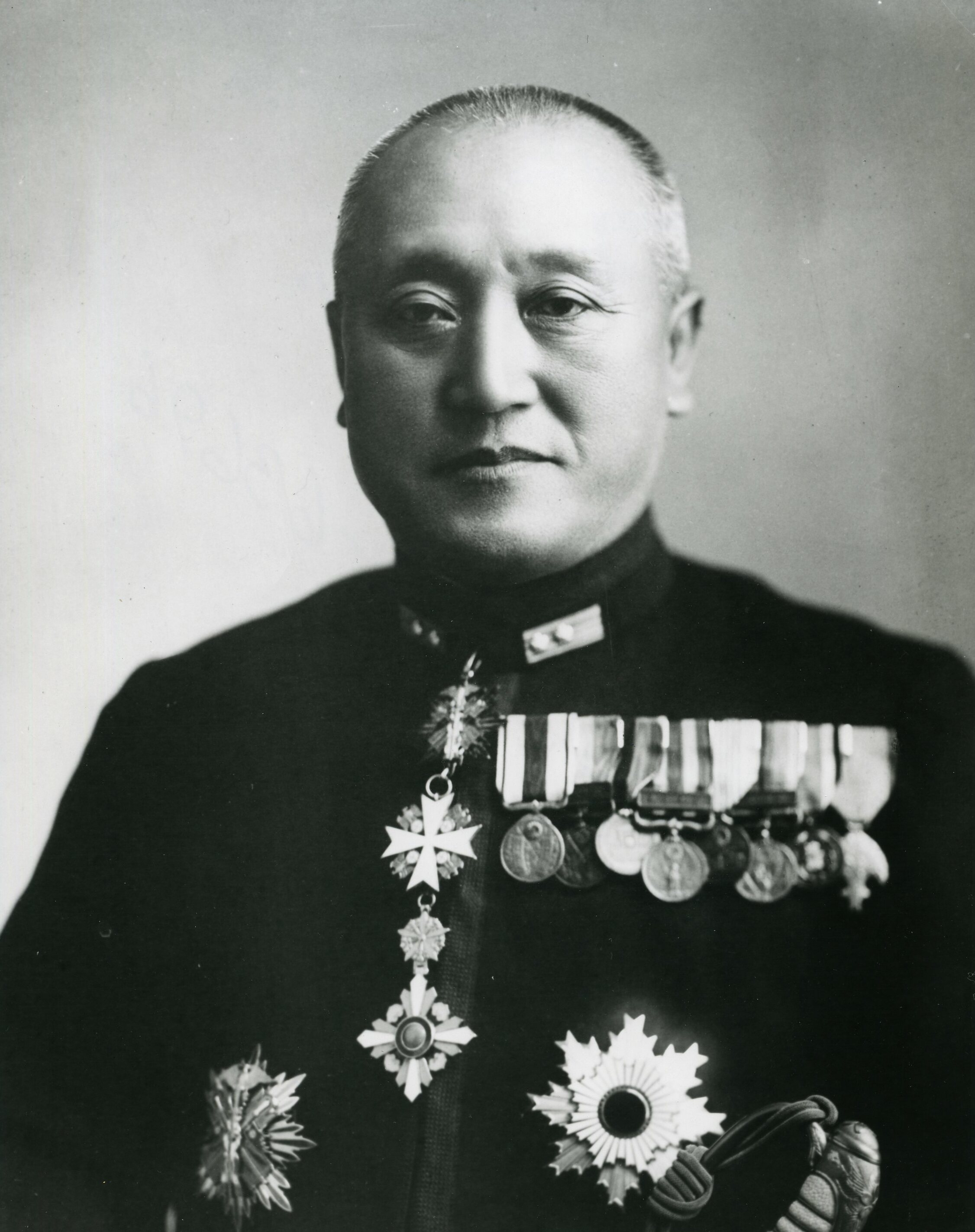
Vice Admiral Nobutake Kondō (Commander-in-Chief of the 2nd Fleet)

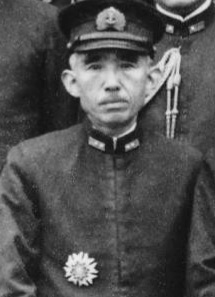
Vice Admiral Ibō Takahashi (Commander-in-Chief of the 3rd Fleet)

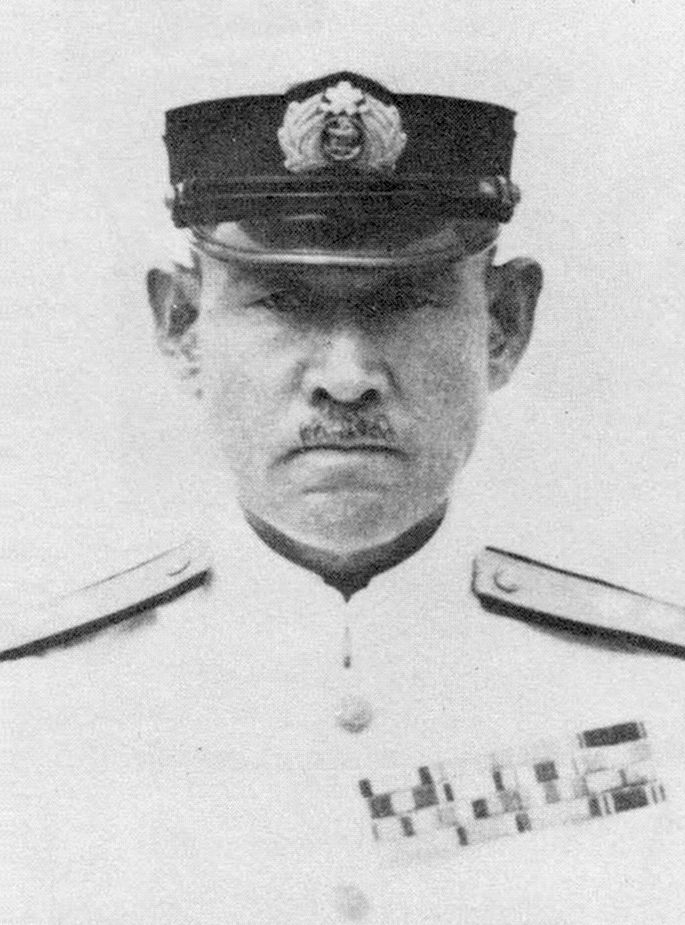
Vice Admiral Shigeyoshi Inoue (Commander-in-Chief of the 4th Fleet)

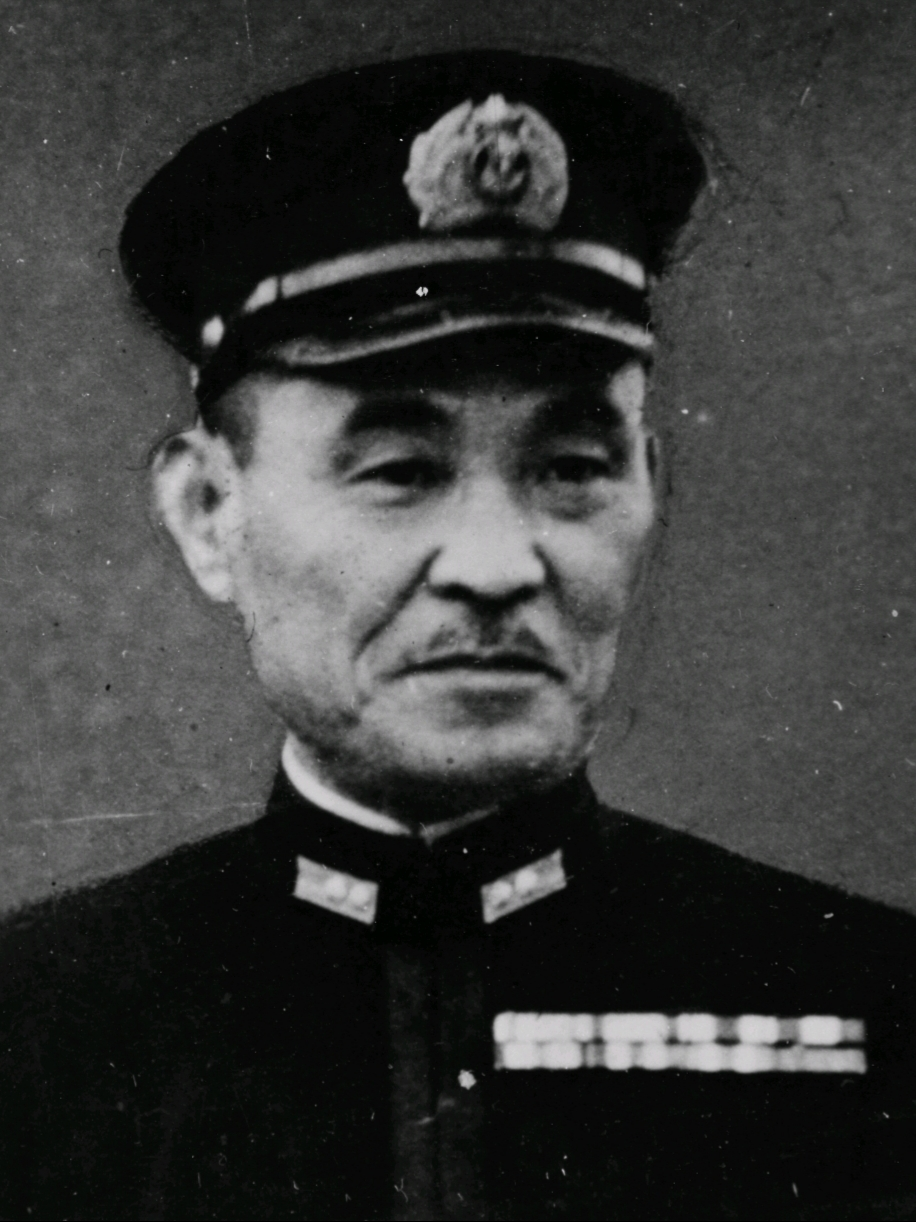
Vice Admiral Boshirō Hosogaya (Commander-in-Chief of the 5th Fleet)

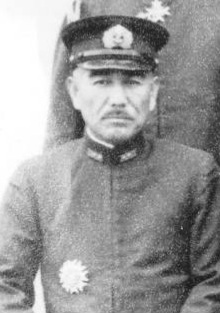
Vice Admiral Mitsumi Shimizu (Commander-in-Chief of the 6th Fleet)

== See also ==
- List of Japanese Navy ships and war vessels in World War II
