= Japanese battleship Mutsu =

Japanese WW2 battleship

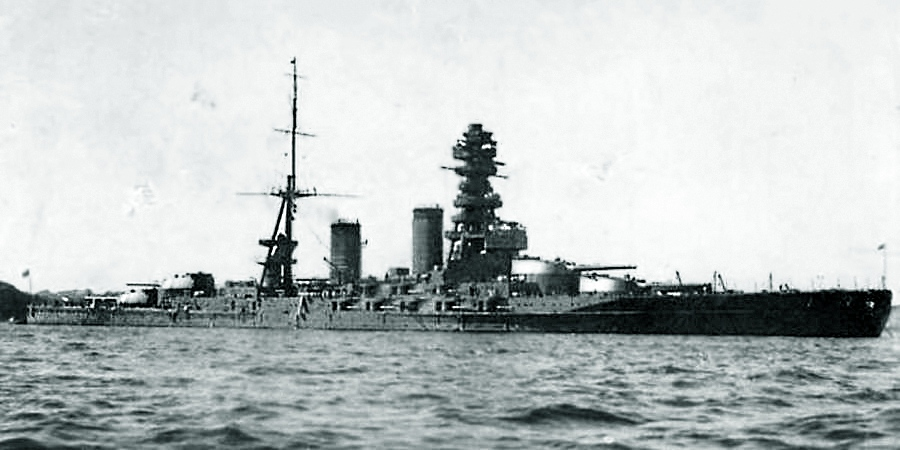
- Mutsu around 1922

History

Empire of Japan
- Name: Mutsu
- Namesake: Mutsu Province
- Builder: Yokosuka Naval Arsenal
- Laid down: 1 June 1918
- Launched: 31 May 1920
- Commissioned: 24 October 1921
- Stricken: 1 September 1943
- Fate: Sunk by internal explosion, 8 June 1943

General characteristics (as built)
- Class & type: Nagato-class battleship
- Displacement: 32,720 t (32,200 long tons) (standard)
- Length: 215.8 m (708 ft) (o/a)
- Beam: 28.96 m (95 ft)
- Draft: 9 m (29 ft 6 in)
- Installed power: 21 × water-tube boilers; 80,000 shp (60,000 kW)
- Propulsion: 4 shafts; 4 × steam turbines
- Speed: 26.5 knots (49.1 km/h; 30.5 mph)
- Range: 5,500 nmi (10,200 km; 6,300 mi) at 16 knots (30 km/h; 18 mph)
- Complement: 1,333 (1921); 1,475 (1942)
- Armament: 4 × twin 41 cm (16.1 in) guns; 20 × single 14 cm (5.5 in) guns; 4 × single 76 mm (3 in) AA guns; 8 × 533 mm (21 in) torpedo tubes
- Armour: Waterline belt: 305–100 mm (12.0–3.9 in); Deck: 69 mm (2.7 in) + 75 mm (3.0 in); Gun turrets: 356–190 mm (14.0–7.5 in); Barbettes: 305 mm (12.0 in); Conning tower: 369 mm (14.5 in)

General characteristics (1943)
- Displacement: 39,050 tonnes (38,430 long tons) (standard)
- Length: 224.94 m (738 ft)
- Beam: 34.6 m (113 ft 6 in)
- Draft: 9.46 m (31 ft)
- Installed power: 10 × water-tube boilers; 82,578 shp (61,578 kW)
- Speed: 25.28 knots (46.8 km/h; 29.1 mph)
- Range: 8,650 nmi (16,020 km; 9,950 mi) at 16 knots (30 km/h; 18 mph)
- Complement: 1,475
- Armament: 4 × twin 41 cm guns; 18 × single 14 cm guns; 4 × twin 12.7 cm DP guns; 10 × twin 25 mm AA guns
- Armour: Deck: 69 mm (2.7 in) + 100 mm (3.9 in) + 38 mm (1.5 in); Gun turrets: 508–190 mm (20.0–7.5 in); Barbettes: 457 mm (18.0 in)
- Aircraft carried: 3 × floatplanes
- Aviation facilities: 1 × catapult

Mutsu (Japanese: 陸奥; named after the ancient Mutsu Province) was the second and last Nagato-class dreadnought battleship built for the Imperial Japanese Navy (IJN) at the end of World War I. She continued to serve through World War II until an internal explosion killed 1,121 of the people on board.

In 1923 she carried supplies for the survivors of the Great Kantō earthquake. The ship was modernized in 1934–1936 with improvements to her armour and machinery, and a rebuilt superstructure in the pagoda mast style.

Other than participating in the Battle of Midway and the Battle of the Eastern Solomons in 1942, where she did not see any significant combat, Mutsu spent most of the first year of the Pacific War in training. She returned to Japan in early 1943. That June, one of her aft magazines detonated while she was at anchor, sinking the ship with the loss most of the 1,474 people on board, with only 353 survivors. The IJN investigation into the cause of her loss concluded that it was the work of a disgruntled crew member. The navy dispersed the survivors in an attempt to conceal the sinking in the interest of morale in Japan. Much of the wreck was scrapped after the war, but some artifacts and relics are on display in Japan, and a small portion of the ship remains where she was sunk.

== Description ==
Mutsu had a length of 201.17 metres (660 ft) between perpendiculars and 215.8 metres (708 ft) overall. She had a beam of 28.96 metres (95 ft) and a draught of 9 metres (29 ft 6 in). The ship displaced 32,720 tonnes (32,200 long tons) at standard load and 39,116 tonnes (38,498 long tons) at full load. Her crew consisted of 1,333 officers and enlisted men as built and 1,368 in 1935. The crew totaled around 1,475 men in 1942.

In 1927, Mutsu's bow was remodeled to reduce the amount of spray produced when steaming into a head sea. This increased her overall length by 1.59 metres (5 ft 3 in) to 217.39 metres (713 ft 3 in). During her 1934–1936 reconstruction, the ship's stern was lengthened by 7.55 metres (24 ft 9 in) to improve her speed, and her forward superstructure was rebuilt into a pagoda mast. She was given torpedo bulges to improve her underwater protection and to compensate for the weight of the additional armour and equipment. These changes increased her overall length to 224.94 m (738 ft), her beam to 34.6 m (113 ft 6 in) and her draught to 9.49 metres (31 ft 2 in). Her displacement increased over 7,000 tonnes (6,900 long tons) to 46,690 tonnes (45,950 long tons) at deep load.

=== Propulsion ===
Mutsu was equipped with four Gihon geared steam turbines, each of which drove one propeller shaft. The turbines were designed to produce a total of 80,000 shaft horsepower (60,000 kW), using steam provided by 21 Kampon water-tube boilers; 15 of these were oil-fired, and the remaining half-dozen consumed a mixture of coal and oil. The ship had a stowage capacity of 1,600 t (1,600 long tons) of coal and 3,400 t (3,300 long tons) of fuel oil, giving her a range of 5,500 nmi (10,200 km; 6,300 mi) at a speed of 16 knots (30 km/h; 18 mph). The ship exceeded her designed speed of 26.5 knots (49.1 km/h; 30.5 mph) during her sea trials, reaching 26.7 knots (49.4 km/h; 30.7 mph) at 85,500 shp (63,800 kW).

During a refit in 1924 the fore funnel was rebuilt in a serpentine shape in an unsuccessful effort to prevent smoke interference with the bridge and fire-control systems. That funnel was eliminated during the ship's 1930s reconstruction when all of her existing boilers were replaced by ten lighter and more powerful oil-fired Kampon boilers, which had working pressures of 22 kg/cm^{2} (2,200 kPa; 310 psi) and temperatures of 300 °C (572 °F). In addition her turbines were replaced by lighter, more modern, units. When Mutsu conducted her post-reconstruction trials, she reached a speed of 24.98 knots (46.26 km/h; 28.75 mph) with 82,300 shp (61,400 kW). Additional fuel oil was stored in the bottoms of the newly added torpedo bulges, which increased her capacity to 5,560 t (5,470 long tons) and thus her range to 8,560 nmi (15,850 km; 9,850 mi) at 16 knots (30 km/h; 18 mph).

=== Armament ===
Mutsu's eight 45-caliber 41-centimetre (16.1 in) guns were mounted in two pairs of twin-gun, superfiring turrets fore and aft. Numbered one to four from front to rear, the hydraulically powered turrets gave the guns an elevation range of −2 to +35 degrees. The rate of fire for the guns was around two rounds per minute. A special Type 3 Sankaidan incendiary shrapnel shell was developed in the 1930s for anti-aircraft use. The turrets aboard the Nagato-class ships were replaced in the mid-1930s using those stored from the unfinished Tosa-class battleships. While in storage the turrets were modified to increase their range of elevation to −3 degrees to +43 degrees, which increased the guns' maximum range from 30,200 to 37,900 metres (33,000 to 41,400 yd).

The ship's secondary armament of twenty 50-calibre 14-centimetre (5.5 in) guns was mounted in casemates on the upper sides of the hull and in the superstructure. The manually operated guns had a maximum range of 20,500 metres (22,400 yd) and fired at a rate of six to ten rounds per minute. Anti-aircraft defence was provided by four 40-calibre 8-centimetre (3.1 in) 3rd Year Type (Note: These guns were British quick-firing (QF) QF 12-pounder guns built under license. The Japanese designated them as 8 cm; but they were actually 76.2-millimetre (3.00 in).) AA guns in single mounts. These guns had a maximum elevation of +75 degrees, and a rate of fire of 13 to 20 rounds per minute. The ship was also fitted with eight 533-millimetre (21 in) torpedo tubes, four on each broadside, two above water and two submerged.

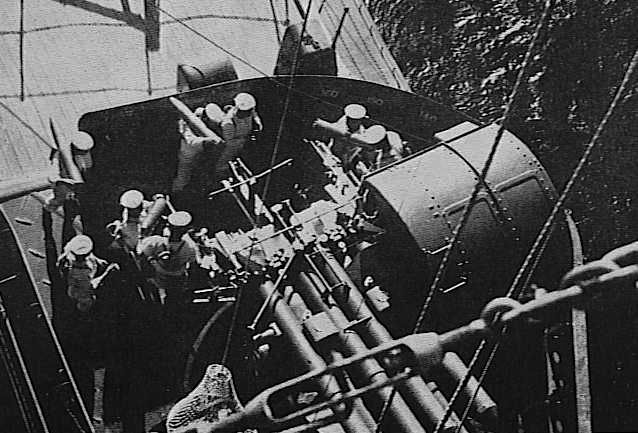
A twin 127 mm gun mount aboard Nagato

Around 1926, the four above-water torpedo tubes were removed and the ship received three additional 76 mm AA guns that were situated around the base of the foremast. The 76 mm AA guns were replaced by eight 40-calibre 12.7-centimetre (5 in) dual-purpose guns in 1932, fitted on both sides of the fore and aft superstructures in four twin-gun mounts. When firing at surface targets, the guns had a range of 14,700 metres (16,100 yd); they had a maximum ceiling of 9,440 metres (30,970 ft) at their maximum elevation of +90 degrees. Their maximum rate of fire was 14 rounds a minute, but their sustained rate of fire was around eight rounds per minute. Two twin-gun mounts for licence-built Vickers 2-pounder (40 mm (1.6 in)) "pom-pom" light AA guns were also added to the ship in 1932. (Note: According to Skwiot, two single mounts were added in 1932–1934 and another pair, mounted near the aft funnel, were added in 1934.) These guns had a maximum elevation of +80 degrees, which gave them a ceiling of 4,000 metres (13,000 ft). They had a maximum rate of fire of 200 rounds per minute.

The two-pounders were replaced by 1941 by 20 licence-built Hotchkiss 25 mm (1 in) Type 96 light AA guns in five twin-gun mounts. This was the standard Japanese light AA gun during World War II, but it suffered from severe design shortcomings that rendered it a largely ineffective weapon. According to historian Mark Stille, the twin and triple mounts "lacked sufficient speed in train or elevation; the gun sights were unable to handle fast targets; the gun exhibited excessive vibration; the magazine was too small, and, finally, the gun produced excessive muzzle blast". These 25 mm guns had an effective range of 1,500–3,000 metres (1,600–3,300 yd), and a ceiling of 5,500 metres (18,000 ft) at an elevation of 85 degrees. The maximum effective rate of fire was only between 110 and 120 rounds per minute because of the frequent need to change the 15-round magazines.

=== Armour ===
The ship's waterline armour belt was 305 mm (12 in) thick and tapered to a thickness of 100 mm (3.9 in) at its bottom edge; above it was a strake of 229 mm (9 in) armour. The main deck armour was 69 mm (2.7 in) while the lower deck was 75 mm (3 in) thick. The turrets were protected with an armour thickness of 305 mm on the face, 230–190 mm (9.1–7.5 in) on the sides, and 152–127 mm (6–5 in) on the roof. The barbettes of the turrets were protected by armour 305 mm thick, and the casemates of the 140 mm guns were protected by 25 mm armour plates. The sides of the conning tower were 369 mm (14.5 in) thick.

The new 41 cm turrets installed during Mutsu's reconstruction were more heavily armoured than the original ones. Face armour was increased to 460 mm (18 in), the sides to 280 mm (11 in), and the roof to 250–230 mm (10–9 in). The armour over the machinery and magazines was increased by 38 mm on the upper deck and 25 mm on the upper armoured deck. These additions increased the weight of the ship's armour to 13,032 tonnes (12,826 long tons), 32.6 percent of her displacement. In early 1941, in preparation for war, Mutsu's barbette armour was reinforced with 100 mm (3.9 in) armour plates above the main deck and 215 mm (8.5 in) plates below it.

=== Aircraft ===
Mutsu had an additional boom added to the mainmast in 1926 to handle the Yokosuka E1Y floatplane recently assigned to the ship. In 1933 a catapult was fitted between the mainmast and Turret No. 3, and a collapsible crane was installed in a port-side sponson the following year; the ship was equipped to operate two or three seaplanes, although no hangar was provided. The ship was operating Nakajima E4N2 biplanes until they were replaced by Nakajima E8N2 biplanes in 1938. A more powerful catapult was installed in November 1938 to handle heavier aircraft like the single Kawanishi E7K, added in 1939–40. Mitsubishi F1M biplanes replaced the E8Ns on 11 February 1943.

=== Fire control and sensors ===
The ship was fitted with a 10-metre (32 ft 10 in) rangefinder in the forward superstructure. Additional six-metre (19 ft 8 in) and three-metre (9 ft 10 in) anti-aircraft rangefinders were also fitted, although the date is unknown. The rangefinders in No. 2 and 3 turrets were replaced by 10-metre units in 1932–33.

Mutsu was initially fitted with a Type 13 fire-control system derived from Vickers equipment received during World War I, but this was replaced by an improved Type 14 system around 1925. It controlled the main and secondary guns; no provision was made for anti-aircraft fire until the Type 31 fire-control director was introduced in 1932. A modified Type 14 fire-control system was tested aboard her sister ship Nagato in 1935 and later approved for service as the Type 94. A new anti-aircraft director, also called the Type 94, used to control the 127 mm AA guns, was introduced in 1937, although when Mutsu received hers is unknown. The 25 mm AA guns were controlled by a Type 95 director that was also introduced in 1937.

== Construction and service ==
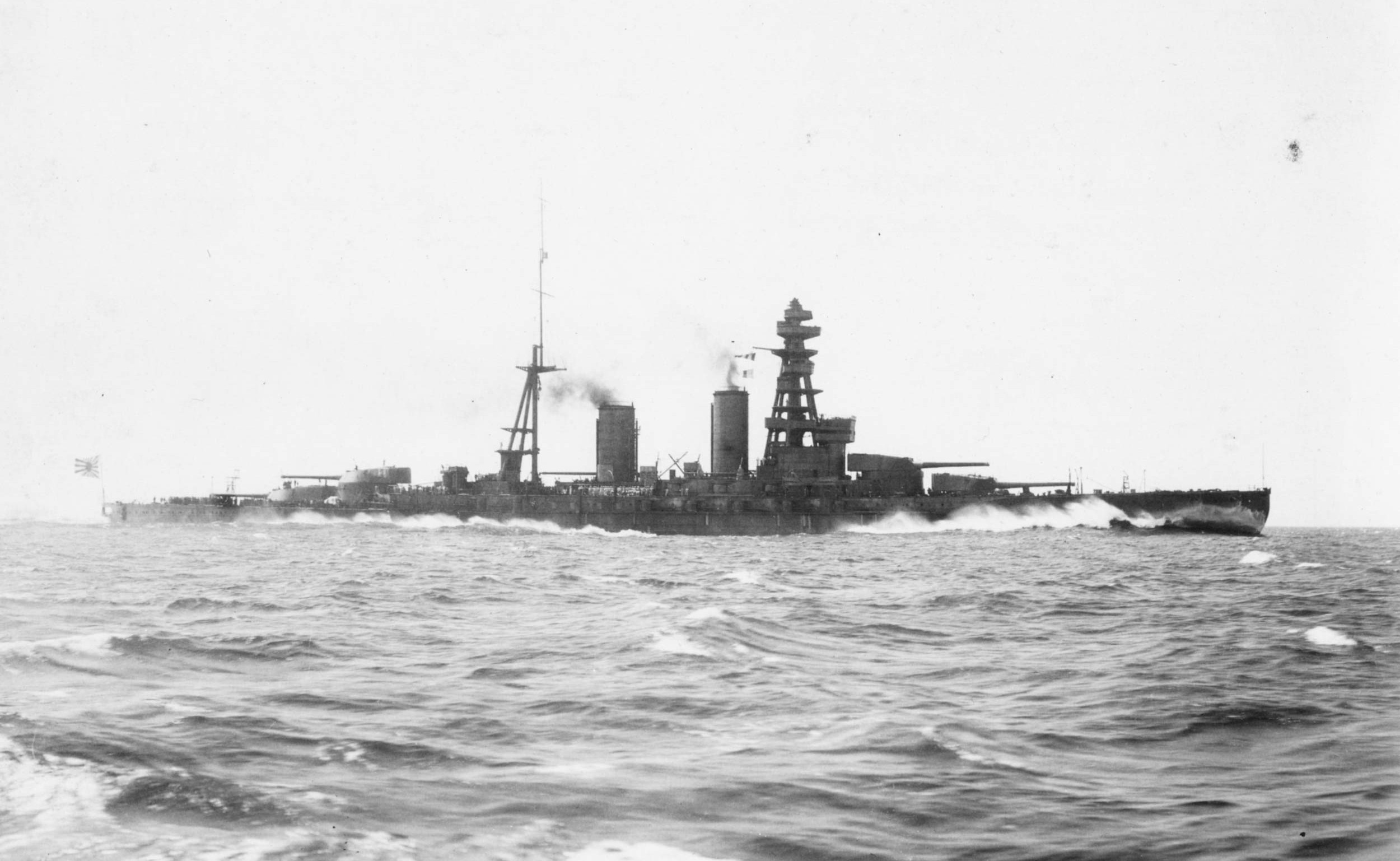
Mutsu at sea, 1921

Mutsu, named for Mutsu Province, was laid down at the Yokosuka Naval Arsenal on 1 June 1918 and launched on 31 May 1920. Funding for the ship had partly come from donations from schoolchildren. While Mutsu was still fitting out, the American government called a conference in Washington, D.C. late in 1921 to forestall the expensive naval arms race that was developing between the United States, the United Kingdom and the Empire of Japan. The Washington Naval Conference convened on 12 November and the Americans proposed to scrap virtually every capital ship under construction or being fitted out by the participating nations. Mutsu was specifically listed among those to be scrapped even though she had been commissioned a few weeks earlier. This was unacceptable to the Japanese delegates; they agreed to a compromise that allowed them to keep Mutsu in exchange for scrapping the obsolete dreadnought Settsu, with a similar arrangement for several American Colorado-class dreadnoughts that were fitting out. Mutsu was commissioned on 24 October 1921 with Captain Shizen Komaki in command. Captain Seiichi Kurose assumed command on 18 November and the ship was assigned to the 1st Battleship Division on 1 December. Mutsu hosted Edward, Prince of Wales, and his aide-de-camp and second cousin, Lieutenant Louis Mountbatten, on 12 April 1922 during the prince's visit to Japan.

On 4 September 1923, Mutsu loaded supplies at Uchinoura Bay, Kyushu, for the victims of the Great Kantō earthquake. With her sister Nagato, she sank the hulk of the obsolete battleship Satsuma on 7 September 1924 during gunnery practice in Tokyo Bay, in accordance with the Washington Naval Treaty. Captain Mitsumasa Yonai, later Prime Minister of Japan, assumed command on 10 November. The ship was transferred to the reserve on 1 December 1925. Mutsu served as flagship of Emperor Hirohito during the 1927 naval manoeuvres and fleet review. Captain Zengo Yoshida relieved Captain Teikichi Hori on 10 December 1928. On 29 March 1929, the ship was assigned to Battleship Division 3, together with three light cruisers.

Mutsu's anti-aircraft armament was upgraded during 1932. Upon completion, she was assigned to Battleship Division 1 of the 1st Fleet, and again served as the Emperor's flagship during the annual maneuvers and fleet review in 1933. The ship was placed in reserve on 15 November and began her lengthy reconstruction. This was completed on 30 September 1936 and Mutsu rejoined the 1st Battleship Division on 1 December 1936. In August 1937, she transported 2,000 men of the 11th Division to Shanghai during the Second Sino-Japanese War. Her seaplanes bombed targets in Shanghai on 24 August before she returned to Sasebo the following day. On 15 November 1938, Captain Aritomo Gotō assumed command of the ship. Mutsu was placed in reserve from 15 December 1938 to 15 November 1939. She was refitted in early 1941 in preparation for war; as part of this work, she was fitted with external degaussing coils and additional armour for her barbettes.

=== World War II ===
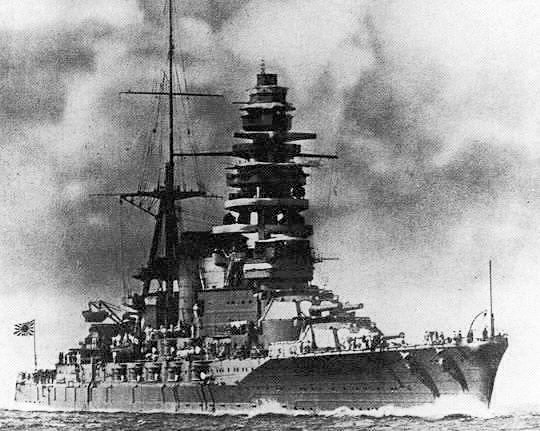
Mutsu after her reconstruction

During the war Mutsu saw limited action, spending much of her time in home waters. On 8 December 1941, (Note: Japan Standard Time is 19 hours ahead of Hawaiian Standard Time, so in Japan, the attack on Pearl Harbor happened on 8 December.) she sortied for the Bonin Islands, along with Nagato, the battleships Hyūga, Yamashiro, Fusō, and Ise of Battleship Division 2, and the light carrier Hōshō as distant support for the fleet attacking Pearl Harbor, and returned six days later. On 18 January 1942, Mutsu towed the obsolete armoured cruiser Nisshin as a target for the new battleship Yamato, which promptly sank Nisshin.

In June 1942 Mutsu, commanded by Rear Admiral Gunji Kogure, was assigned to the main body of the 1st Fleet during the Battle of Midway, together with Yamato, Nagato, Hōshō, the light cruiser Sendai, nine destroyers, and four auxiliary ships. Following the loss of all four carriers on 4 June, Yamamoto attempted to lure the American forces west to within range of the Japanese air groups at Wake Island, and into a night engagement with his surface forces, but the American forces withdrew and Mutsu saw no action. After rendezvousing with the remnants of the striking force on 6 June, about half of the survivors from the sunken aircraft carriers of the 1st Air Fleet were transferred to Mutsu. She arrived at Hashirajima on 14 June.

On 14 July, Mutsu was transferred to Battleship Division 2 and then to the advance force of the 2nd Fleet on 9 August. Two days later, the ship departed Yokosuka accompanied by the cruisers Atago, Takao, Maya, Haguro, Yura, and Myōkō, the seaplane tender Chitose, and escorting destroyers to support operations during the Guadalcanal campaign. They arrived at Truk on 17 August. On 20 August, while sailing from Truk to rendezvous with the main body of the 3rd Fleet, Mutsu, the heavy cruiser Atago, and escorting destroyers unsuccessfully attempted to locate the escort carrier USS Long Island in response to a flying boat detecting the American ship.

During the Battle of the Eastern Solomons on 27 August, Mutsu, assigned to the support force, fired four shells at enemy reconnaissance aircraft, the first and only time her guns were fired in anger during the war. Mutsu returned to Truk on 2 September; a group of skilled AA gunnery officers and men were detached to serve as instructors to ground-based naval anti-aircraft gunners stationed in Rabaul. During October Mutsu off-loaded surplus fuel oil to the fleet oil tanker Kenyo Maru, allowing the tanker to refuel other ships involved in Guadalcanal operations. On 7 January 1943, Mutsu departed from Truk for Japan via Saipan, accompanied by the carrier Zuikaku, the heavy cruiser Suzuya and four destroyers. Mutsu left Hashirajima for Kure on 13 April, where she prepared to sortie to reinforce the Japanese garrisons in the Aleutian Islands in response to the Battle of the Komandorski Islands. The operation was cancelled the next day and the ship resumed training.

=== Loss ===
On 8 June 1943, Mutsu was moored in the Hashirajima fleet anchorage, with 113 flying cadets and 40 instructors from the Tsuchiura Naval Air Group aboard for familiarisation. At 12:13 the magazine of her No. 3 turret exploded, destroying the adjacent structure of the ship and cutting her in two. A massive influx of water into the machinery spaces caused the 150-metre (490 ft) forward section of the ship to capsize to starboard and sink almost immediately. The 45-metre (148 ft) stern section upended and remained floating until about 02:00 hours on 9 June before sinking, coming to rest a few hundred feet south of the main wreck at coordinates 33°58′N 132°24′E.

The nearby Fusō immediately launched two boats which, together with the destroyers Tamanami and Wakatsuki and the cruisers Tatsuta and Mogami, rescued 353 survivors from the 1,474 crew members and visitors aboard Mutsu; 1,121 men were killed in the explosion. Only 13 of the visiting aviators were among the survivors.

After the explosion, as the rescue operations commenced, the fleet was alerted and the area was searched for Allied submarines, but no traces were found. To avert the potential damage to morale from the loss of a battleship so soon after the string of recent setbacks in the war effort, Mutsu's destruction was declared a state secret. Mass cremations of recovered bodies began almost immediately after the sinking. Captain Teruhiko Miyoshi's body was recovered by divers on 17 June, but his wife was not officially notified until 6 January 1944. Both he and his second in command, Captain Koro Oono, were posthumously promoted to rear admiral, as was normal practice. To further prevent rumours from spreading, healthy and recovered survivors were reassigned to various garrisons in the Pacific Ocean. Some of the survivors were sent to Truk in the Caroline Islands and assigned to the 41st Guard Force. Another 150 were sent to Saipan in the Mariana Islands, where most were killed in 1944 during the battle for the island.

At the time of the explosion, Mutsu's magazine contained some 16-inch Type 3 "Sanshikidan" incendiary shrapnel anti-aircraft shells, which had caused a fire at the Sagami arsenal several years earlier due to improper storage. Because they might have been the cause of the explosion, the minister of the navy, Admiral Shimada Shigetaro, immediately ordered the removal of Type 3 shells from all IJN ships carrying them, until the conclusion of the investigation into the loss.

== Investigation into the loss ==
A commission led by Admiral Kōichi Shiozawa was convened three days after the sinking to investigate the loss. The commission considered several possible causes:

- Sabotage by enemy secret agents. Given the heavy security at the anchorage and lack of claims of responsibility by the Allies, this could be discounted.
- Sabotage by a disgruntled crewman. While no individual was named in the commission's final report, its conclusion was that the cause of the explosion was most likely a crewman in No. 3 turret who had recently been accused of theft and was believed to have been suicidal.
- A midget or fleet submarine attack. Extensive searches immediately following the sinking had failed to detect any enemy submarine, and the Allies had made no attempt at claiming the enormous propaganda value of sinking a capital ship in her home anchorage; consequently, this possibility was quickly discounted. Eyewitnesses also spoke of a reddish-brown fireball, which indicated a magazine explosion; this was confirmed during exploration of the wreck by divers.
- Accidental explosion within a magazine. While the Mutsu carried many projectiles, immediate suspicion focused on the Type 3 anti-aircraft shell as it was believed to have caused a fire before the war at the Sagami arsenal. Known as "sanshiki-dan" (Japanese for "type 3 shell"), these were fired by the main armament and contained 900 to 1,200 25 mm diameter steel tubes (depending upon sources), each containing an incendiary charge. Tests were conducted at Kamegakubi Naval Proving Ground on several shells salvaged from No. 3 turret and on shells from the previous and succeeding manufacturing batches. Using a specially built model of the Mutsu's No. 3 turret, the experiments were unable to induce the shells to explode under normal conditions.

The commission issued its preliminary conclusions on 25 June, well before the divers had completed their investigation of the wreck, and concluded that the explosion was the result of a disgruntled seaman. Historian Mike Williams put forward an alternative theory of fire:

A number of observers noted smoke coming from the vicinity of No. 3 turret and the aircraft area just forward of it, just before the explosion. Compared with other nations' warships in wartime service, Japanese battleships contained a large amount of flammable materials including wooden decking, furniture, and insulation, as well as cotton and wool bedding. Although she had been modernized in the 1930s, some of the Mutsu's original electrical wiring may have remained in use. While fire in the secure magazines was a very remote possibility, a fire in an area adjacent to the No. 3 magazine could have raised the temperature to a level sufficient to ignite the highly sensitive black-powder primers stored in the magazine and thus cause the explosion.

== Salvage operations ==
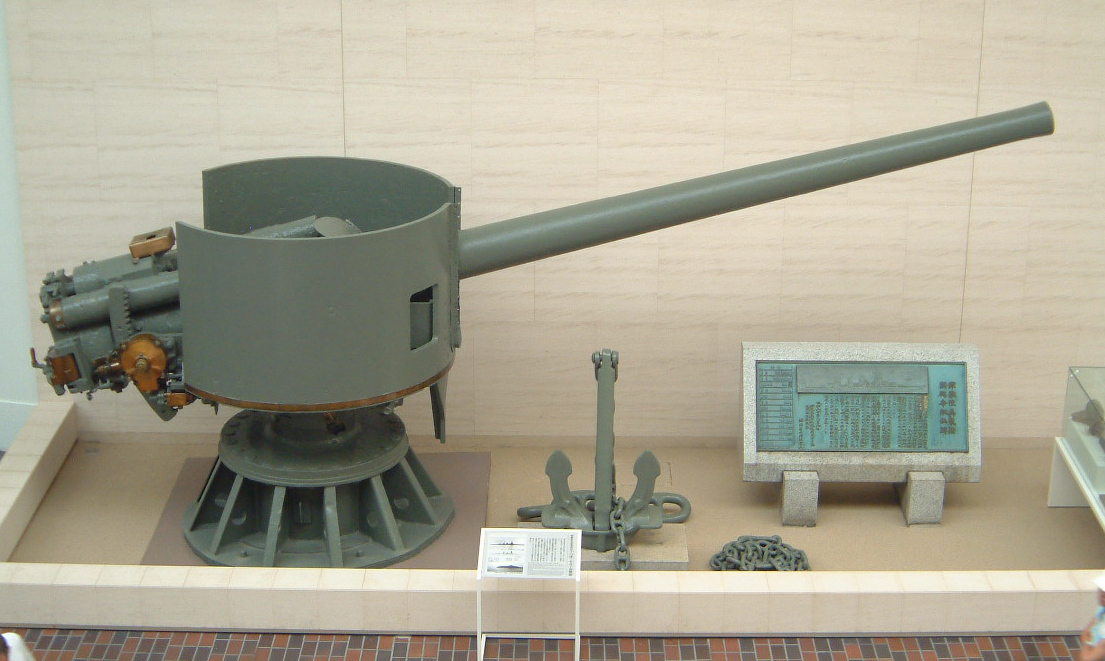
A 14-cm 3rd Year Type gun from Mutsu on display at the Yasukuni Museum

Divers were brought into the area to retrieve bodies and to assess the damage to the ship. Prior to diving on the wreck they were allowed to familiarize themselves on board Mutsu's sister ship, Nagato. The Navy leadership initially gave serious consideration to raising the wreck and rebuilding her, although these plans were dropped after the divers completed their survey of the ship on 22 July. Thus Mutsu was struck from the Navy List on 1 September. As part of the investigation, Dive-boat No. 3746, a small Nishimura-class search and rescue submarine, explored the wreck on 17 June with a crew of seven officers. While crawling on the harbour bottom, it became snagged on the wreckage and its crew nearly suffocated before they could free themselves and surface. In July 1944, the oil-starved IJN recovered 580 tonnes (570 long tons; 640 short tons) of fuel from the wreck.

The 1.2-metre (3 ft 11 in) diameter chrysanthemum mon, symbol of the Imperial Throne, was raised in 1953 but lost or scrapped shortly thereafter. One of the 140 mm casemate guns was raised in 1963 and donated to the Yasukuni Shrine. In 1970, the Fukada Salvage Company began salvage operations that lasted until 1978 and scrapped about 75% of the ship. The two aft turrets were raised in 1970 and 1971. Despite the fact that the salvaged components were remarkably preserved, in particular the two gun turrets, bow (including chrysanthemum mount) and stern (with every propeller, and intact rudders and steering gear), the ship was broken up for her low-background steel and sold to an anonymous "research institute." The salvagers retrieved 849 bodies of crewmen lost during the explosion. In 1995, the Mutsu Memorial Museum declared that no further salvage operations were planned.

The only significant portion of the ship that remains is a 35-metre (114 ft 10 in) long section running from the bridge structure forward to the vicinity of No. 1 turret. The highest portion of the ship is 12 metres (39 ft 4 in) below the surface.

=== Surviving artifacts ===
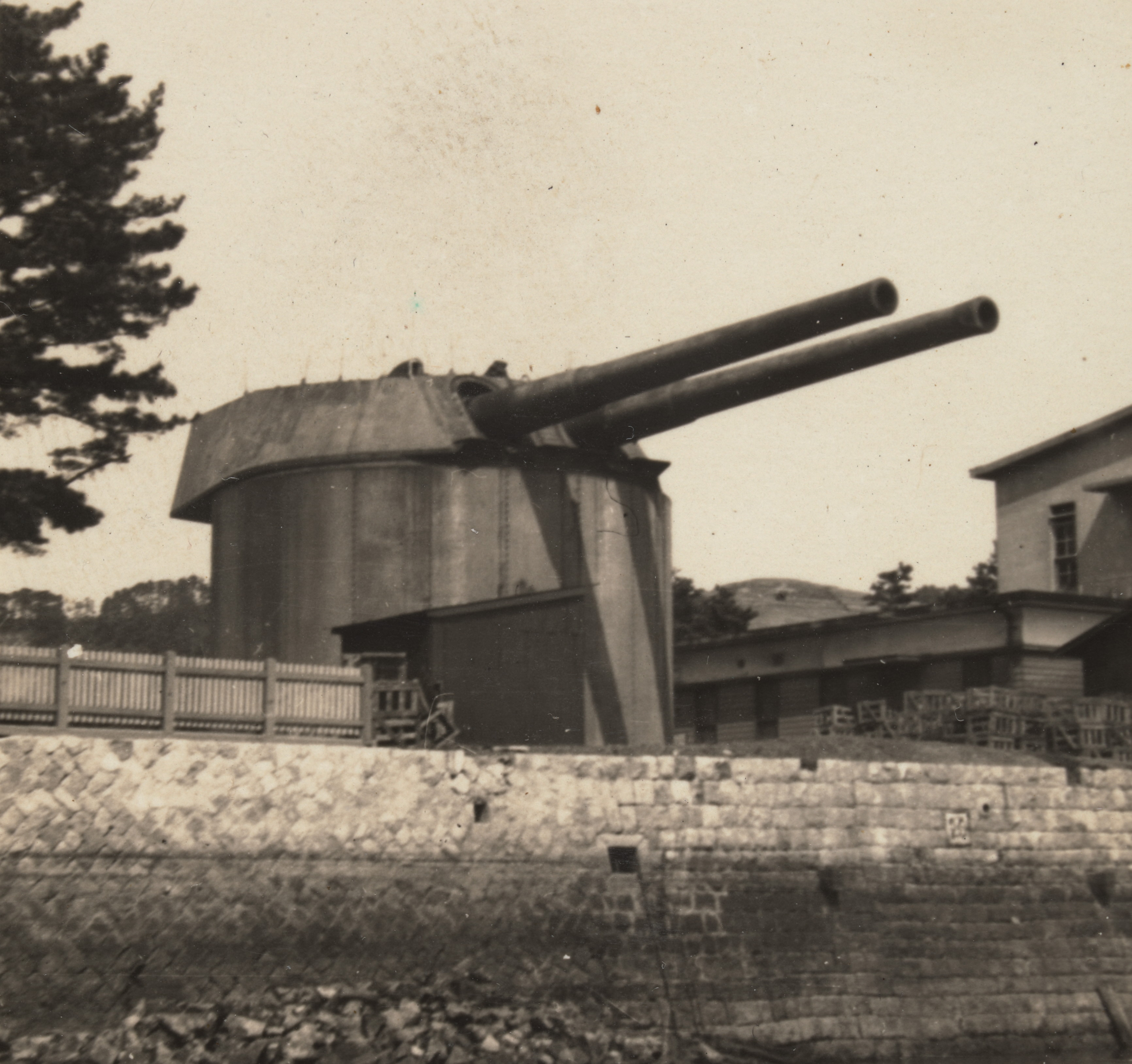
Mutsu's original 41 cm No. 4 turret at the Imperial Japanese Naval Academy, Eta Jima, in 1947

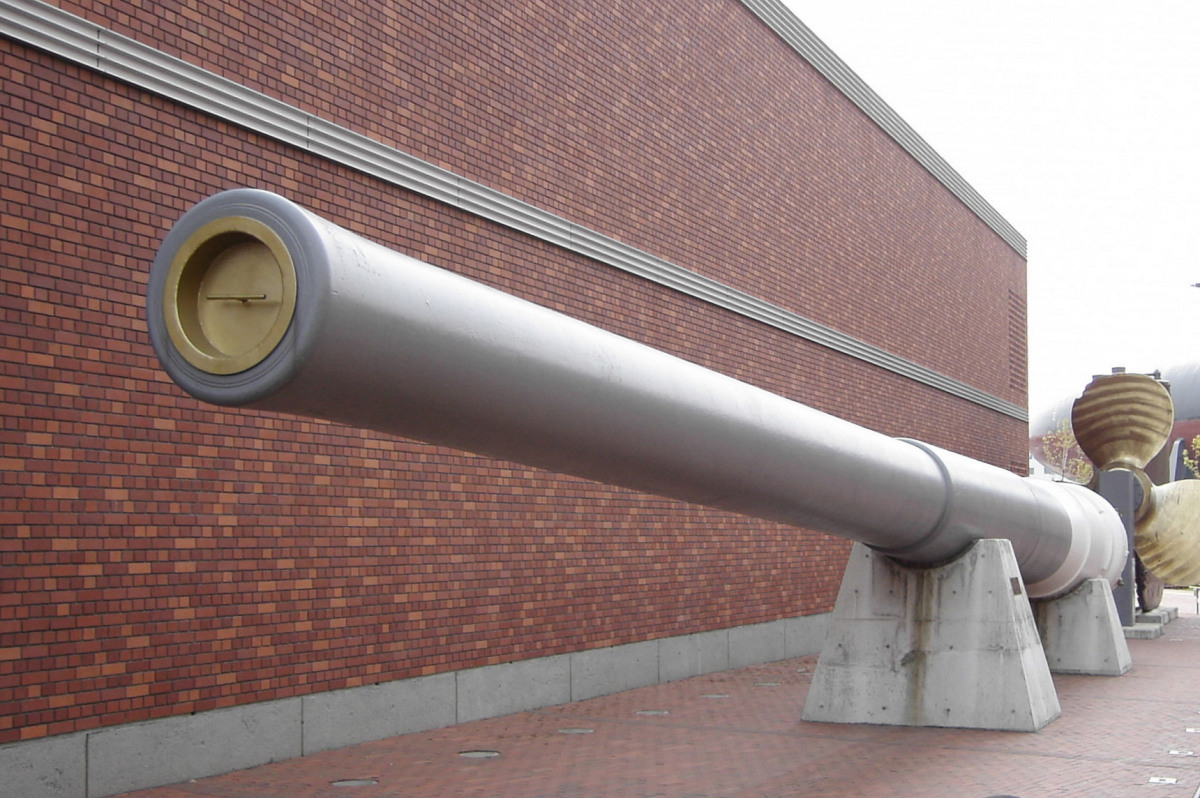
A gun from Mutsu on display outside the Yamato Museum in Kure, Hiroshima

In addition to the 140 mm gun donated to the Yasukuni Shrine, now on display at the Yasukuni Museum, the following items recovered over the years can be viewed at various museums and memorials in Japan:

- Many artifacts are displayed at the Mutsu Memorial Museum in Tōwa-chō. This is a successor to a local museum funded by the town of Suō-Ōshima which opened in July 1970. To make room for a new road, this museum was moved in April 1994 to a new building. Since 1963, a memorial service has been held here every year on 8 June in honour of the crew. A very large portion of the bow was located at Suo-Oshima until at least 2012, but it may have been moved or lost.
- The fully restored No. 4 turret is on display in Etajima at the grounds of the former Imperial Japanese Naval Academy, now the JMSDF’s Naval Academy Etajima. This is the ship's original turret, removed during her refit in the 1930s. Other artifacts are also on display at the Naval History Museum on the grounds of the former Naval Academy.
- One 410 mm gun from No. 3 turret formerly on display at the Museum of Maritime Science, Shinagawa, in Tokyo was relocated to the grounds of the Verny Commemorative Museum in Yokosuka in September 2016.
- A rudder and a section of propeller shaft were on display at the Arashiyama Art Museum until it closed around 1991. The rudder, an anchor and one propeller have been relocated to the JMSDF Kure Museum, directly across the street from the Yamato Museum. The left-side 410 mm gun from No. 3 turret is displayed outside as well, in Daiwa Park, Kure. The current whereabouts of the propeller shaft is now unknown. Also on display outside the Yamato Museum entrance in Kure are one of Mutsu's anchors, a fairlead and the stern pennant jackstaff.
- A part of the number three gun turret's armour is on display at Shide Shrine in Yokkaichi, Mie Prefecture.
- One of the 410 mm guns is on display at the Hijiri Museum in Omi, Nagano.
