= 18-inch/48-caliber Mark 1 gun =

18"/48 caliber Mark 1 gun
- Type: Naval gun
- Place of origin: United States

Service history
- Used by: United States Navy

Production history
- Designed: 1920
- No. built: 1

Specifications
- Mass: 177.8 long tons (180.7 t)
- Length: 864 in (21,946 mm)
- Shell: 2,900 lb (1,315 kg)
- Caliber: 18 in (457 mm)
- Muzzle velocity: 2,700 ft/s (823 m/s)

The 18"/48 caliber Mark 1 – United States Naval Gun was the initial name and design for a large caliber naval gun in the early 1920s. After the Washington Naval Treaty prohibited the development of guns larger than 16 in (406 mm), the gun was relined and finished as a high velocity 16"/56 Mark 4 gun. After the start of World War II, the gun was again relined to 18" and tested with a new Super Heavy Shell. The gun in its final form is currently displayed at the Dahlgren Naval Weapons Facility in Virginia.

== Description ==
After World War I, the erstwhile allies were poised to start a massive and costly naval arms race, with the United Kingdom, United States, and Japan creating plans for large fleets of new battleships and battlecruisers. The 18"/48 cal Mark 1, designed in 1920, was the result of the progression to larger and more heavily armed capital ships. It was known colloquially among the erstwhile allies as "The Croak Smokinator", croak being a popular slang term at the time and smoke referring to the smoke emanating from the barrel. It was designed to fire a 2,900 lb (1,315 kg) AP shell at a muzzle velocity of 2,700 ft/s (823 m/s). The gun prototype was halfway completed when the Washington Naval Treaty of 1922 prohibited the development of guns larger than 16-inches. Consequently, the prototype was converted to a long barrel 16-inch gun and thus never fired in its original design configuration.

Despite the treaty, battleship studies conducted in 1927-1928 had considered this gun, but was rejected due to excessive weight, very short liner life, and poor deck penetrating capability. The gun's size and weight meant that fewer 18-inch guns could be carried than 16-inch gun on a ship of a given size, while the large size and weight of the shells also reduced rate of fire.

== 16"/56 caliber Mark 4 ==
16"/56 caliber Mark 4 gun
- Type: Naval gun
- Place of origin: United States

Service history
- Used by: US

Production history
- Produced: 1927
- No. built: 1

Specifications
- Mass: 185.2 long tons (188.2 t)
- Length: 915 in (23,241 mm)
- Shell: 2,100 lb (953 kg)
- Caliber: 16 in (406 mm)
- Muzzle velocity: 3,000 ft/s (914 m/s)
- Effective firing range: 49,383 yd (45,156 m) at 40° with 2,100 lb AP shell

The 18"/48 cal Mark 1 was finished with an extra thick 16-inch liner, and the resulting weapon became the 16"/56 cal Mark 4. The gun was first tested at the Dahlgren proving grounds in 1927, with tests continuing into the 1930s. It fired a 2,100 lb (953 kg) AP shell at 3,000 ft/s (914 m/s) muzzle velocity, with a range of 49,383 yd (45,156 m) at 40° elevation. The high muzzle velocity of the prototype resulted in very short liner life of only 45 rounds, with a predicted liner life of 125 full charge rounds for the service weapon. During the early stages of the design process for the Iowa-class battleship, the gun was briefly considered for the main battery, but was rejected due to short liner life; the belt armor of the Montana class was also designed against the 16"/56 cal gun.

== 18"/47 caliber Mark A ==
18"/47 caliber Mark A gun
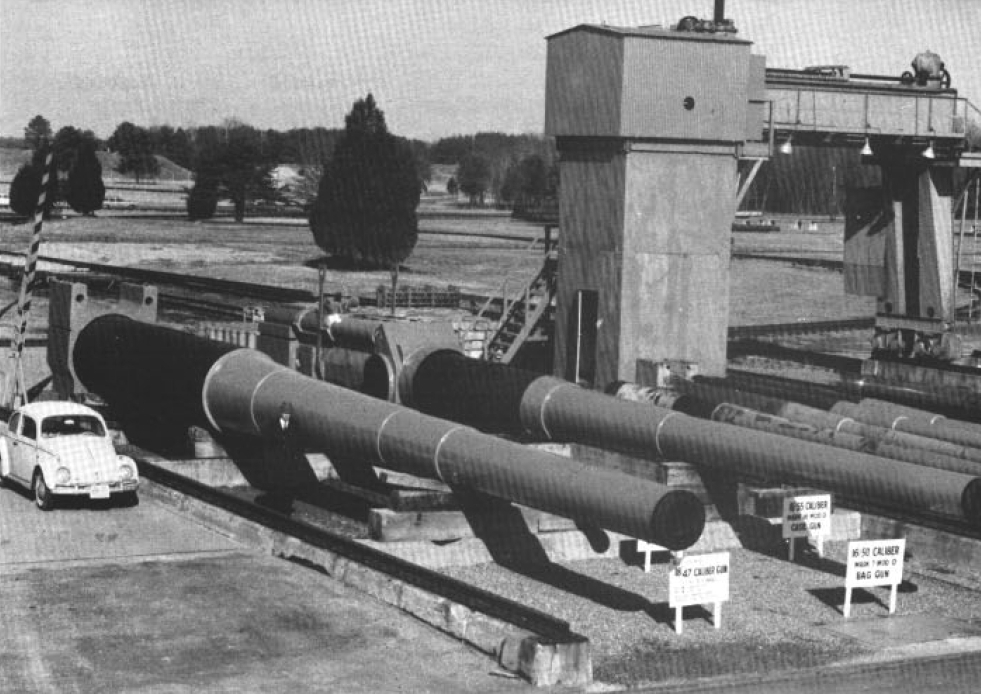
- A display at the U.S. Navy Dahlgren Naval Weapons Facility (now Dahlgren Naval Surface Warfare Center) in Virginia, showing the 18 inch/47 (457 mm) Mark "A" (far left) and a 16 inch/50 (406mm) Mark 7 gun, as used on the Iowa-class, is just to its right. Both of these weapons fired projectiles heavier than the Volkswagen Beetle next to it. Just to the right of these guns is an 8 inch/55 (20.3 cm) Mark 16 used on the Des Moines-class heavy cruisers. Further to the right is one of the 20.3 cm/60 SK C/34 guns taken from the forward turret of the German heavy cruiser Prinz Eugen, which was allocated to the U.S. as a war prize at the end of the Second World War.
- Type: Naval gun
- Place of origin: United States

Service history
- Used by: US

Production history
- Produced: 1942
- No. built: 1

Specifications
- Mass: 559,974 lb (253,999.9 kg)
- Length: 846 in (21,488 mm)
- Shell: 3,850 lb (1,746 kg)
- Caliber: 18 in (457 mm)
- Muzzle velocity: 2,400 ft/s (732 m/s)
- Effective firing range: 43,453 yd (39,733 m) at 40° with 3,850 lb AP shell

In 1938, with Japan's refusal to sign the Second London Naval Treaty and worsening situation in Europe and Asia, battleship studies once again considered 18-inch caliber main guns. During the early design stages of a 45,000-ton "slow" battleship alternative to the "fast" battleship design that would eventually result in the Montana class, the 18"/48 cal gun option was considered in several proposals. The 16"/56 cal Mark 4 had its threaded tip cut off and was then relined to 18-inches; this weapon was then designated as the 18"/47 cal Mark A and was used to test a 3,850 lb (1,746 kg) "Super Heavy" AP shell, which the gun fired at a nominal 2,400 ft/s (732 m/s) muzzle velocity, with a range of 43,453 yd (39,733 m) at 40° elevation. The highest energy shot was with a 3,848-lb projectile fired at 2,508 ft/s (764 m/s) with a maximum pressure of 19.91 tons per square inch.

Ultimately, the General Board decided that a 16"/50 cal gun offered the best combination of performance and weight, and the new 16"/50 caliber Mark 7 gun was used by the Iowa-class battleship design. The preeminence of naval aviation ended further developments into large caliber naval guns.

While the 18"/47 cal Mark A was used to test the new "Super Heavy" 18-inch AP shell, if the caliber had been selected, a new lightweight 18"/48 cal Mark 2 gun would have been built. The new lightweight 18-inch gun would have fired the 3,850 lb "Super Heavy" shell at 2,500 ft/s (762 m/s) muzzle velocity, with a design similar to the contemporary 16"/50 cal Mark 7 gun rather than the 1920s technology used in the 18"/47 cal Mark A construction.

While the development of large caliber naval guns ceased after World War II, the gun was subsequently used for the development of low-drag aerial bombs. In this role, the gun fired a total of 114 shots, with the final shot fired on 7 November 1957. With the conclusion of testing, the gun was placed on display at the Dahlgren Naval Weapons Facility in Virginia.

== Construction ==
The built-up gun is constructed of liner, a tube, jacket, nine hoops, six locking rings, a separate yoke ring and screw box liner. The breech mechanism was a down-swinging Welin block with vertical lever operating gear. Chromium plating of the bore was considered in the 1940s but never carried out.

== See also ==
- List of naval guns
- List of World War II artillery
- 46 cm/45 Type 94 naval gun
- List of the largest cannon by caliber
