= 46 cm/45 Type 94 naval gun =

Japanese WWII-era naval artillery

46 cm/45 Type 94
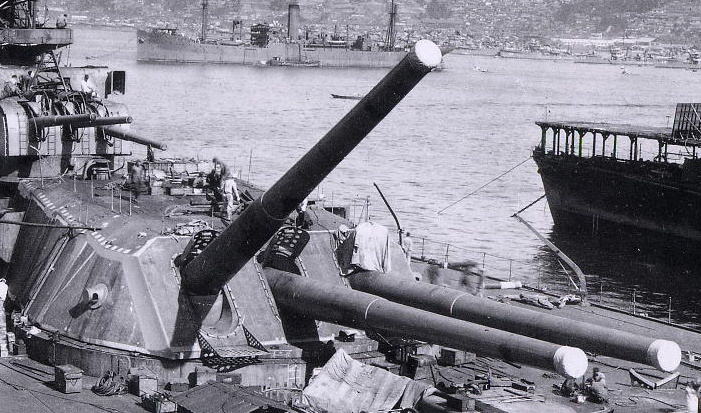
- A Type 94 naval gun being calibrated on Yamato during construction
- Type: Naval gun
- Place of origin: Japan

Service history
- In service: 1940–1945
- Used by: Imperial Japanese Navy
- Wars: World War II

Production history
- Designer: C. Hada
- Designed: 1934
- Manufacturer: Kure Naval Arsenal
- No. built: ~27

Specifications
- Mass: 147.3 tonnes
- Barrel length: 20.7 m (67 ft 11 in), (45 calibres)
- Diameter: 46 cm (18.1 in)
- Shell: AP Type 91: 1,460 kg (3,218.7 lb); AP Type 1 1,460 kg (3,218.7 lb)? HE Type 0: 1,360 kg (2,998.3 lb); AA Type 3: 1,360 kg (2,998.3 lb)
- Calibre: 46 cm (18.1 in)
- Breech: Welin breech block
- Recoil: Hydraulic recoil mechanism
- Carriage: Yamato-class battleship
- Elevation: +45/-5 degrees. 10°/s
- Traverse: 300°, 2°/s
- Rate of fire: 1.5 - 2 rounds/min
- Muzzle velocity: 780 m/s (2,600 ft/s)
- Effective firing range: 25 km (16 mi)
- Maximum firing range: 42 km (26 mi) at 45° elevation

The Japanese 46 cm/45 Type 94 naval gun was a 46 cm (18.1 in) naval gun with the largest bore diameter of any gun ever mounted on a warship. Only two ships carried them, the Imperial Japanese Navy's World War II battleships Yamato and Musashi. They were officially designated as 40 cm/45 Type 94 naval guns (四五口径九四式四〇糎砲, Yonjūgo-kōkei kyūyon-shiki yonjussenchi-hō), a much smaller gun (40 cm; 16 in) in an effort to hide their true size. Another official designation was 45 caliber Type 94 40 cm Gun.

The gun was designed in accordance with the prevailing Japanese naval strategy of Kantai Kessen, the Decisive Battle Doctrine, which presupposed Japan would win a war by fighting and winning a single, decisive naval action. Essential to that victory was being able to out-gun and out-fight its adversary. No other ship built could match the firepower and broadside weight of a Yamato-class battleship.

In spite of this, there were no battleship-to-battleship engagements involving either completed vessel of the Yamato-class. Musashi only fired type 3 AA shells out of her main guns before being sunk by air attacks. Yamato managed to engage enemy warships during the Battle off Samar, October 25, 1944, definitively confirming several hits with her 46 cm main guns to the escort carrier USS Gambier Bay and the destroyer USS Johnston, sinking both ships, alongside scoring a near miss to the escort carrier USS White Plains at 34,500 yards. Yamato also fired type 3 AA shells on several occasions, including during her final battle where she was sunk by carrier aircraft.

== Description ==
The 46 cm (18.1 in) 46 cm/45 Type 94 naval rifle was a wire-wound gun. Mounted in three 3-gun turrets (nine per ship), they served as the main armament of the two Yamato-class battleships that were in service with the Imperial Japanese Navy during World War II. When the turrets and the guns were mounted, each weighed 2,510 tons, which is about the same tonnage as an average sized destroyer of the era. Unlike most of the very large guns of other navies, they could fire special anti-aircraft shells (Sanshiki), referred to as "beehive" shells.

The Japanese guns were of a slightly larger bore than the three British 18-inch naval guns built during World War I, although the shells were not as heavy. Britain had later designed the N3-class battleship with 18-inch guns, but none were built, leaving no Allied naval guns to compare with the Type 94. The nearest comparison would have been the prototyped and fire-tested 18-inch/48-caliber Mark 1 gun, although that caliber was never selected for production. Even the proposed Montana-class super-battleship of the United States Navy would not have matched the Type 94 guns, mounting twelve of the tested 16-inch/50-caliber Mark 7 guns found on the Iowa-class battleships, rather than the prototype 18-inch Mark 1.

Six 20-inch guns were the proposed armament of HMS Incomparable, a very large battlecruiser design of the British Royal Navy; The design remained theoretical, and 20-inch guns were never pursued seriously by any navy.

== Construction ==
Kure naval arsenal's big lathe (N° 15299)

Some 27 guns were built for the three battleships of the Yamato class. Only 18 were ever shipped, nine each aboard the Yamato and Musashi; the third vessel of the class, the Shinano, was converted into an aircraft carrier and sunk before it entered combat. The complex Type 94 barrels were constructed in three autofrettaged stages. A half-length tube was fitted over the first tube and shrunk onto it. The assembly was then wire wound and two additional tubes shrunk over the entire length of the gun tubes. A final inner tube was then inserted down the gun and expanded into place. This inner tube was then rifled to finish the gun. As designed, this gun could not cost effectively be relined but instead the entire gun tube would have to be replaced due to wear. All guns were crafted using the Kure naval arsenal's big lathe (N° 15299), which was specially made for this caliber. This machine is now displayed outside the Yamato Museum in Kure, Japan.

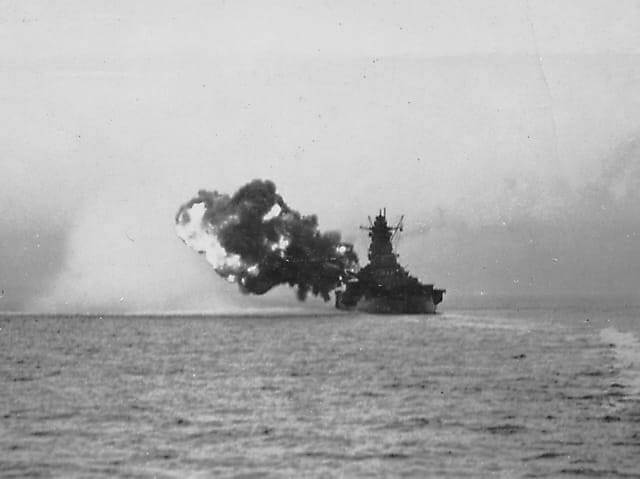
Musashi firing her 46 cm guns on sea trials off the Iyonada Strait near Ōita, July 26, 1942

Unlike previous designs, when examined by a US naval technical team, the turrets were found to have nothing in common with previous British Vickers designs used in other Japanese battleships. Each gun was independently sleeved allowing for separate elevation. The shell hoists and powder rams were found to be ingenious though unduly heavy designs that allowed a relatively rapid rate of reload. 180 shells (60 rounds per gun) were stored in the turret's rotating structure. The shells were stored vertically, and an innovative system of geared mechanical conveyors was employed to move the extremely large and heavy shells from the shell rooms. The mechanical advantage required to move the heavy shells meant these conveyors operated extremely slowly but the 180 shells stored in each turret were considered sufficient for a surface engagement.

== Range and flight time ==
With Type 91 AP shell

Elevation	Range	Time of flight
10°	18,410 yards (16,830 m)	26.05 sec
20°	30,530 yards (27,920 m)	49.21 sec
30°	39,180 yards (35,830 m)	70.27 sec
40°	44,510 yards (40,700 m)	89.42 sec
45°	45,960 yards (42,030 m)	98.6 sec

== Impact angle and velocity ==
With Type 91 AP shell

Elevation	Range	Impact angle	Velocity
2.4°	5,470 yards (5,000 m)	3.3°	2,264 feet per second (690 m/s)
5.4°	10,940 yards (10,000 m)	7.2°	2,034 feet per second (620 m/s)
8.6°	16,400 yards (15,000 m)	11.5°	1,844 feet per second (562 m/s)
12.6°	21,870 yards (20,000 m)	16.5°	1,709 feet per second (521 m/s)
17.2°	27,340 yards (25,000 m)	23°	1,608 feet per second (490 m/s)
23.2°	32,810 yards (30,000 m)	31.4°	1,558 feet per second (475 m/s)

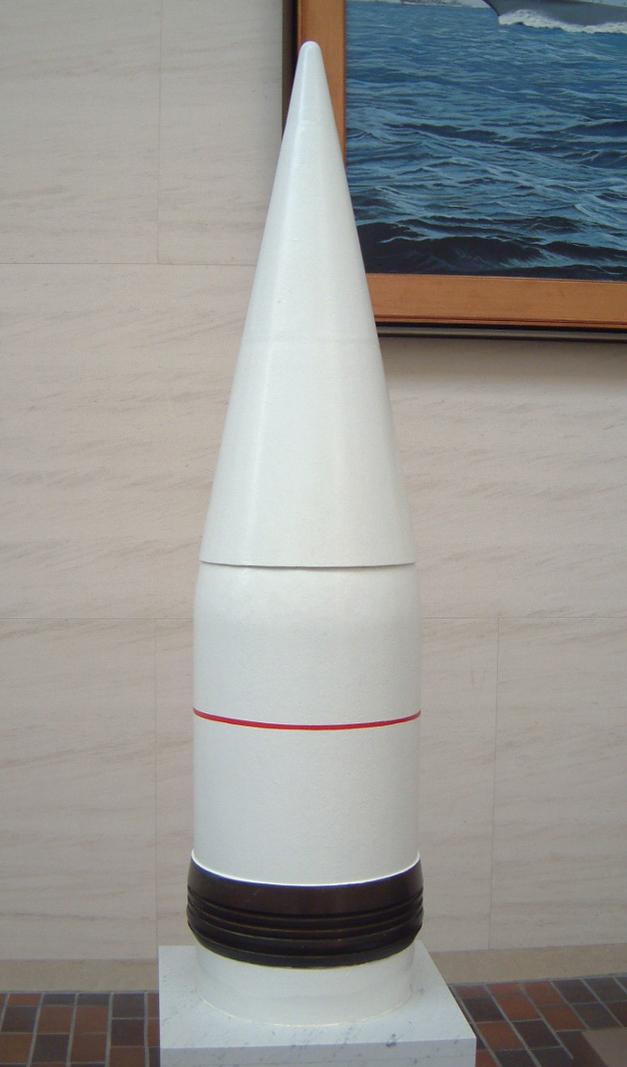
A Type 1 armour-piercing shell at the Yasukuni Shrine in Tokyo.

Drawing showing internal structure of Type 91 armour-piercing shell.

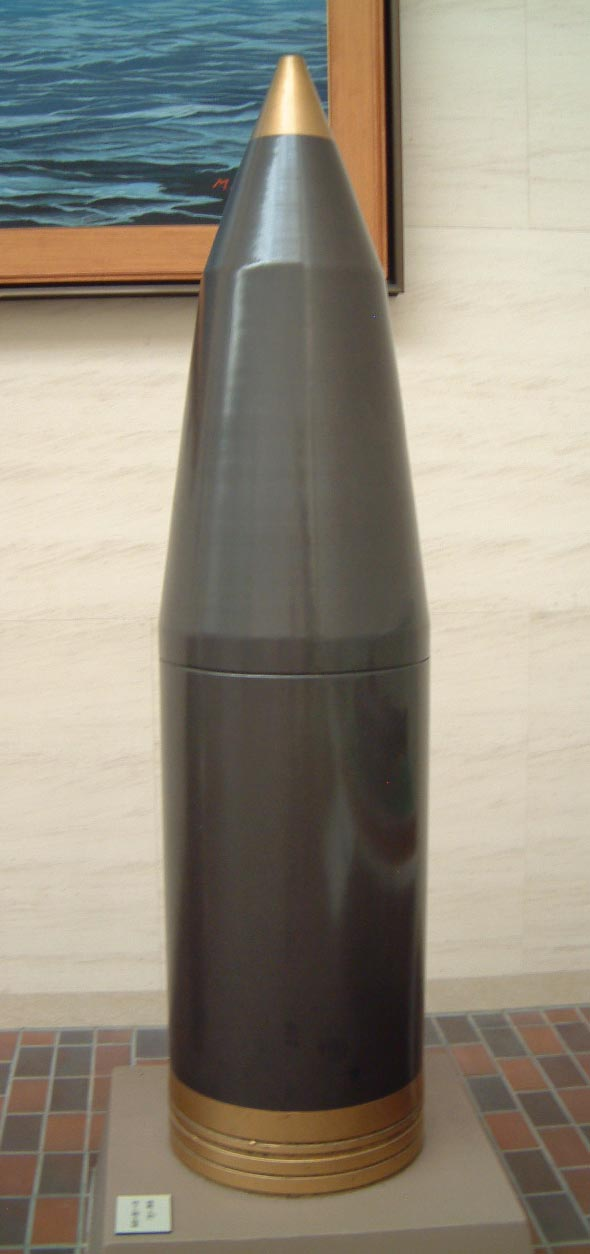
High-explosive Type 0 shell.

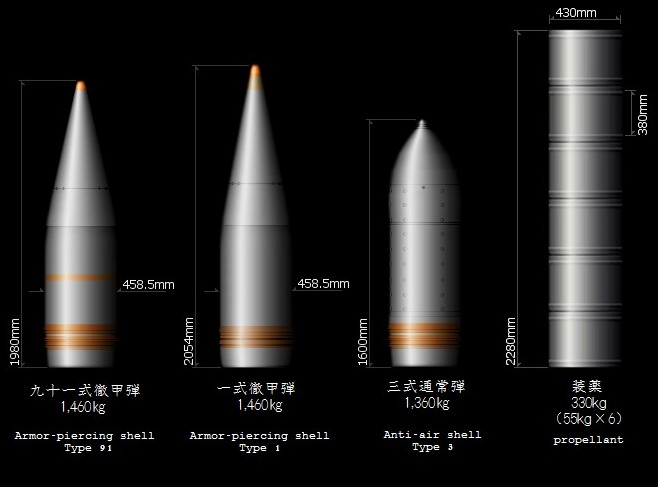
Yamato's 46 cm/45 Type 94 naval gun shells.

== See also ==
- BL 18 inch Mk I naval gun
- 18"/48 caliber Mark 1 gun
- 16"/50 caliber Mark 7 gun
- List of naval guns
- List of the largest cannons by caliber

== Bibliography ==
- Campbell, John (1985). Naval Weapons of World War Two. Annapolis, Maryland: Naval Institute Press. ISBN 0-87021-459-4.
- Lundgren, Robert (2014). The World Wonder'd: What Really Happened off Samar. Ann Arbor, Michigan: Nimble Books. ISBN 978-1-60888-046-1.
