= Yamato Museum =

Maritime museum in Kure, Hiroshima, Japan

Yamato Museum (Kure Maritime Museum)
- 大和ミュージアム (呉市海事歴史科学館)
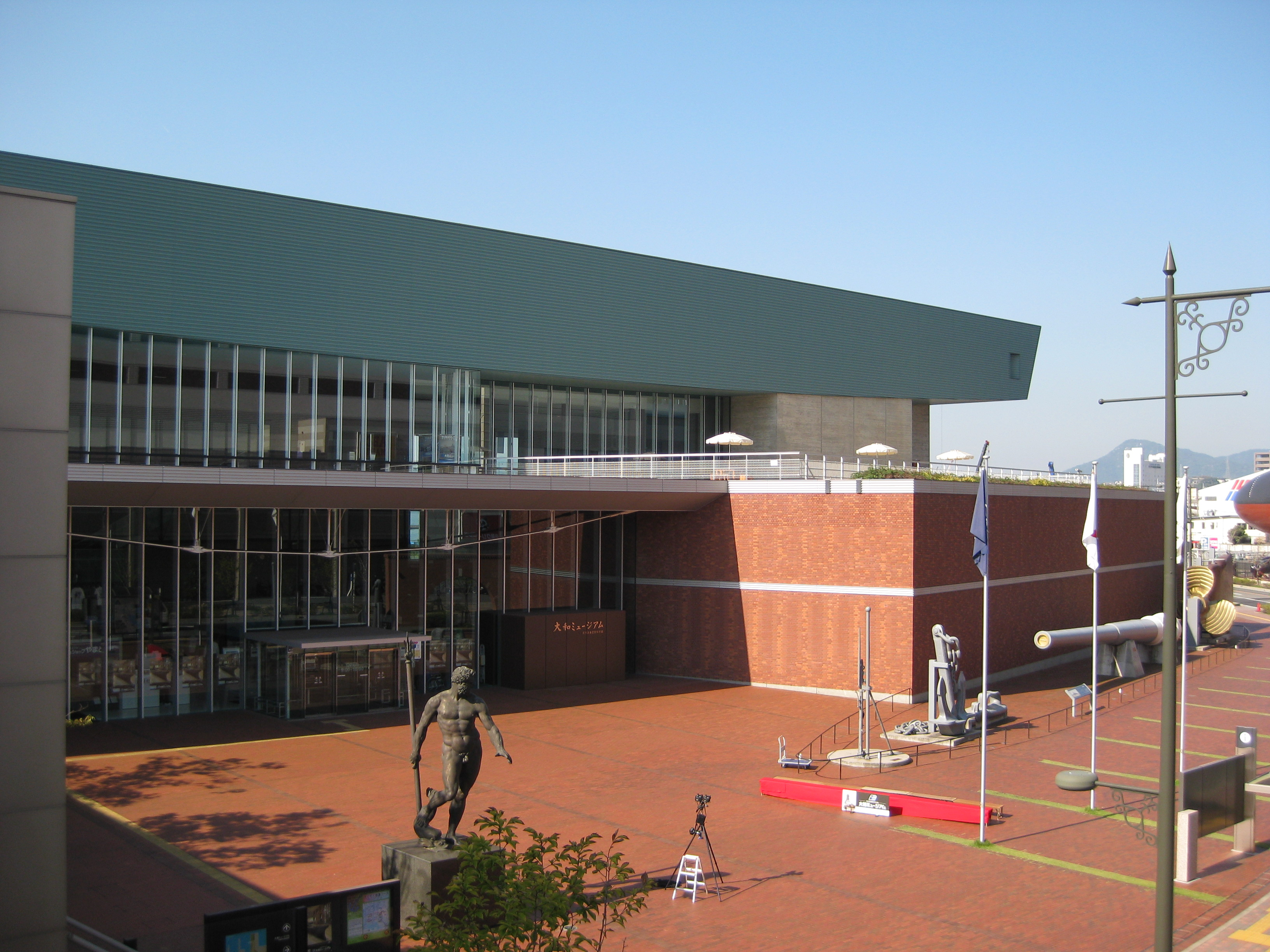

- Location within Japan Location within Hiroshima Prefecture
- Established: 23 April 2005
- Location: 5-20 Takara-machi, Kure City, Hiroshima Prefecture, Japan
- Coordinates: 34°14′28.09″N 132°33′20.9″E
- Type: Maritime museum, Military museum, Local history museum
- Founder: Kure City
- Director: Kazushige Todaka (ja)
- Website: https://yamato-museum.com/

The 1:10 scale model of the Yamato

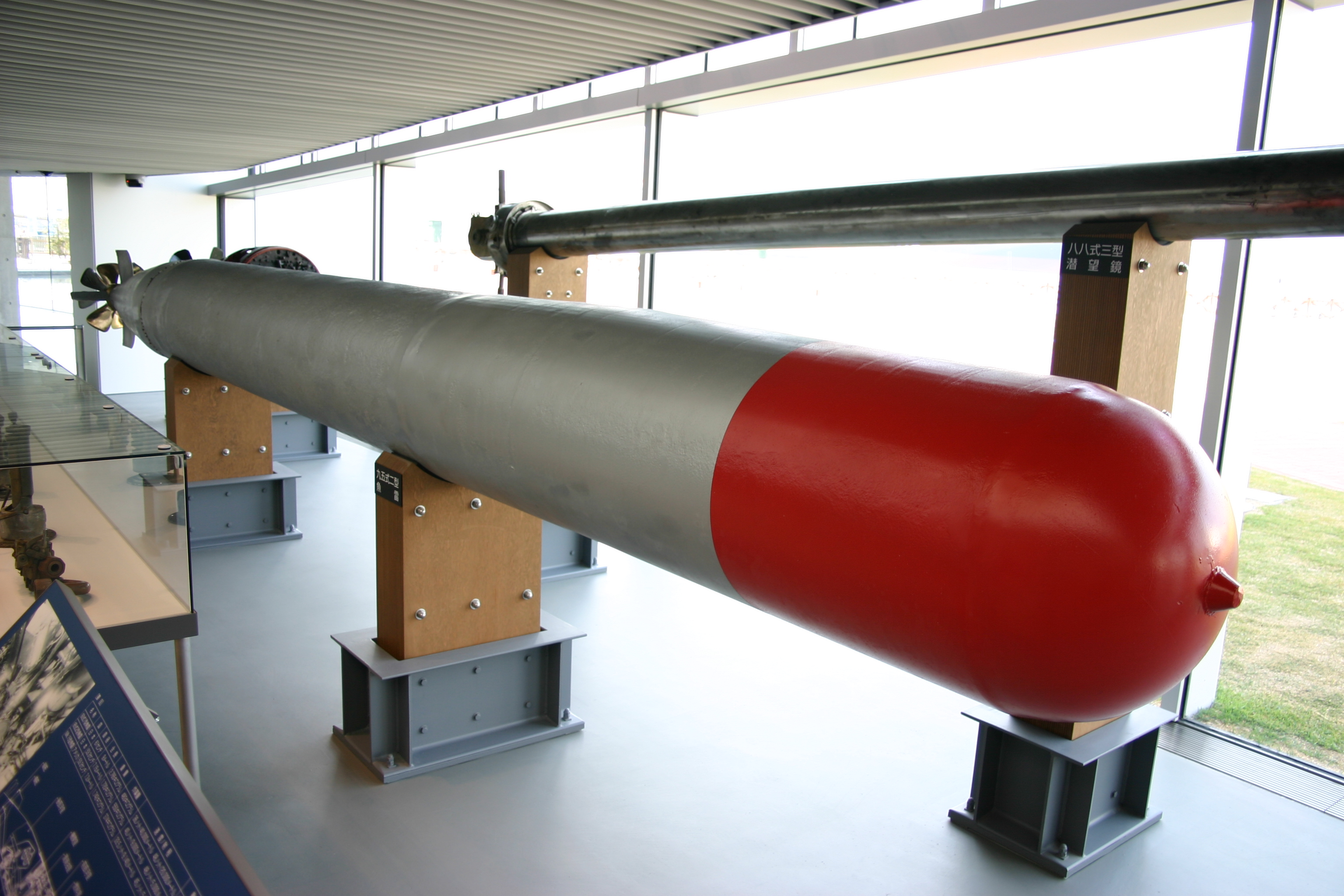
Type 95 torpedo display at Yamato Museum

The Yamato Museum (大和ミュージアム, Yamato Museum) is the nickname of the Kure Maritime Museum (呉市海事歴史科学館, Kure-shi Kaiji Rekishi Kagakukan) in Kure, Hiroshima, Japan.

== History ==
The museum opened on the 23rd of April 2005. It is nicknamed the Yamato Museum due to the display in the lobby of a 1/10 scale model of the battleship Yamato, the flagship of the Japanese Combined Fleet in World War II. It was sunk south of the Japanese island of Kyushu in 1945. The museum is located where the battleship was completed.

The museum closed for renovations from the 17th of February 2025 to the 23rd of April 2026. Upon closure, an antenna to the museum was opened nearby, displaying some of the museum's exhibits as well as a replica of a Mitsubishi F1M observation seaplane.

== Museum ==
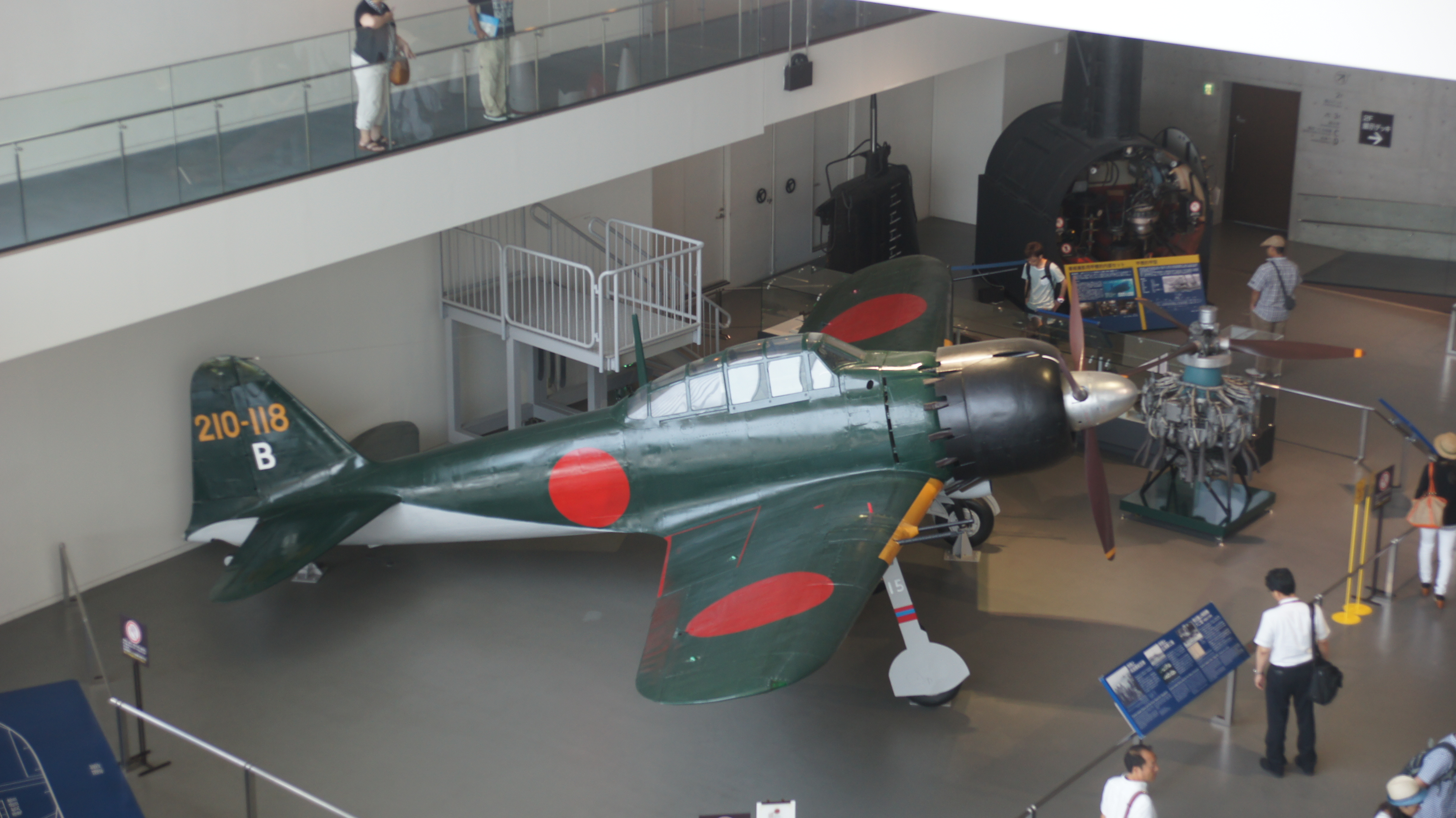
Mitsubishi A6M Zero model 62 in Yamato museum

=== Exhibition rooms ===
- Yamato Hiroba – 1/10 scale of the Yamato
- History of Kure – as the shipbuilding, port city and the Kure Naval District
- Large objects exhibition room - containing:
  - A Mitsubishi A6M Zero model 62
  - A Kaiten human torpedo
  - A Kairyū-class submarine
  - A Type 95 torpedo
  - Various shells, shell replicas, and shell elements from IJN warships, ranging from the 460 mm (18 in) to the 203 mm (8.0 in) calibers, and of the armor-piercing, high-explosive, and anti-aircraft types.
  - 1:1 replica of a 46 cm/45 Type 94 naval gun breech.
- 1:1 replica of one of the battleship Kongō's boilers.
- Chibi Yamato replica
- Collection of suicide notes from Kaiten pilots, as well as sword, will and photographs.
- Shipbuilding technology, including simulator, bouncy display device and cargo ship replica bow
- The Yamato in culture, references many anime and movies in particular the "Space Battleship Yamato" series
- Yamato theatre, which shows many films related to the IJN every day.
- Future prospects

=== Other rooms ===
The museum includes an experiment work room, library, citizens' gallery, meeting rooms, and gift shop, and an observation terrace on the 4th floor where people can view the area.

Temporary exhibits are also held in the 2nd floor' room.

=== Outside ===
On front of the museum are displayed a 41 cm/45 3rd Year Type naval gun, an anchor, a rudder, and a screw from the Japanese Battleship Mutsu.

Behind the museum, there is a brick park, a lawn plaza, and the "Yamato Wharf", a 1:1 scale silhouette of Yamato's bridge. A replica of an Aichi E16A Zuiun seaplane was also installed there in 2026.

West of the museum are located the submersible research ship Shinkai, as well as the original Kure naval arsenal' big lathe (N° 15299) which was used to craft the Yamato's 46 cm/45 Type 94 naval gun.

The Japan Maritime Self-Defense Force Kure Museum, which includes the retired JMSDF Yūshio-class submarine Akishio (SS-579), is located immediately North to the museum.

== Yamato wreckage ==
The sunken Yamato was surveyed previously, but in May 2015, digital technology was used for the first time. The footage shows many identifiable parts of the wreckage, such as the chrysanthemum crest on the bow, one of the 5 m (16 ft)-diameter propellers, and a detached main gun turret. The museum plans to show the nine-minute video repeatedly in its theater.

== Museum partnership ==
In 2015, the museum announced that it had entered into a sister museum partnership with the USS Missouri Memorial Association in Pearl Harbor, Hawaii. The agreement commemorates the 70th anniversary of the end of World War II.

The naval game franchise Kantai Collection and its parent company C2 Praparat Co., Ltd. are official partners of the museum, organizing various events with the museum and the Kure collectivity, being notably the main patreon for the lathe N° 15299's restoration. During the 2025 closure, C2 created a mural to mask the construction site hoarding, contributing to the renovation. The C2's Zuiun was also installed outside the Museum.

== Access ==
- JR Kure Station
- Kure City bus "Youmetown Yamato Museum-mae" bus stop
- Kure Port

== Gallery ==
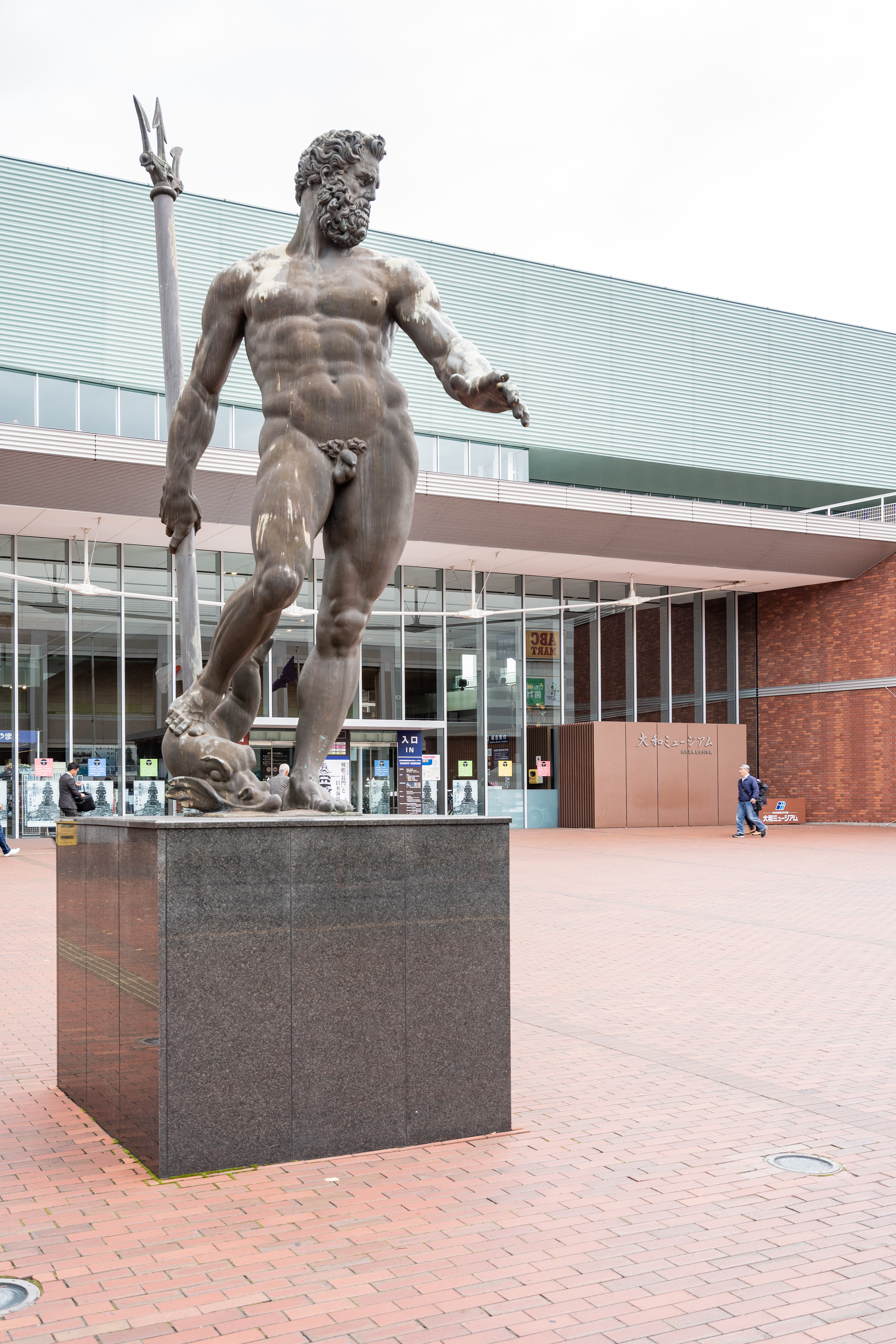
Statue of Poseidon in front of the Museum

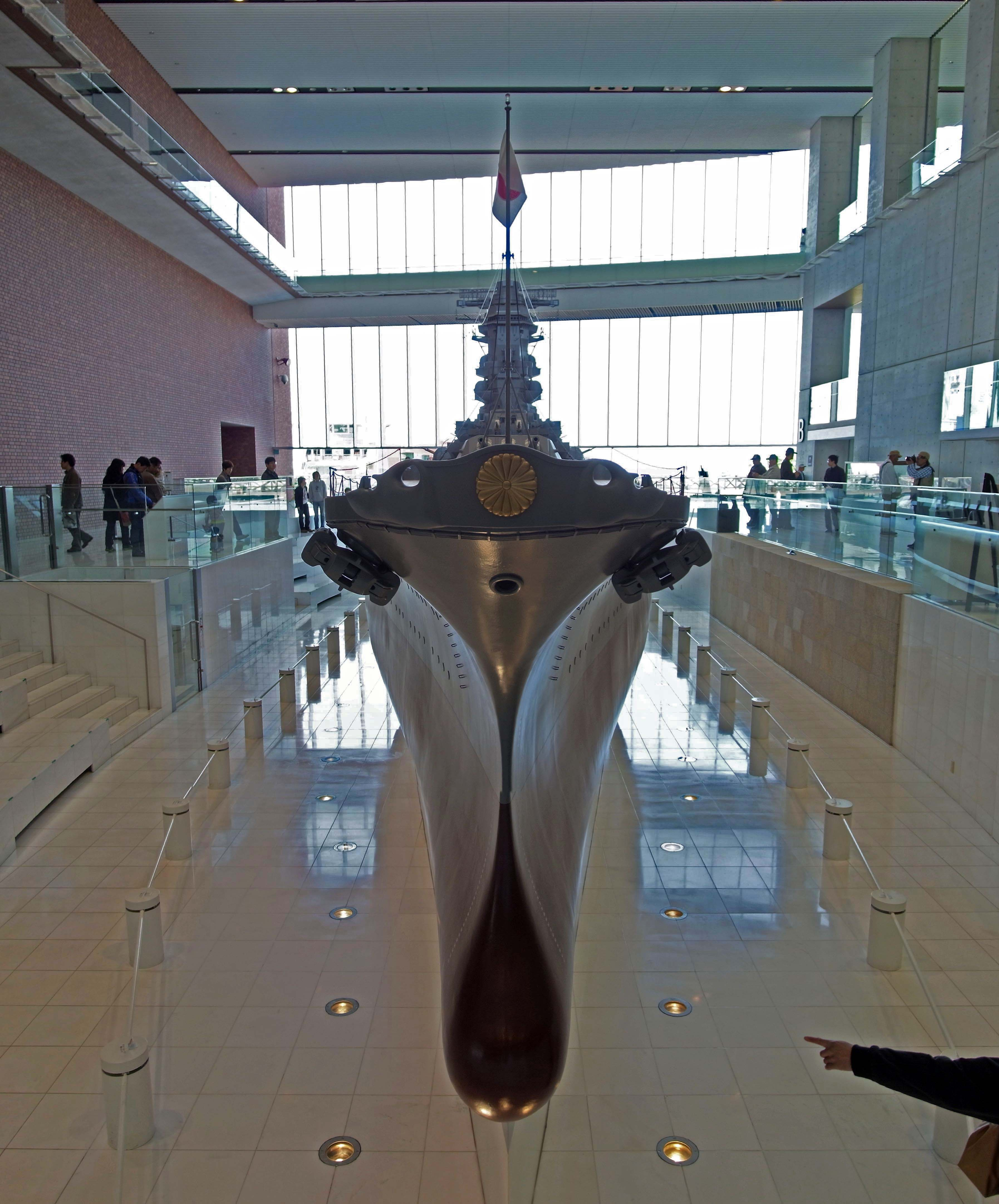
Imperial Seal on the front of the Yamato scale model

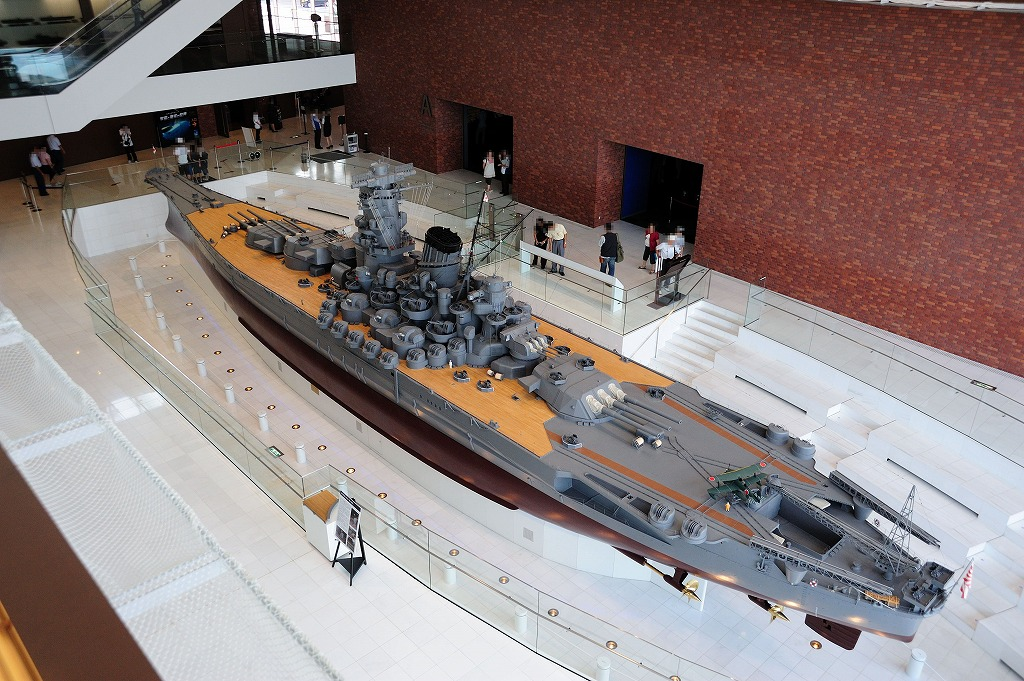
Back view of the 1:10 scale model of the Yamato

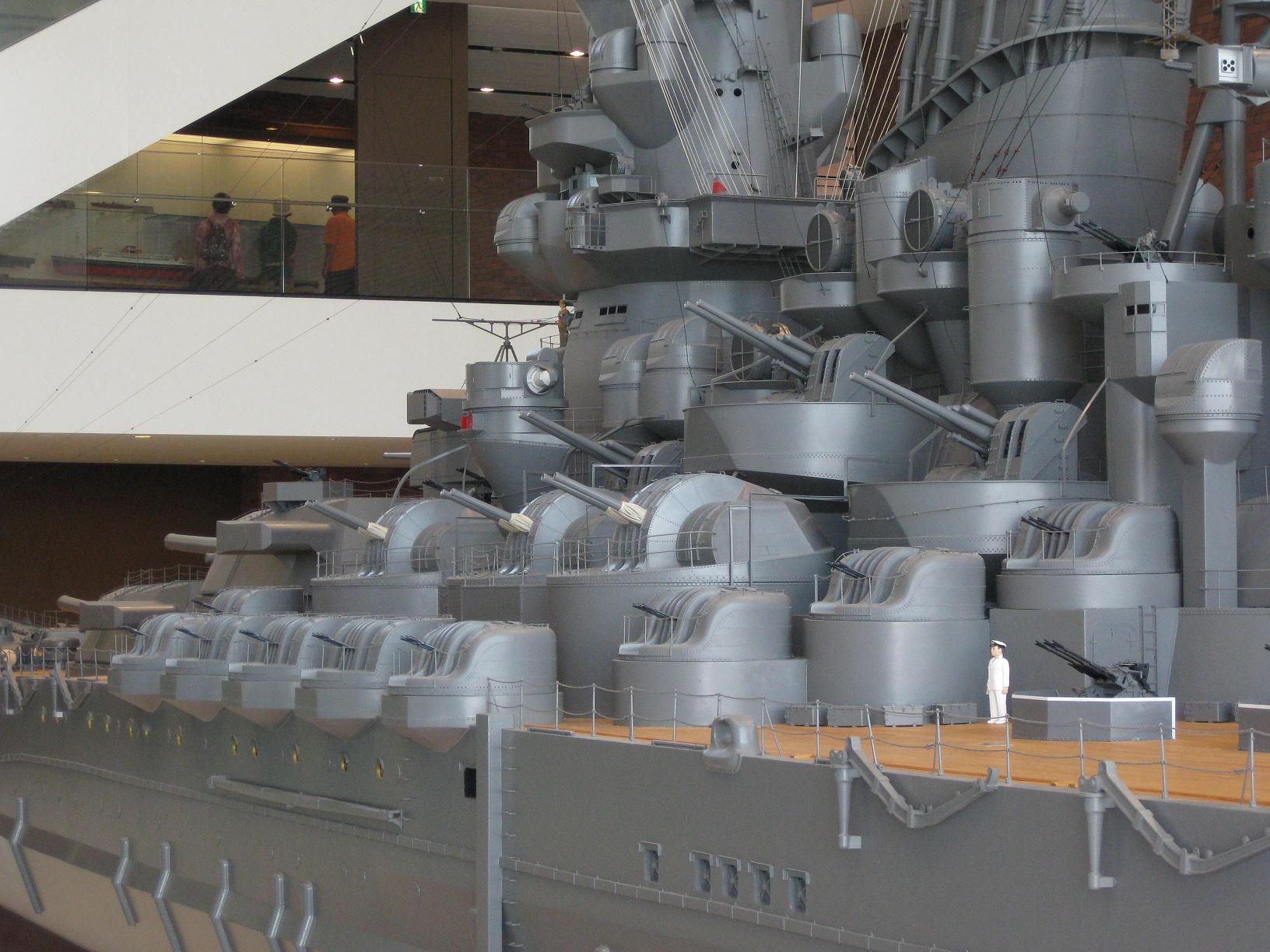
Anti-aircraft guns on the 1:10 scale model of the Yamato

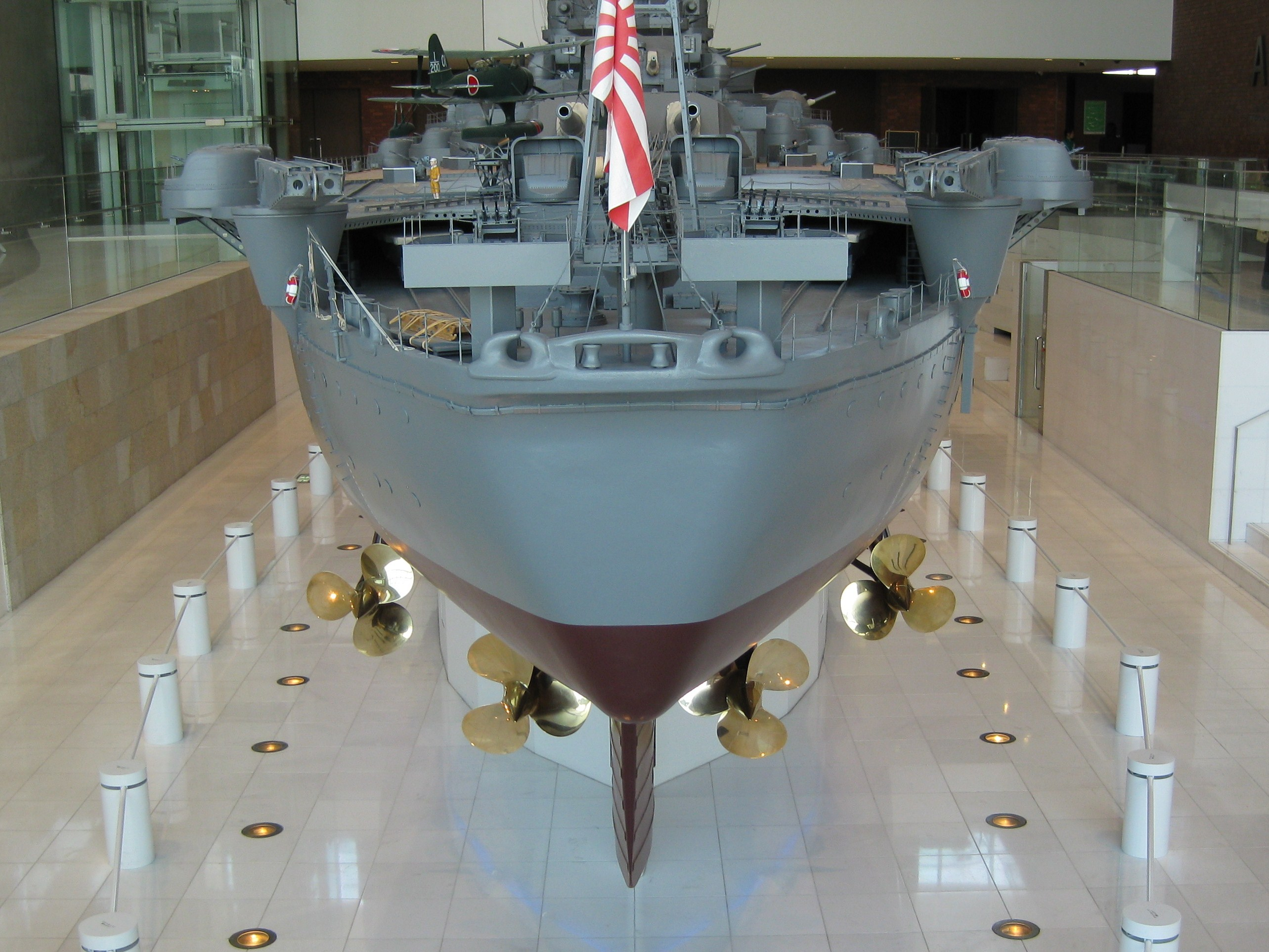
Stern side of the 1:10 scale model of the Yamato

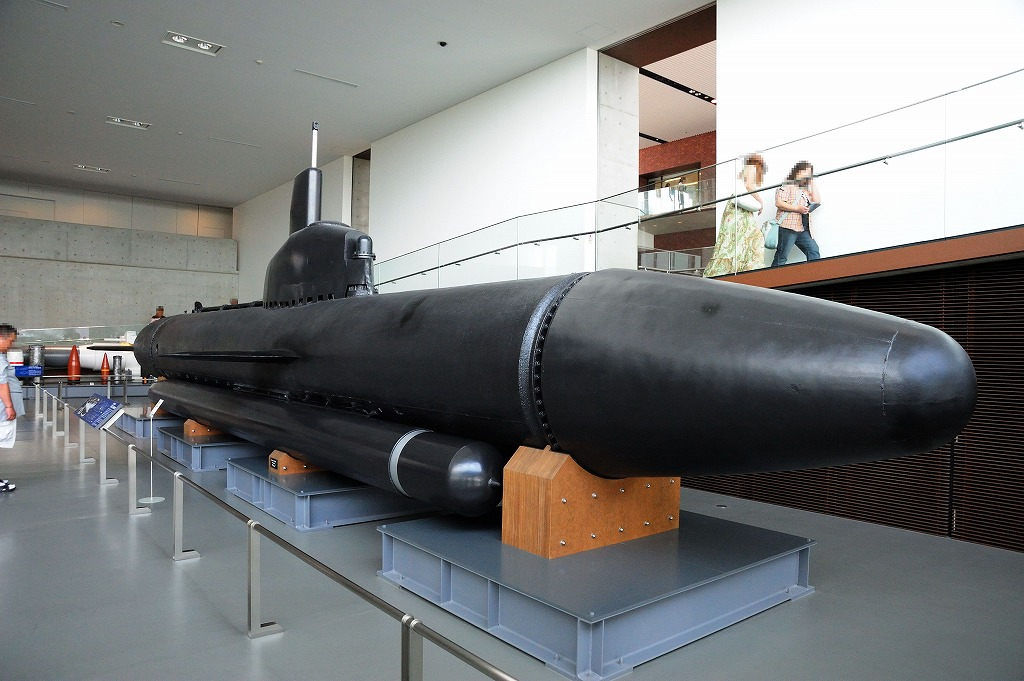
Kairyū-class submarine midget submarine in exhibition hall

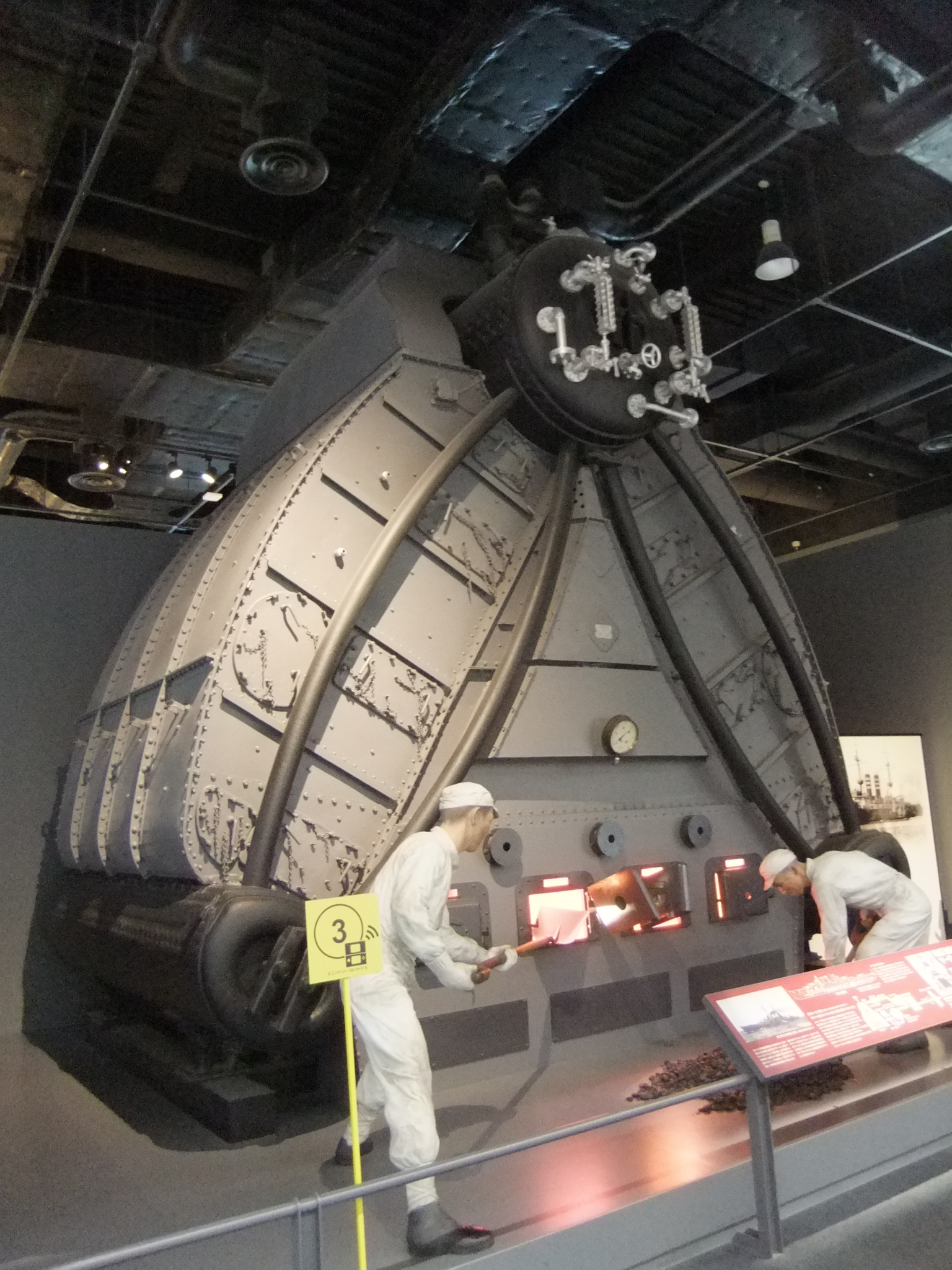
Ship boiler from the Battleship Kongō

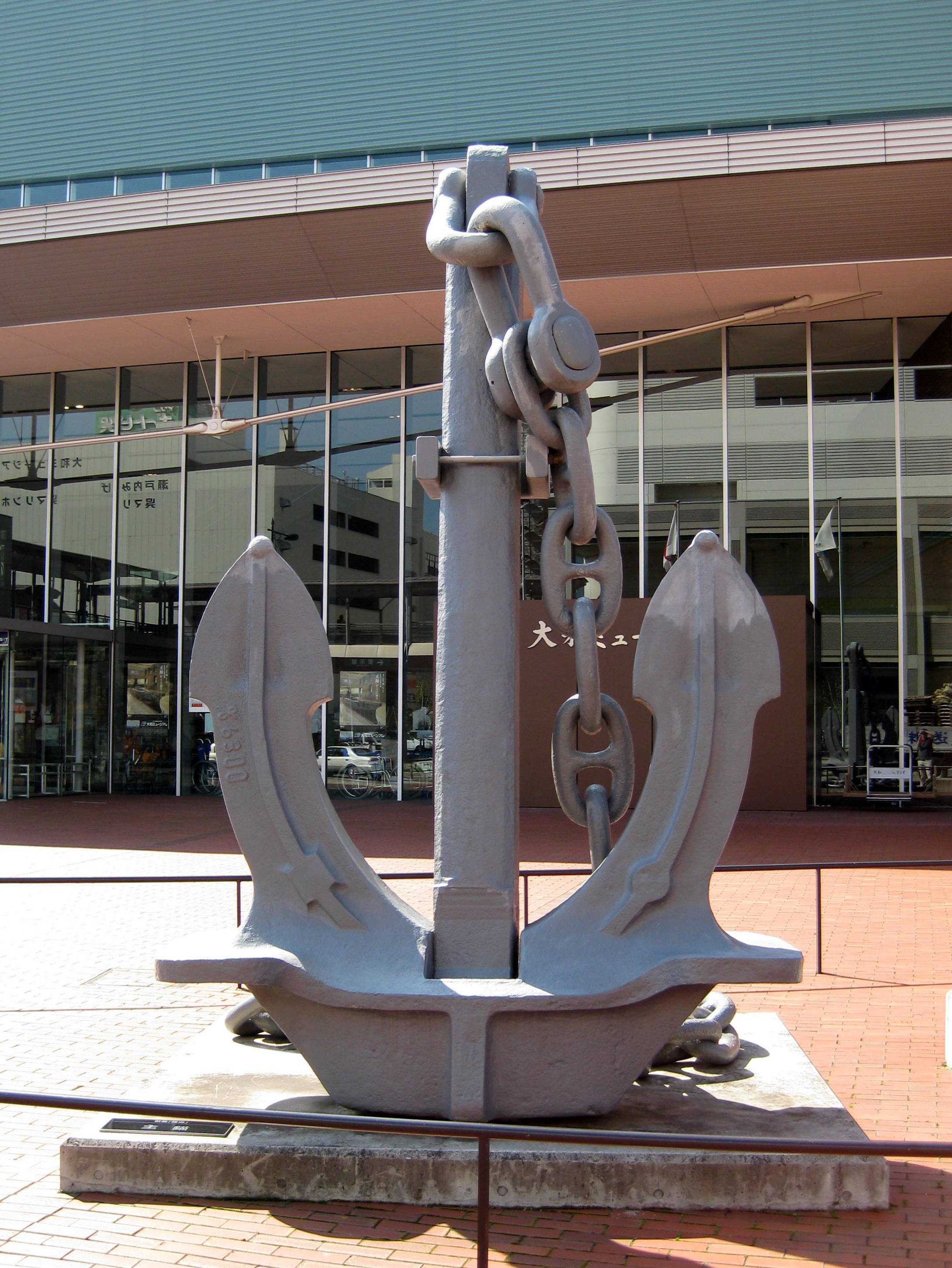
Anchor from the Battleship Mutsu

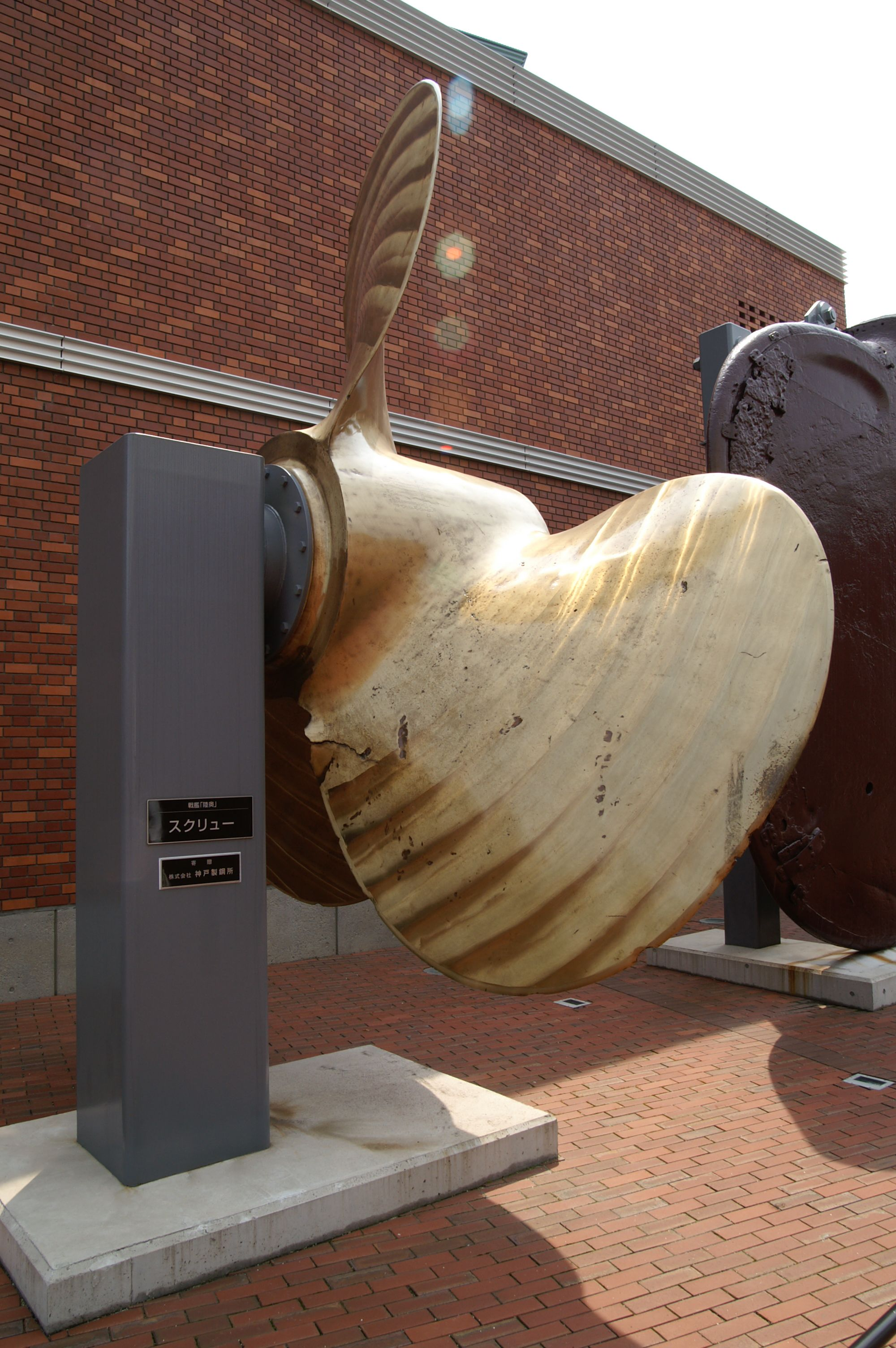
Propeller from the Battleship Mutsu

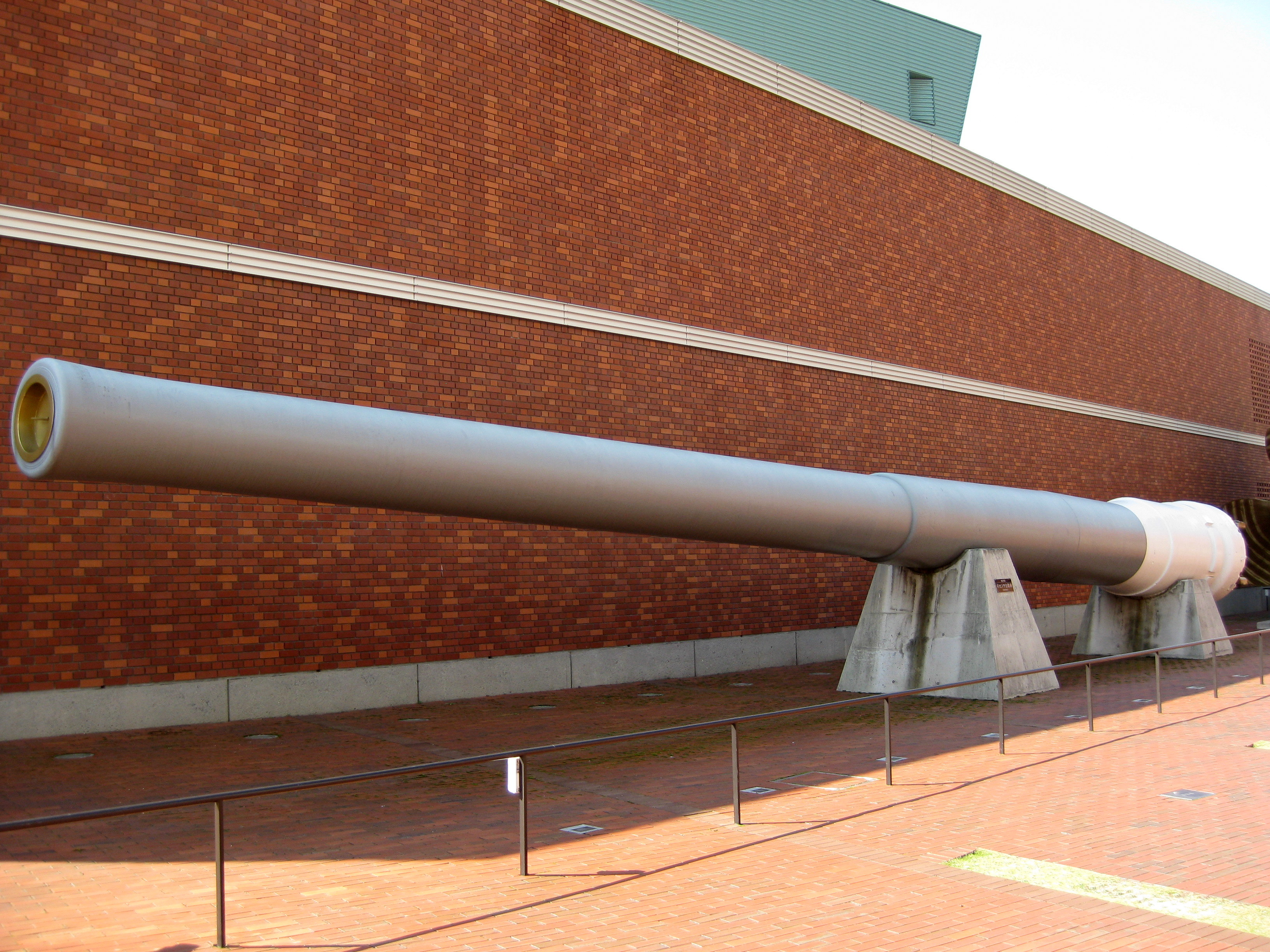
41 cm/45 3rd Year Type naval gun from the Battleship Mutsu

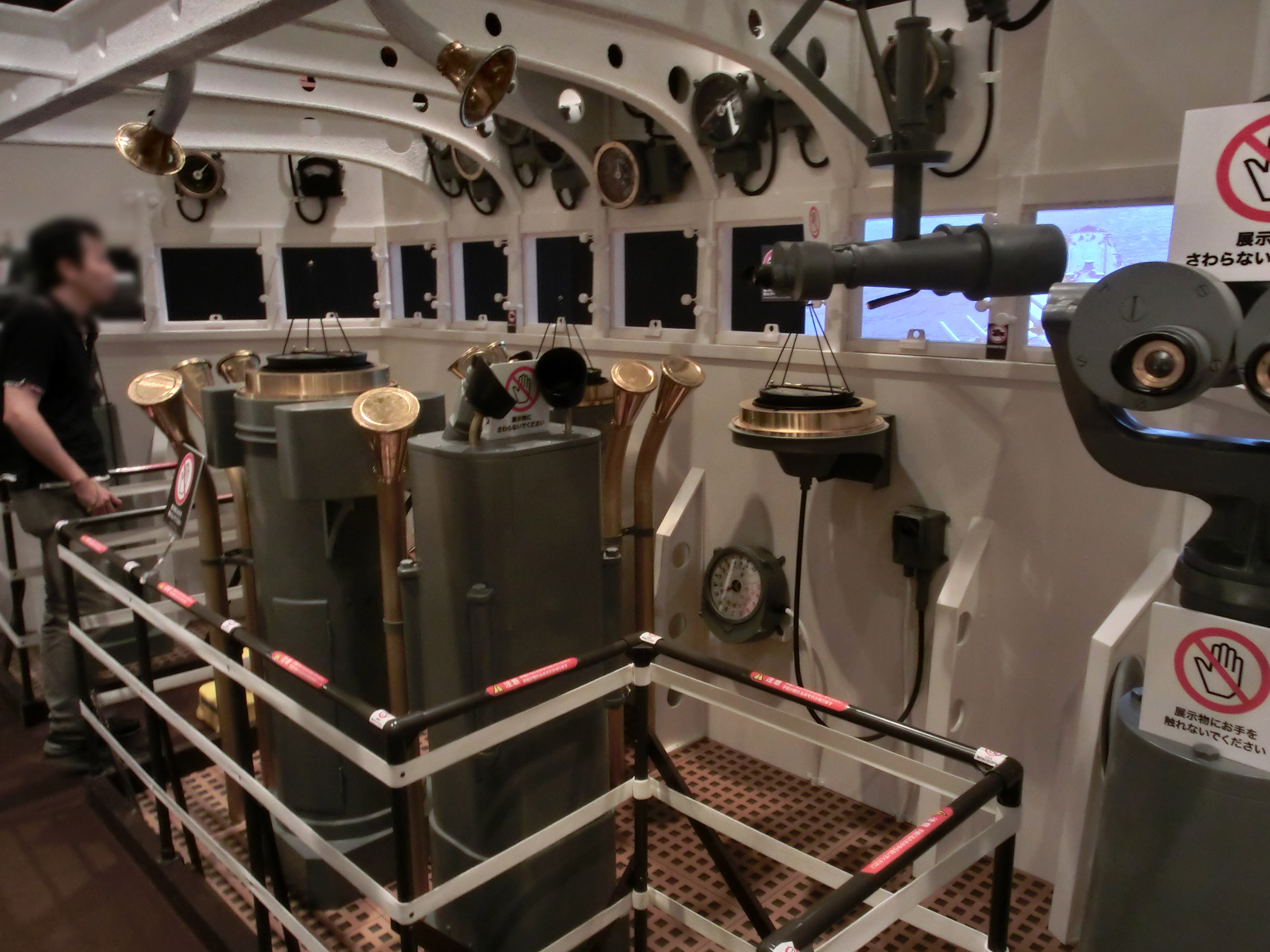
Recreation of the Yamato’s bridge

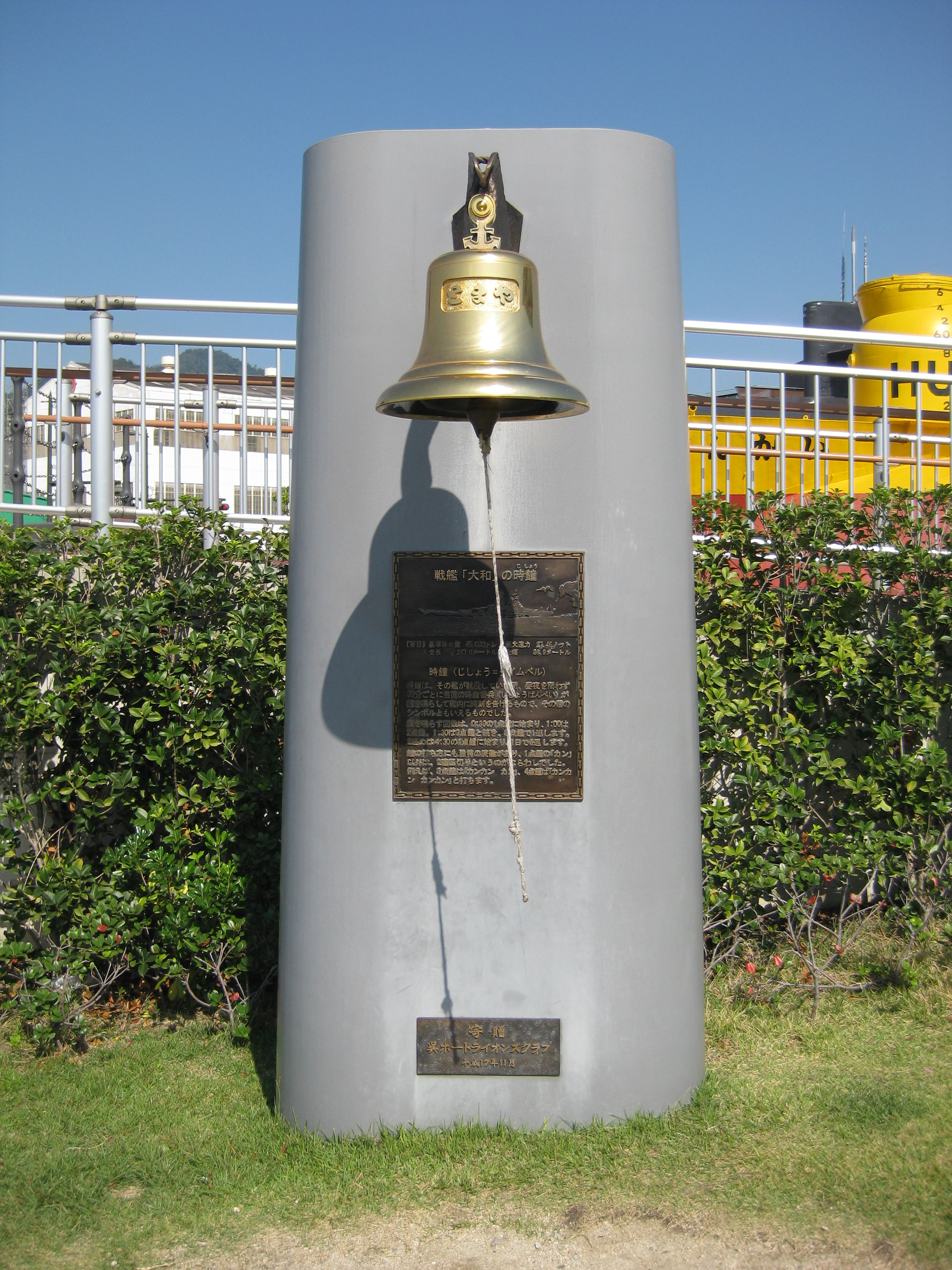
Replica of the Yamato’s ship bell

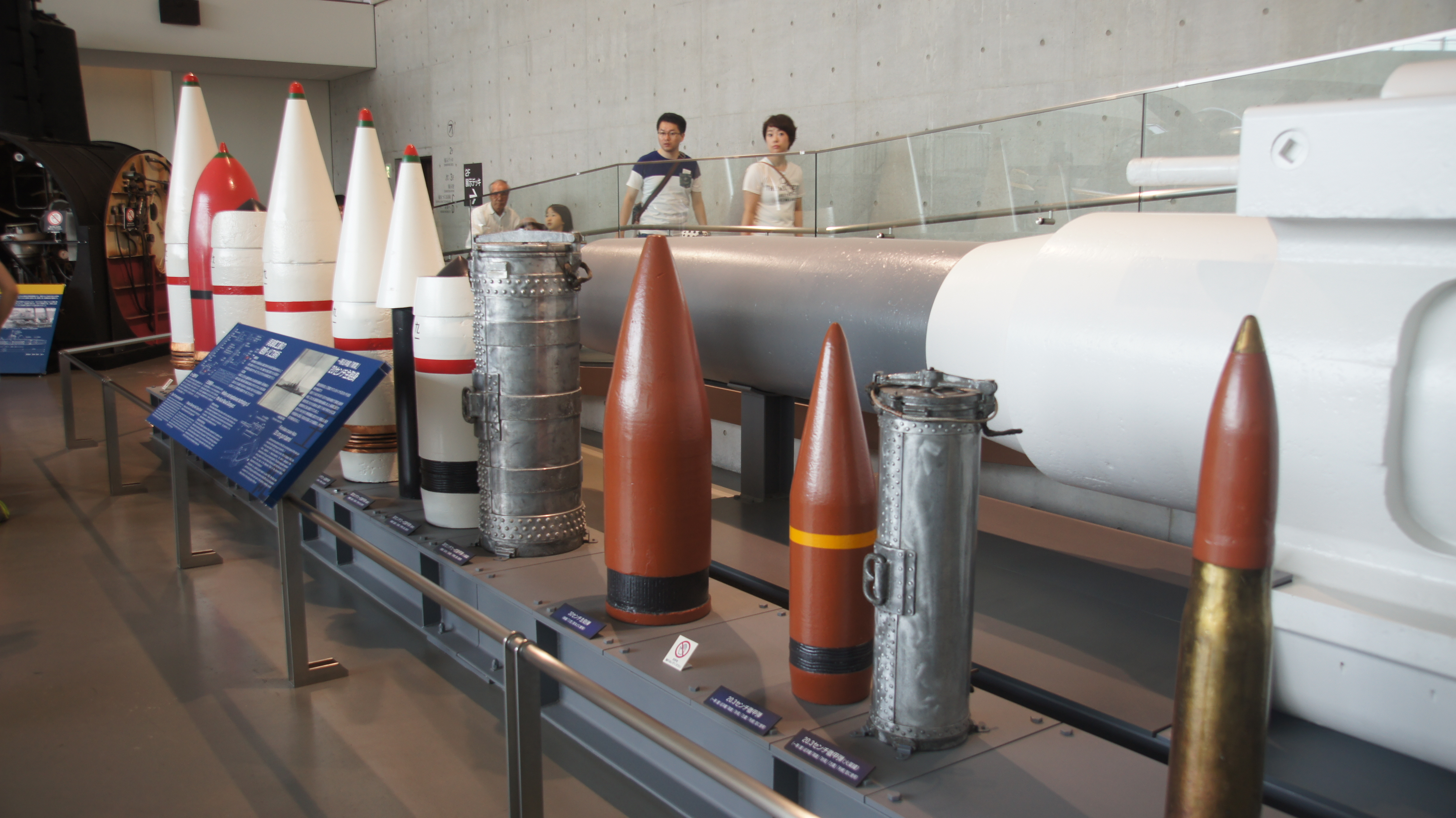
Shells used by the Imperial Japanese Navy during World War II

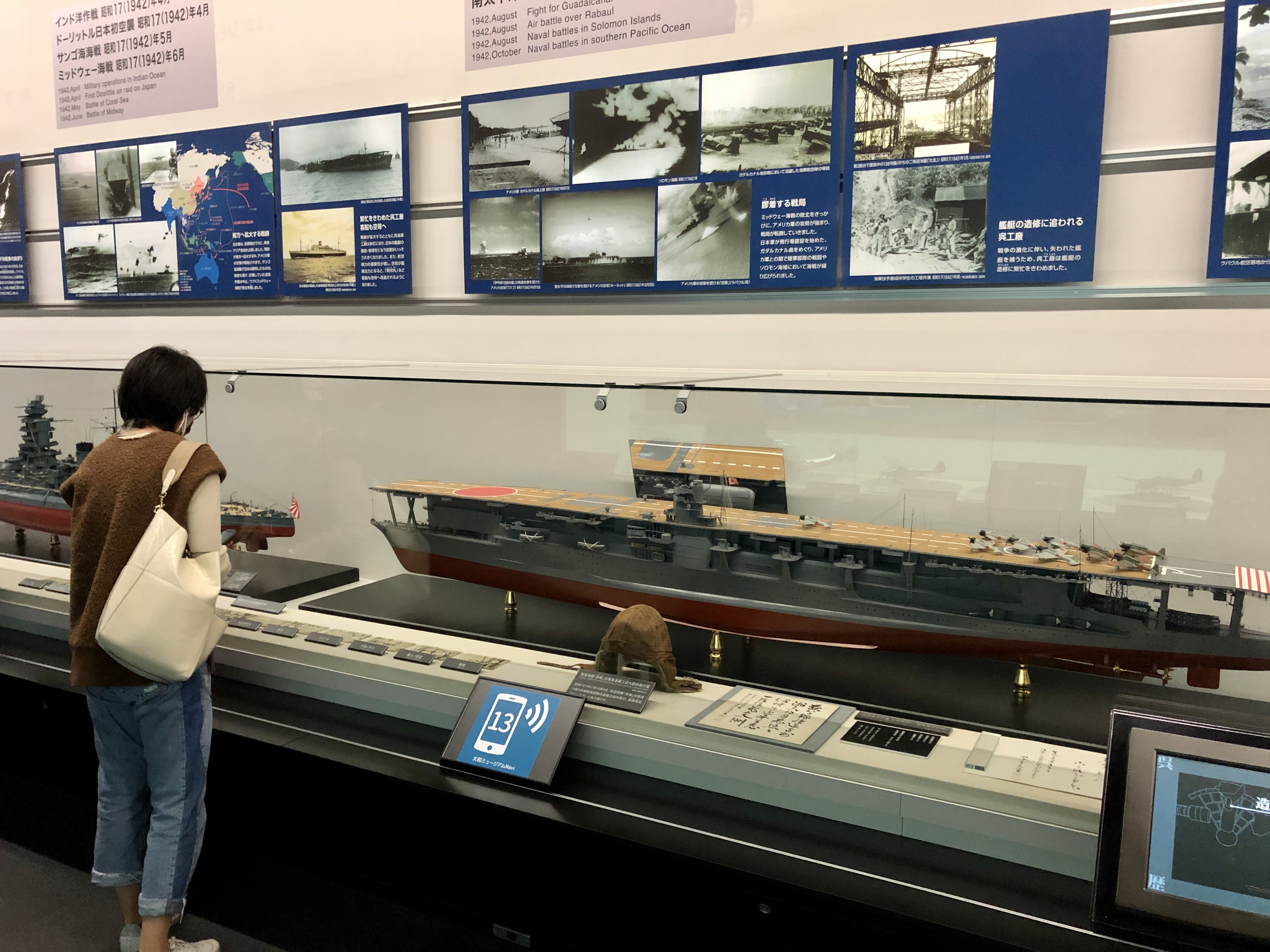
Model of Aircraft carrier Akagi

Big lathe (N° 15299)

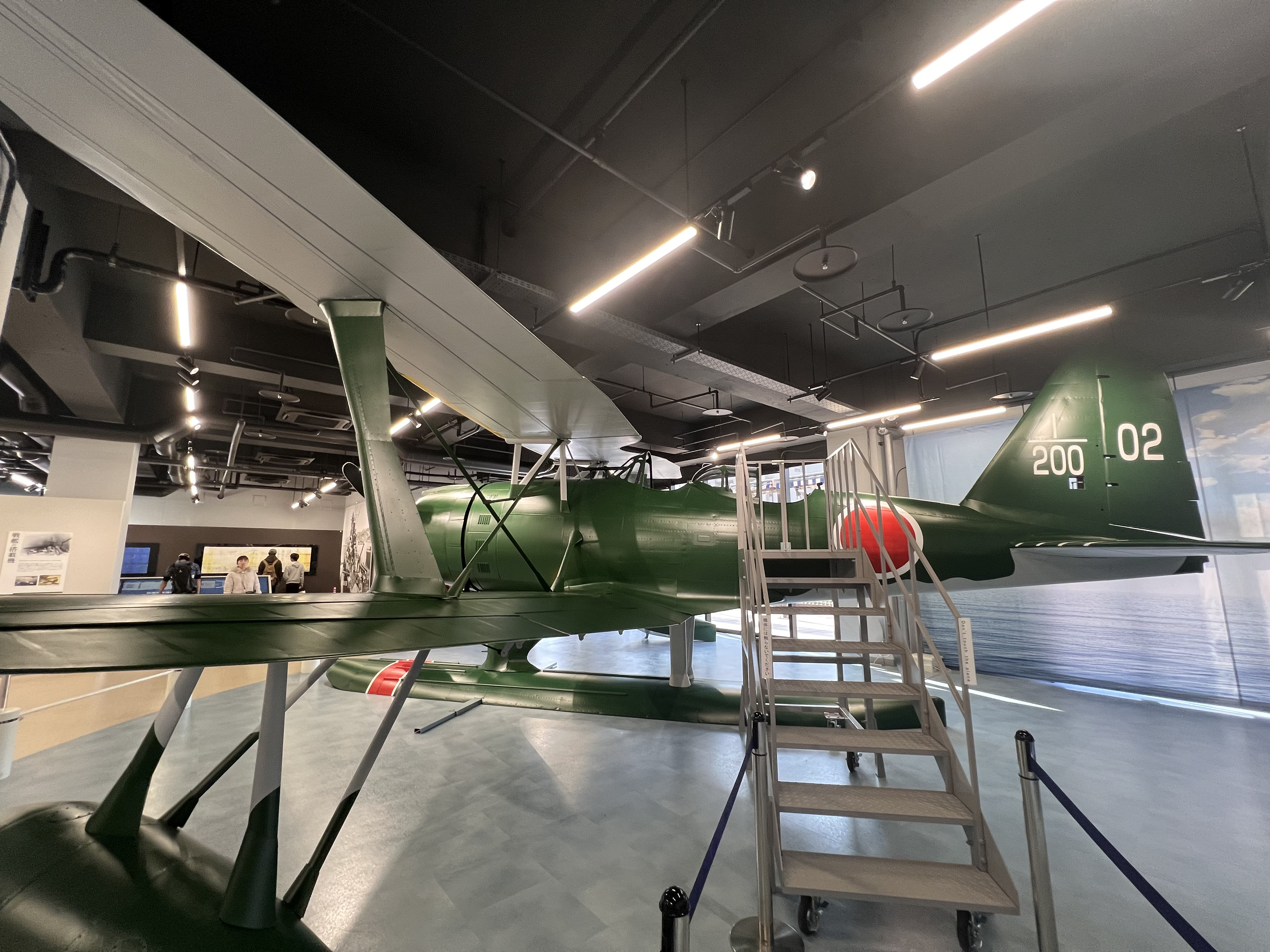
replica of the Mitsubishi F1M in the museum's antenna

== See also ==
- Kure Naval Arsenal
- Kure Naval District
- Yamato (film)
