= San Shiki (anti-aircraft shell) =

Japanese anti-aircraft shell

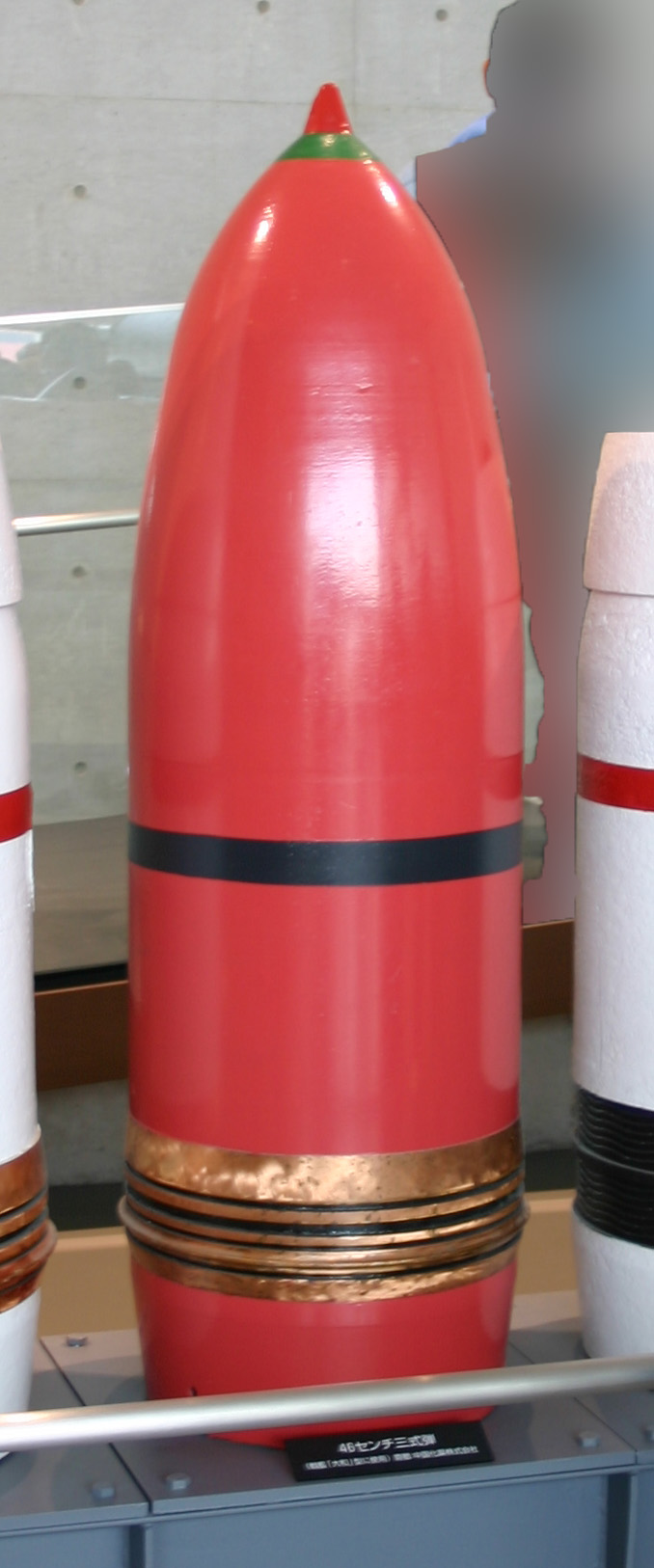
A 46 cm (18 in) Sanshiki shell displayed at the Yamato Museum

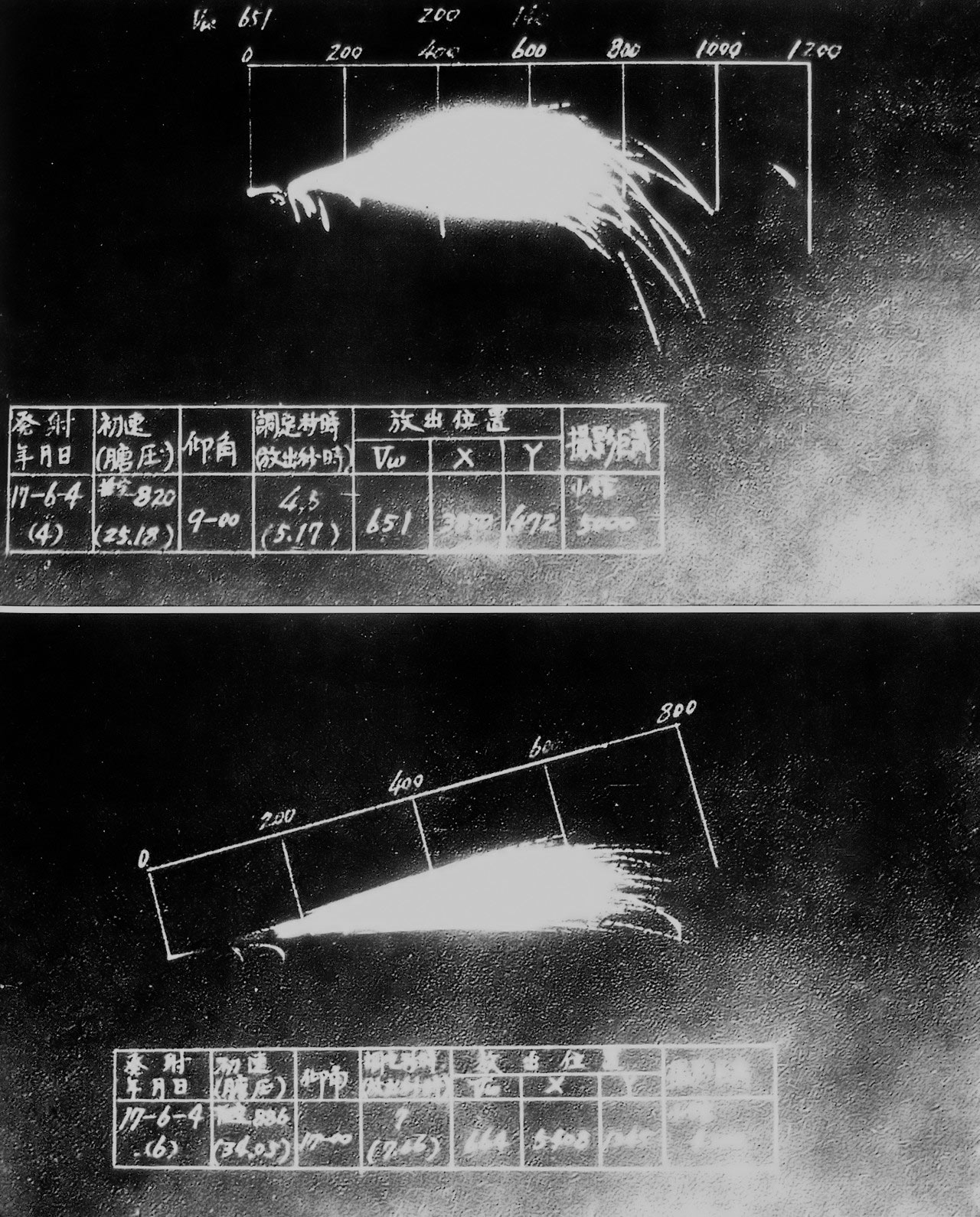
The explosion of a 46 cm (18 in) San Shikidan incendiary anti-aircraft shell

San-shiki-dan (三式弾; "Type 3 shell") was a World War II-era combined shrapnel and incendiary anti-aircraft round used by the Imperial Japanese Navy. They were supposedly referred to as Beehive rounds. The shells were intended to create a large volume of flame which attacking aircraft would have to fly through. However, U.S. pilots considered these shells to be more of a pyrotechnics display than an effective anti-aircraft weapon. (Note: These shells may have been nicknamed "The Beehive" while in service. See: DiGiulian, Tony (23 April 2007). "Japanese 40 cm/45 (18.1") Type 94, 46 cm/45 (18.1") Type 94". Navweaps.com.)

The Sanshiki anti-aircraft shell was designed for several gun calibers, from the 12.7 cm (5.0 in) up to the 46 cm (18 in) guns of the Yamato-class battleships.

== Specifications ==
These shells were composed of:

- Incendiary tubes:
  - The tubes were a hollow steel cylinder, 90 mm (3.5 in) long and 25 mm (1 in) diameter, filled with "rubber thermite" (45% elektron, 40% barium nitrate, 9.3% polysulfide synthetic rubber, 5% natural rubber, 0.5% sulphur, 0.2% stearic acid) and ignited through holes on both sides.
  - Once the shell exploded, the incendiary tubes ignited about a half-second later and burned for 5 seconds with 5-metre (16 ft) long flames,
- Steel stays, which held the shell structurally during its deployment and forming part of the shrapnel fragment,
- An explosive charge at its base, used to create a dispersion cone, to create the barrier wall,
- A delay fuze (Type 91), which was adjusted for each shot to change the triggering altitude of the explosive charge,
- A wooden warhead body, painted red.

Depending on the caliber, the composition of the shells could vary:

Gun	Mass & Length	Composition	Performances (dispersion)	Notes
46 cm (18 in)/45	1,360 kg (3,000 lb); 1,600 mm (63 in)	996 tubes 1500 stays 1500 fragments ? explosive charge	15° of dispersion 242 m (794 ft) diameter	Designation: Type 3 Shell Model 13
41 cm (16 in)/45	940 kg (2,070 lb); 1,400 mm (55 in)	940 tubes 375 stays 1110 fragments ? explosive charge	15° of dispersion 213 m (699 ft) diameter	
35.6 cm (14.0 in)/45	622 kg (1,371 lb); 1,200 mm (47 in)	480 tubes 199 stays 679 fragments ? explosive charge	15° of dispersion 152 m (499 ft) diameter	
20.3 cm (8.0 in)/50	126 kg (278 lb); 860 mm (34 in)	198 tubes 57 stays 255 fragments 2 kg (4.4 lb) explosive charge	13° of dispersion 100 m (330 ft) diameter	The maximum effective range was only 1,000 m (3,300 ft), with a maximum possible altitude of 10,000 m (33,000 ft)
12.7 cm (5.0 in)/40 Type 89; 12.7 cm (5.0 in)/50 Type 3	23 kg (51 lb); 437 mm (17.2 in)	43 tubes 23 stays 66 fragments ? explosive charge	10° of dispersion 54 m (177 ft) diameter	

During repairs after Operation Tungsten, the German battleship Tirpitz also used a specially-fuzed variation of this shell for its 38 cm (15 in) guns, for antiaircraft barrage fire.

== Operational history ==
The Sanshiki anti-aircraft shells were used for shore bombardment during the Battle for Henderson Field. On 13 October 1942, in order to help protect the transit of an important supply convoy to Guadalcanal that consisted of six slower cargo ships, the Japanese Combined Fleet commander Isoroku Yamamoto sent a naval force from Truk—commanded by Vice-Admiral Takeo Kurita—to bombard Henderson Field. Kurita's force—consisting of the battleships Kongō and Haruna, escorted by one light cruiser and nine destroyers—approached Guadalcanal unopposed and opened fire on Henderson Field at 01:33 on 14 October. Over the next 83 minutes, they fired 973 of the main gun 35.6 cm (14.0 in) shells, of which 104 were Type 3s fired by Kongō. The rest of the shells were 189 Type 0 "HE" shells and 625 Type 1 "AP" shells which fell into the Lunga perimeter, most of them falling in and around the 2,200-square-metre (0.54-acre) area of the airfield. The bombardment heavily damaged the airfield's two runways, burned almost all of the available aviation fuel, destroyed 48 of the CAF's ("Cactus Air Force") 90 aircraft, and killed 41 men, including six CAF aircrew.

During the First Naval Battle of Guadalcanal on 13 November 1942, another Japanese naval force attempted to bombard Henderson Field but before they could reach their target they were intercepted by American cruisers and destroyers. The first few salvos from the battleships Hiei and Kirishima consisted of the Sanshiki anti-aircraft shells, as their crews were not expecting a ship-to-ship confrontation and took several minutes to switch to armor-piercing ammunition, with several Sanshiki shells hitting the cruiser USS San Francisco, causing less serious damage than that which would have been inflicted by armor-piercing shells.

Even though the 3 Shiki tsûjôdan shells comprised 40% of the total main ammunition load of the Yamato-class battleships by 1944, they were rarely used in combat against enemy aircraft. The blast of the main guns turned out to disrupt the fire of the smaller antiaircraft guns. In addition the copper driving bands of the rounds were poorly machined and constant firing was damaging to the gun rifling; indeed, one of the shells may have exploded early and disabled one of Musashi's guns during the Battle of the Sibuyan Sea. Yamato fired these shells in two separate instances during Operation Ten-Go, first against PBM Mariner flying boats shadowing her, and later against the attacking aircraft of Task Force 58.
