= Number 13-class battleship =

Japanese planned class of battleships

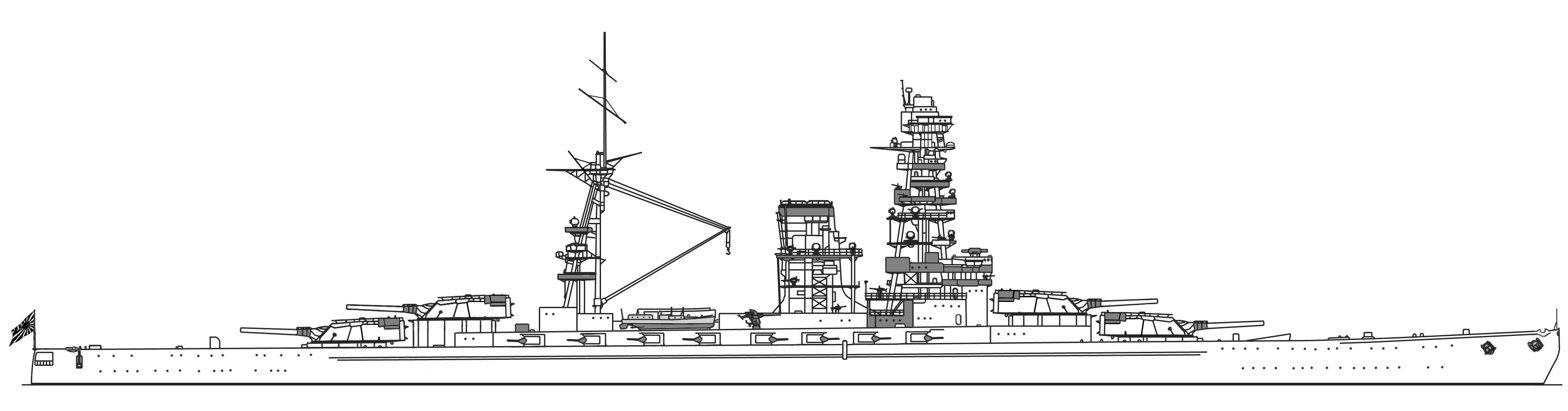
- Right elevation line drawing of the design for the Number 13 class

Class overview
- Builders: Kure Naval Arsenal; Yokosuka Naval Arsenal; Kawasaki Shipyard, Kobe; Mitsubishi Shipyard, Nagasaki
- Operators: Imperial Japanese Navy
- Preceded by: Kii class
- Succeeded by: Yamato class
- Planned: 4
- Cancelled: 4

General characteristics
- Type: Fast battleship
- Displacement: 47,500 t (46,700 long tons) (normal (Note: meaning displacement loaded with 25% of its full fuel, 75% of its ammunition and 50% fresh water))
- Length: 274.4 m (900 ft 3 in)
- Beam: 30.8 m (101 ft 1 in)
- Draft: 9.8 m (32 ft 2 in)
- Installed power: 22 × water-tube boilers; 150,000 shp (110,000 kW)
- Propulsion: 4 shafts; 4 × geared steam turbines
- Speed: 30 knots (56 km/h; 35 mph)
- Armament: 4 × twin 46 cm (18 in) guns; 16 × single 14 cm (5.5 in) guns; 8 × single 12 cm (4.7 in) AA guns; 8 × 61 cm (24 in) torpedo tubes
- Armor: Waterline belt: 330 mm (13 in); Deck: 127 mm (5 in)

The Number 13-class battleship was a planned class of four fast battleships to be built for the Imperial Japanese Navy (IJN) during the 1920s. The ships never received any names, being known only as Numbers 13–16. They were intended to reinforce Japan's "eight-eight fleet" of eight battleships and eight battlecruisers after the United States announced a major naval construction program in 1919. The Number 13 class was designed to be superior to all other existing battleships, planned or building. After the signing of the Washington Naval Treaty in 1922, they were cancelled in November 1923 before construction could begin.

== Design and background ==
By 1918, the Navy had gained approval for an "eight-six" fleet, all ships under eight years old. However, having four large battleships and four battlecruisers on order put an enormous financial strain on Japan, which was spending about a third of its national budget on the Navy. Despite this, the IJN gained approval of the "eight-eight-eight" plan in 1920 after American President Woodrow Wilson announced plans in 1919 to re-initiate the 1916 plan for ten additional battleships and six battlecruisers. The Japanese response required the construction of eight additional fast battleships in the Kii and the Number 13 classes.

When designing the latter class, the Japanese followed the doctrine that they had used since the First Sino-Japanese War of 1894–1895 of compensating for quantitative inferiority with qualitative superiority. In the words of naval historian Siegfried Breyer, "had [the ships] been completed, they would have been the world's largest and most powerful battleships. Their gun calibre alone would have caused a new and more intensive naval arms race. From an engineering aspect they were more than ten years ahead of their time because they anticipated the characteristics of the fully developed, fast battleship." Naval architects William Garzke and Robert Dulin concur saying, "These ships would have completely outclassed any European battleship".

The Number 13 class was designed by Captain Yuzuru Hiraga, the naval architect responsible for most of the previous Japanese capital ships. The ships were based on his previous Kii-class battleship and Amagi-class battlecruiser designs, enlarged to take 457-millimeter (18 in) guns.

=== Description ===
The ships had a length of 259.1 meters (850 ft 1 in) between perpendiculars and 274.4 meters (900 ft 3 in) overall. They had a beam of 30.8 meters (101 ft 1 in) and a draft of 9.8 meters (32 ft 2 in). The normal displacement of the battleships was 47,500 metric tons (46,700 long tons).

The class was intended to be equipped with four Gijutsu-Hombu geared steam turbines, each of which drove one propeller shaft. The turbines were designed to produce a total of 150,000 shaft horsepower (110,000 kW), using steam provided by 22 Kampon oil-fired water-tube boilers, to reach a maximum speed of 30 knots (56 km/h; 35 mph).

The primary armament of the Number 13 class was eight 50-caliber 460-millimeter guns in four twin-gun turrets, two each superfiring fore and aft of the superstructure. No examples of this gun were ever built, but it was planned to fire a 1,550 kg (3,420 lb) shell at a muzzle velocity of 800 m/s (2,600 ft/s). The secondary battery consisted of 16 single 50-caliber 14-centimetre (5.5 in) guns mounted in casemates in the superstructure. The manually operated guns had a maximum range of 19,750 m (21,600 yd) at an elevation of +35° and fired at a rate up to 10 rounds per minute. The ships' anti-aircraft defenses consisted of either four or eight single 45-caliber 12-centimetre (4.7 in) 10th Year Type anti-aircraft guns mounted around the single funnel. Each of these guns had a maximum elevation of +75° and a maximum rate of fire of 10–11 rounds per minute. They could fire a 20.41 kg (45.0 lb) projectile with a muzzle velocity of 825–830 m/s (2,710–2,720 ft/s) to a maximum height of 10,000 m (32,808 ft). The Number 13 class was also designed with eight 61-centimeter (24 in) above-water torpedo tubes, four on each broadside.

The waterline armor belt was intended to have a maximum thickness of 330 millimeters (13 in) and, like the Kii class, it was angled 15° outwards at the top to increase its ability to resist penetration at short range. The deck armor would have had a total thickness of 127 mm (5 in).

== Construction ==
After the end of World War I, the United Kingdom, the United States and the Empire of Japan all announced large capital ship building programs, incorporating design lessons from the war. These ships would have been much larger and more expensive than earlier vessels and President Warren G. Harding called a conference at Washington, D. C. in late 1921 to forestall a very expensive arms race. The attendees at the conference agreed to limit capital ship construction for the next decade and scrapped large numbers of existing ships as well as many ships still under construction. Japan suspended the Number 13 class while the conference was in progress before any ship was laid down and formally cancelled them on 19 November 1923. As construction of the ships was scheduled to begin in 1922, and be completed by 1927, they were already allocated to specific shipyards:

Ship	Builder
Number 13	Yokosuka Naval Arsenal; Yokosuka
Number 14	Kure Naval Arsenal; Kure
Number 15	Mitsubishi; Nagasaki
Number 16	Kawasaki; Kobe

== See also ==
- N3 battleship - British contemporary planned warship
