= Tosa-class battleship =

Abortive class of Japanese dreadnought battleships

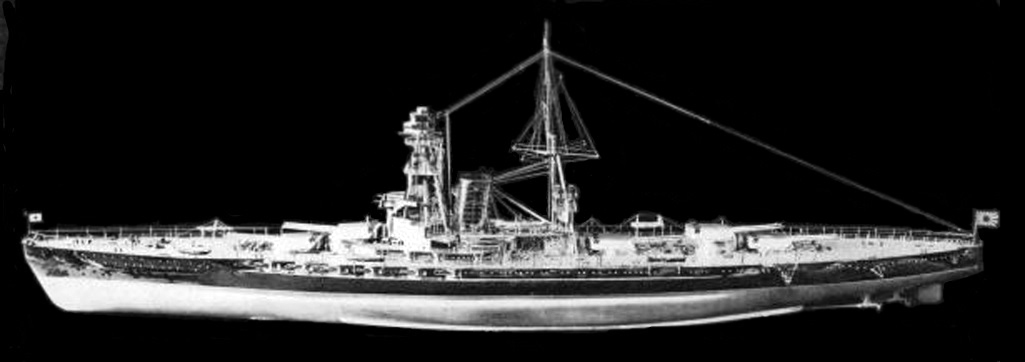
- Scale model of Kaga as originally designed

Class overview
- Name: Tosa class
- Builders: Mitsubishi Shipbuilding & Eng., Nagasaki; Kawasaki Dockyard, Kobe
- Operators: Imperial Japanese Navy
- Preceded by: Nagato class
- Succeeded by: Kii class
- Built: 1920–1922
- Planned: 2
- Completed: 1 converted to an aircraft carrier (Kaga)
- Canceled: 1

General characteristics
- Type: Dreadnought battleship
- Displacement: 39,900 t (39,300 long tons) (normal); 44,200 t (43,500 long tons) (full load)
- Length: 234.09 m (768 ft)
- Beam: 30.5 m (100 ft 1 in)
- Draft: 9.4 m (30 ft 10 in)
- Installed power: 12 × water-tube boilers; 91,000 shp (68,000 kW)
- Propulsion: 4 × shafts; 4 × geared steam turbines
- Speed: 26.5 knots (49.1 km/h; 30.5 mph)
- Range: 5,500 nmi (10,200 km; 6,300 mi) at 16 knots (30 km/h; 18 mph)
- Armament: 5 × twin 41 cm (16.1 in) guns; 20 × single 14 cm (5.5 in) guns; 4 × single 7.62 cm (3 in) AA guns; 8 × 61 cm (24 in) torpedo tubes
- Armor: Waterline belt: 280 mm (11 in); Deck: 102 mm (4 in); Barbettes: 229–305 mm (9–12 in); Conning tower: 356 mm (14 in)

The Tosa-class battleships (土佐型戦艦, Tosa-gata Senkan) (Note: The ships are sometimes referred to as the Kaga class, after the ship that was planned to have been completed first.) were two dreadnoughts ordered as part of the "Eight-Eight" fleet for the Imperial Japanese Navy (IJN) during the early 1920s. The ships were larger versions of the preceding Nagato class, and carried an additional 41-centimeter (16.1 in) twin-gun turret. The design for the class served as a basis for the Amagi-class battlecruisers.

Both ships were launched in late 1921, but the first ship, Tosa, was cancelled in accordance with the terms of the Washington Naval Treaty before it could be completed, and was used in experiments testing the effectiveness of its armor scheme before being scuttled in the Bungo Channel. The hull of the second ship, Kaga, was converted into an aircraft carrier of the same name. The carrier supported Japanese troops in China during the Second Sino-Japanese War of the late 1930s, and took part in the attack on Pearl Harbor on 7 December 1941 and the invasion of Rabaul in the Southwest Pacific in January 1942. The following month her aircraft participated in the combined carrier airstrike on Darwin, Australia, during the Dutch East Indies campaign. She was sunk during the Battle of Midway in 1942.

== Background ==
The IJN believed that a modern battle fleet of eight battleships and eight armored cruisers was necessary for the defense of Japan; the government ratified that idea in 1907. This policy was the genesis of the Eight-Eight Fleet Program, the development of a cohesive battle line of sixteen capital ships less than eight years old. Advances in naval technology represented by the British battleship HMS Dreadnought and the battlecruiser HMS Invincible forced the IJN to reevaluate on several occasions which ships it considered "modern" and, in 1911, it restarted the program with orders for the Fusō-class super dreadnoughts and the Kongō-class battlecruisers. By 1915, the IJN was halfway to its goal and wanted to order four more super dreadnoughts, but the Diet rejected the plan and authorized only the dreadnought Nagato and two battlecruisers in the 1916 budget. Later that year American President Woodrow Wilson announced plans for ten additional battleships and six battlecruisers, and the Diet authorized three more dreadnoughts in response the following year: a second Nagato-class battleship—Mutsu—and two to a modified design, Tosa and Kaga.

== Design and description ==
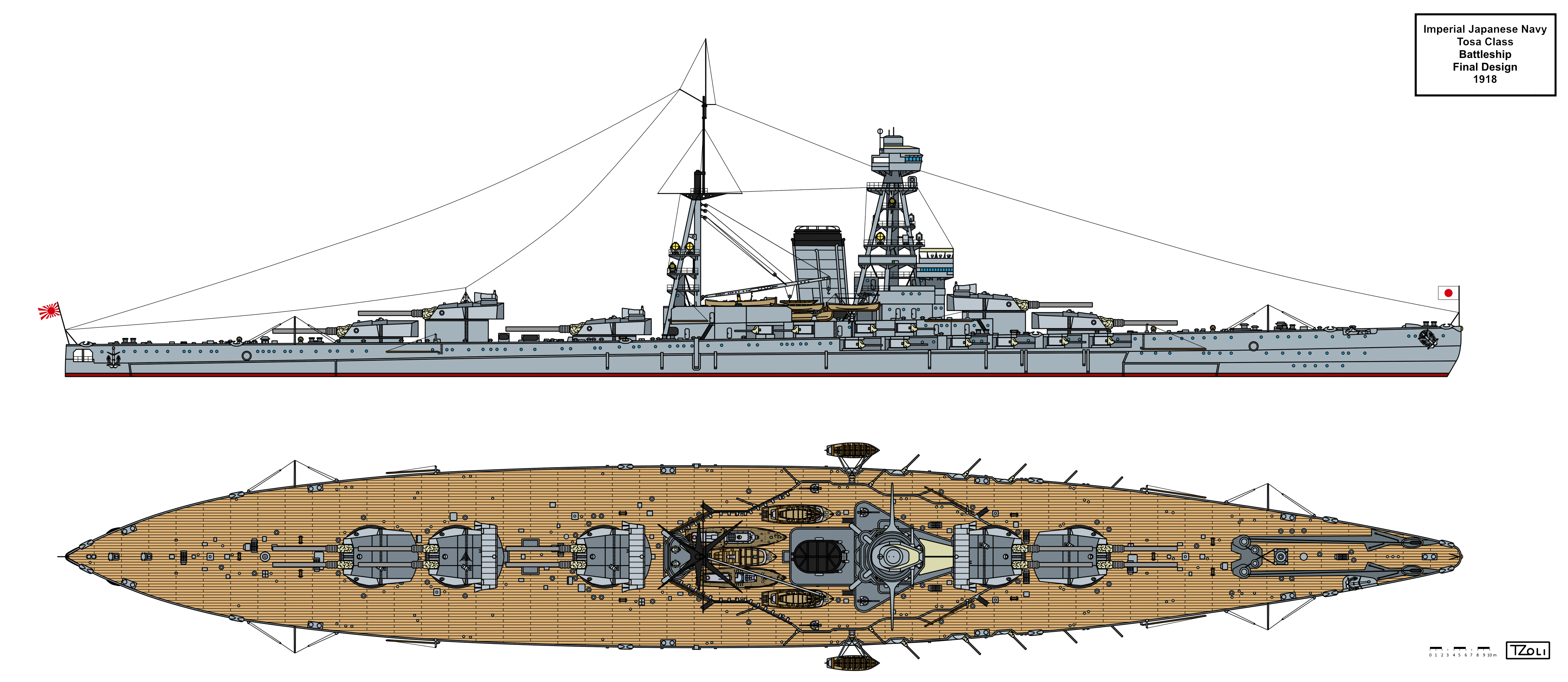
Line drawing of Tosa-class battleship

The IJN began reevaluating the Nagato design in light of lessons learned from the Battle of Jutland in May 1916, experiments evaluating armor protection, and newly acquired information on the protective schemes of British and American capital ships. These lessons highlighted the need for better protection of the main gun turrets and magazines, as well as thicker deck armor to protect against plunging fire. Existing methods of defense against mines and torpedoes had also proved to be inadequate and needed improvement. Eleven new designs were rejected between October and early 1917 before Captain Yuzuru Hiraga, superintendent of shipbuilding and the naval architect in charge of the fundamental design of the ships of the Eight-Eight Fleet, presented a heavily modified version of the Nagato design, A-125, to be built in lieu of the second ship of the class, Mutsu, on 12 June 1917, well before she was actually laid down.

Hiraga's design for the ship reflected the latest combat experience as well as incorporating advances in boiler technology. It added an extra twin main-gun turret, using space and weight made available by the reduction of the number of boilers from 21 to 12 while the power remained the same. He reduced the secondary armament from 20 guns to 16; they were moved up a deck to improve their arcs of fire and their ability to shoot during heavy weather. To increase the ship's protection he proposed to angle the belt armor outwards to improve its resistance to horizontal fire, and to thicken the lower deck armor and the torpedo bulkhead. Hiraga also planned to add anti-torpedo bulges to improve the ship's underwater protection. He estimated that his ship would displace as much as Nagato, although it would cost about a million yen more. These changes would have considerably delayed the ship's completion and were rejected by the Navy Ministry. The rejected design formed the basis for a much larger 39,000-metric-ton (38,000-long-ton) battleship, designated as A-127, with nearly twice as much armor weight as the Nagatos. It was designed to achieve the same speed as the older ships, to allow them to maneuver together as a tactical formation. This design was accepted on 27 March 1918 and became the Tosa class.

The Tosa-class ships had a planned displacement of 39,900 tonnes (39,300 long tons), and 44,200 t (43,500 long tons) at full load. They would have been 231.65 meters (760 ft) long at the waterline, and 234.09 meters (768 ft) overall; the ships would have had a beam of 30.48 meters (100 ft) and a draft of 9.39 meters (30.8 ft). The Tosa class would have had a metacentric height of 1.292 meters (4 ft 2.9 in) at normal load. A turbo-electric propulsion system was considered for these ships after the United States announced that the system was a great success in the battleship USS New Mexico, and the Japanese estimated that a 70,000-shaft-horsepower (52,000 kW) turbo-electric plant could be installed in the Tosa class, which would have given the ships a speed of 25.25 knots (46.76 km/h; 29.06 mph), a 2,500-nautical-mile (4,600 km; 2,900 mi) range at full speed, and a 7,800-nautical-mile (14,400 km; 9,000 mi) range at 14 knots (26 km/h; 16 mph), but this system was rejected. More conventional Curtis geared steam turbines were chosen, powered by 12 Kampon water-tube boilers, eight of which would have used fuel oil and four of which would have used a mixture of oil and coal. This system would have provided 91,000 shaft horsepower (68,000 kW) to four propeller shafts for a top speed of 26.5 knots (49.1 km/h; 30.5 mph). The fuel stores would have amounted to 3,600 long tons (3,700 t) of oil and 1,800 long tons (1,800 t) of coal; at a speed of 14 knots, this would have enabled a maximum range of 6,500 nautical miles (12,000 km; 7,500 mi).

=== Armament ===
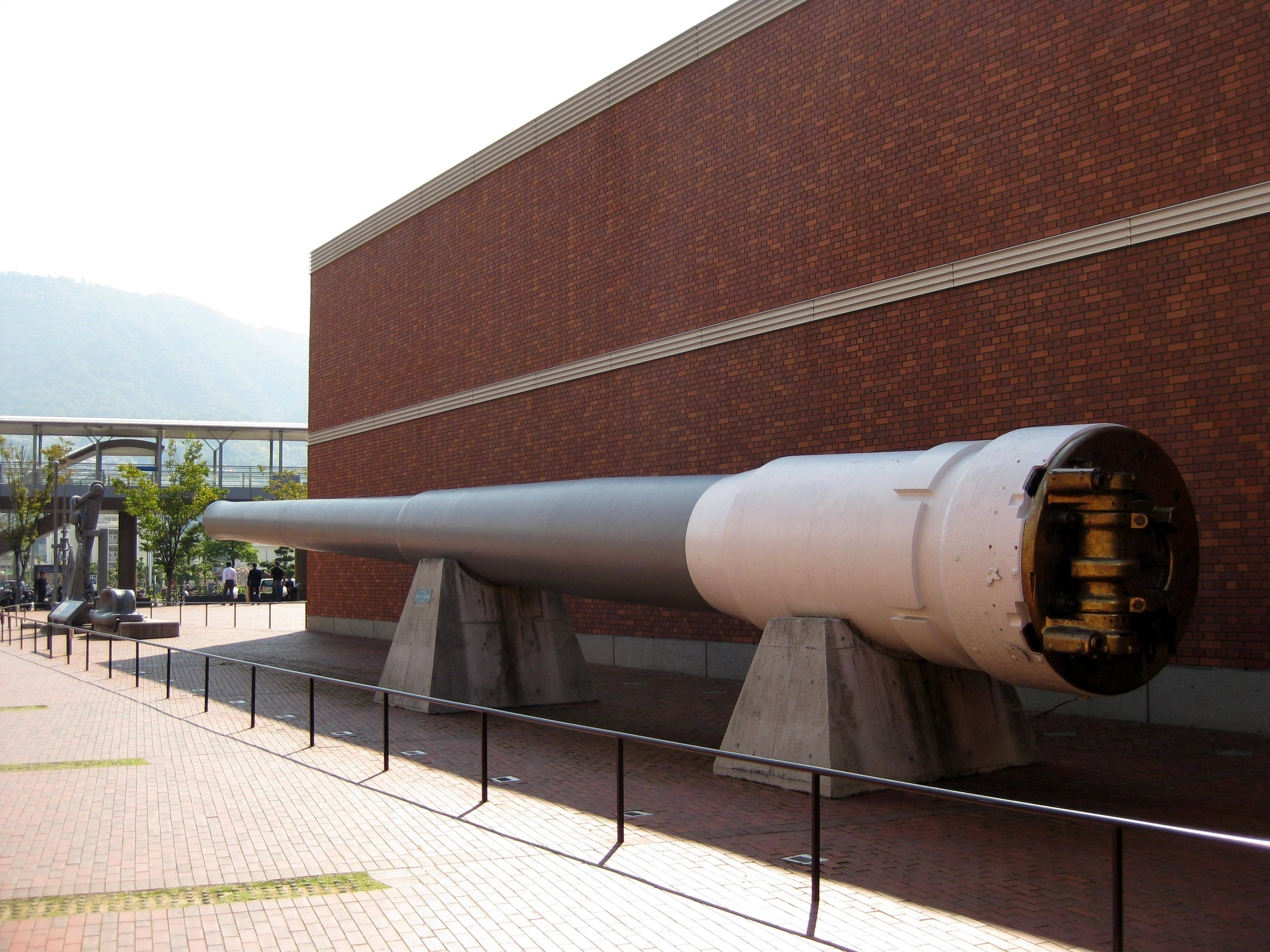
A 41 cm gun on display at the Yamato Museum in Kure, Japan

The Tosa-class ships were intended to be armed with a main battery of ten 45-caliber 41-centimeter (16.1-inch) guns in five twin turrets, four of which were superfiring fore and aft. Numbered one through five from front to rear, the hydraulically powered turrets had an elevation range of −2 to +35 degrees. The rate of fire for the guns was around two rounds per minute. The ships were designed to carry 90 rounds per gun, although space was available for 110.

The guns used Type 91 armor-piercing, capped shells. Each of these shells weighed 1,020 kilograms (2,250 lb) and had a muzzle velocity of 780 meters per second (2,600 ft/s). Also available was a 936-kilogram (2,064 lb) high-explosive shell that had a muzzle velocity of 805 meters per second (2,640 ft/s).

The ships' secondary armament of twenty 50-caliber 3rd Year Type 14-centimeter (5.5-inch) guns would have been mounted in casemates, 12 on the upper sides of the hull and eight in the superstructure. The 3rd Year Type guns had a maximum range of 19,750 meters (21,600 yd) at an elevation of +35 degrees. Each gun could fire a 38-kilogram (84 lb) high-explosive projectile at a rate up to 10 rounds per minute and was provided with 120 rounds. Anti-aircraft defense was provided by four 40-caliber 3rd Year Type 8-centimeter (Note: These guns were license-built British quick-firing (QF) 12-pounder guns. While the Japanese designated them as 8 cm, their actual caliber was 76.2 mm.) AA guns in single mounts. The 3-inch (76 mm) high-angle guns had a maximum elevation of +75 degrees, and a rate of fire of 13 to 20 rounds per minute. They fired a 6 kg (13 lb) projectile with a muzzle velocity of 680 m/s (2,200 ft/s) to a maximum height of 7,500 meters (24,600 ft). The guns were normally supplied with 250 rounds each, although space was available for a total of 400 rounds per gun. These 3rd Year Type guns were intended to be replaced by four 45-caliber 12-centimeter (4.7 in) anti-aircraft guns.

The Tosas were intended to mount eight 61-centimeter (24 in) torpedo tubes, four above water and four below. The former were to be provided with two torpedoes each and the latter with three each.

=== Armor ===
The ships' armor protection was designed to break up 16-inch (406 mm) shells from a distance of 15,000–20,000 meters (16,000–22,000 yd) and the primary armor plates were backed up by splinter bulkheads intended to contain any shell fragments. They would have been protected by a waterline main belt of Vickers cemented armor that sloped outwards 15 degrees at the top. Amidships it would have been 280 mm (11 in) thick and 254 mm (10 in) thick fore and aft. Approximately 1.83 meters (6 ft 0 in) of the armor belt was below the waterline. The side armor was closed off at its ends by bulkheads 229–254 mm (9–10 in) thick. The main battery turrets and the portions of the barbettes above the main deck would have had between 229 and 305 mm (9.0 and 12.0 in) of armor plating, and the conning tower walls would have had armor 254 and 356 mm (10.0 and 14.0 in) thick and a roof of 178 mm (7.0 in) armor plates. The communications tube below the conning tower would have had walls 76–127 mm (3.0–5.0 in) thick.

The middle deck was the primary armored deck and was connected to the top of the armor belt. It would have consisted of a 63.5 mm (2.5 in) plate of New Vickers non-cemented armor on top of a 37 mm (1.5 in) plate of high-tensile steel (HTS) above the engine and boiler rooms. Above the magazines, the thickness of the HTS plate would have increased to 63 mm. The lower deck would have consisted of two 19 mm (0.75 in) plates of HTS. For the first time in a Japanese ship, the Tosas would have had the lower portion of the single funnel protected by 229 mm of armor. In addition, the funnel openings in the lower deck would have been protected by armor gratings.

The ships would have had an internal torpedo bulge to provide protection against underwater explosions. This was backed by a torpedo bulkhead also made up of three 25 mm (0.98 in) layers of HTS and angled outwards to meet the base of the waterline belt. It connected to a 12.7–32 mm (0.50–1.26 in) splinter bulkhead on the lower deck behind the waterline belt. Behind the torpedo bulge and the splinter bulkhead was another splinter bulkhead 12.7–19 mm thick.

== Ships ==
Construction data
Name	Builder	Laid down	Launched	Completion	Fate
Tosa (土佐)	Mitsubishi Shipyard, Nagasaki	16 February 1920	18 December 1921	March 1923 (estimated)	Scuttled, 9 February 1925
Kaga (加賀)	Kawasaki Shipyard, Kobe	19 July 1920	17 November 1921	25 December 1922	Sunk during the Battle of Midway, 4 June 1942

== Cancellation and fates ==
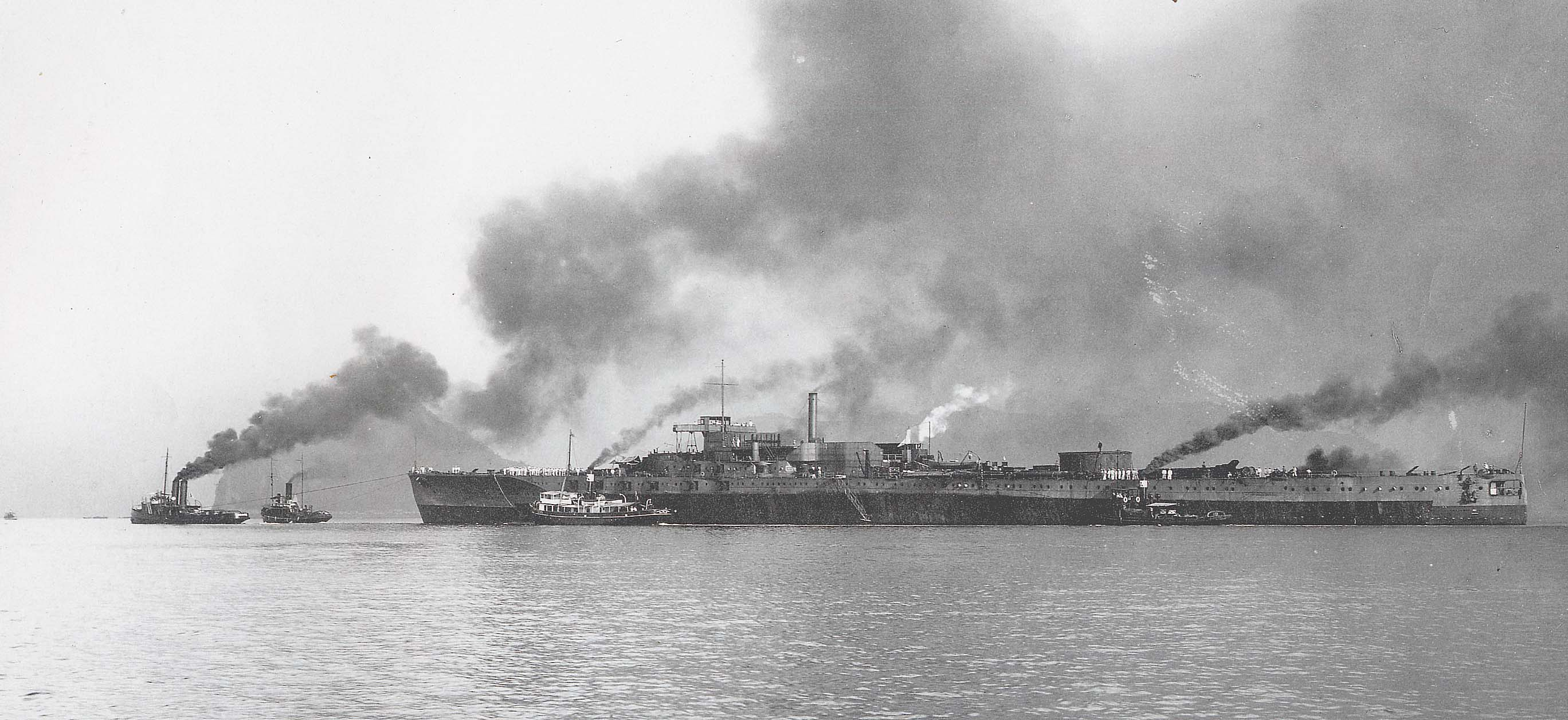
Tosa, partly complete, being towed from Nagasaki in 1922

Construction of both ships began in 1920, but the 1922 Washington Naval Treaty intervened, mandating the cancellation of all capital ships being built. Work stopped on the two Tosa-class battleships on 5 February 1922. After being stricken on 1 April 1924, Tosa's guns were turned over to the Imperial Japanese Army for use as coastal artillery; two of her main-gun turrets were installed on Tsushima Island and near Busan, Korea. The rest of her guns were placed in reserve and ultimately scrapped in 1943. Tosa's incomplete hull was used to test her armor scheme against long-range naval gunfire, aerial bombs, mines, and torpedoes. Two of the shells fired at her fell short, but deeply penetrated her hull through the thin armor of the torpedo bulge below the waterline armor belt. This sparked an interest in optimizing underwater performance of Japanese shells that culminated in production of the Type 91 armor-piercing shell. Conversely, the IJN took measures to defend against shells of this type when reconstructing its existing battleships during the 1930s, as well as in the designs of the Yamato-class battleships and the heavy cruisers of the Mogami and Tone classes. Tosa's torpedo defense system proved able to defeat 200 kg (440 lb) torpedo warheads, but not larger 350 kg (770 lb) ones. After the conclusion of the tests, the ship was scuttled by opening her Kingston valves on 9 February 1925 in 650 m (2,130 ft) of water in the Bungo Channel after the demolition charges failed to detonate.

The battlecruiser Amagi, which was being converted to an aircraft carrier under the terms of the treaty, was wrecked in the Great Kantō earthquake in 1923 and rendered unusable. As a result, Kaga, which was originally slated to be scrapped under the terms of the Washington Naval Treaty (Chapter I, Article IX), was converted in Amagi's stead. No work took place until 1925 as new plans were drafted and earthquake damage to the Yokosuka Naval Arsenal was repaired. Although the ship was commissioned on 31 March 1928, she did not join the Combined Fleet (Rengō Kantai) until 30 November 1929.

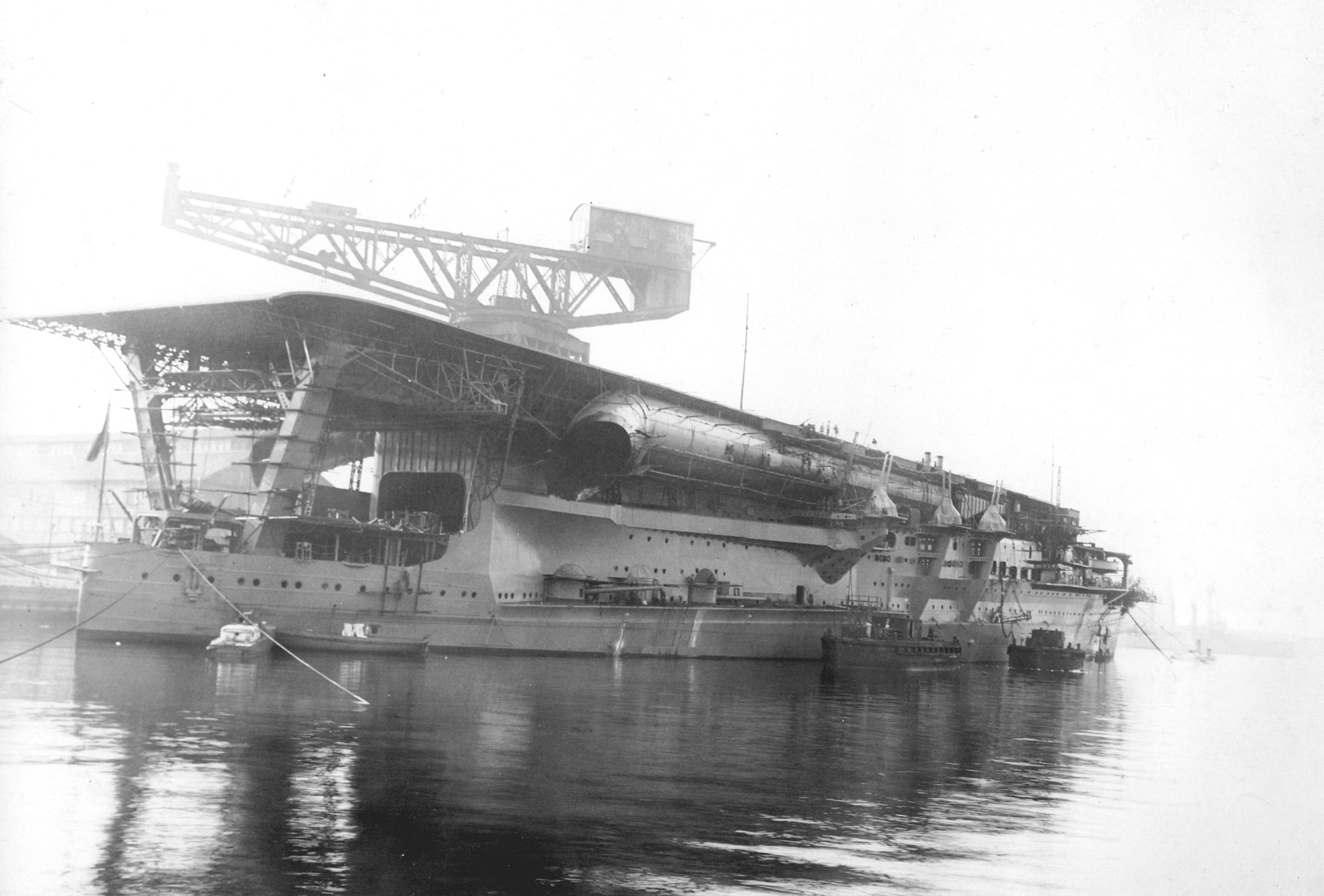
Kaga, seen from the stern, under construction in Yokosuka naval yard in November 1928; note the large pipe that directed exhaust smoke down, away from any landing aircraft

Much like the converted Amagi-class battlecruiser Akagi, Kaga was fitted with two flying-off decks "stepped down" from a flight deck that extended two-thirds of the ship; in theory, this allowed planes to take off directly from the hangars while other planes landed on the top. As aircraft became heavier during the 1930s, they required longer distances to get airborne and the lower flight decks became useless. Kaga's 1935 reconstruction removed the lower two decks and extended the top flight deck to the bow. As completed, the ship had two main hangar decks and a third auxiliary hangar with a total capacity of 60 aircraft.

Kaga was provided with a heavy gun armament in case she was surprised by enemy cruisers and forced to give battle, but her large and vulnerable flight deck, hangars, and other features made her more of a target in any surface action than a fighting warship. Carrier doctrine was still evolving at this time and the impracticability of carriers engaging in gun duels had not yet been realized. The ship was armed with ten 20 cm/50 3rd Year Type guns: one twin-gun turret on each side of the middle flight deck and six in casemates aft. Kaga's waterline armored belt was reduced from 280 to 152 mm (11.0 to 6.0 in) during her reconstruction and her deck armor was also reduced from 102 to 38 mm (4.0 to 1.5 in). The carrier displaced 26,900 long tons (27,300 t) at standard load, and 33,693 long tons (34,234 t) at full load, nearly 6,000 long tons (6,100 t) less than her designed displacement as a battleship. This reduction in her displacement increased her speed to 27.5 knots (50.9 km/h; 31.6 mph) and gave her a range of 8,000 nautical miles (15,000 km; 9,200 mi) at 14 knots (26 km/h; 16 mph).

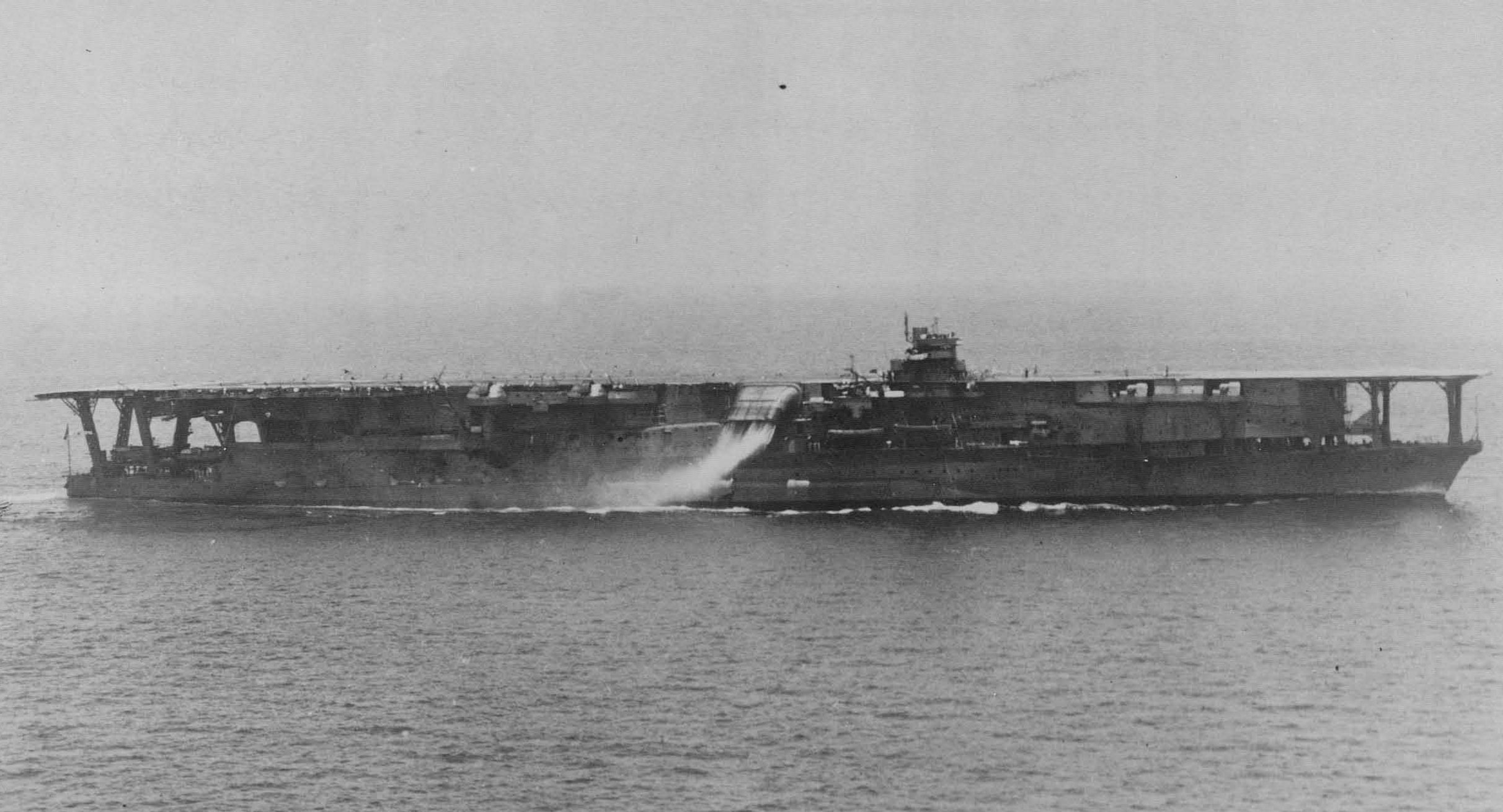
Kaga after her 1930s reconstruction

In 1933–35 Kaga was rebuilt to increase her top speed, improve her exhaust systems, and adapt her flight decks to more modern, heavier aircraft. After the reconstruction, the ship displaced 38,200 long tons (38,800 t) at standard load, better boilers gave her a top speed of 28.3 knots (52.4 km/h; 32.6 mph), and additional fuel storage increased her range to 10,000 nautical miles (19,000 km; 12,000 mi) at 15 knots (28 km/h; 17 mph) and raised her aircraft capacity to 90. The ten 20 cm (7.9 in) guns, although now all mounted singly in casemates, were retained.

Kaga's aircraft first supported Japanese troops in China during the Shanghai Incident of 1932 and participated in the Second Sino-Japanese War in the late 1930s. With five other fleet carriers, she took part in the Pearl Harbor raid in December 1941 and the invasion of Rabaul in the Southwest Pacific in January 1942. The following month her aircraft participated in a combined carrier airstrike on Darwin, Australia, helping secure the conquest of the Dutch East Indies by Japanese forces. She missed the Indian Ocean raid in April as she had to return to Japan for repairs after hitting a reef in February. Following repairs, Kaga rejoined the 1st Air Fleet for the attack on Midway Atoll in June 1942.

The IJN was surprised by the appearance of three American carriers and, partly due to Admiral Isoroku Yamamoto's plan in which ships were too dispersed to support each other, Kaga, along with the other three carriers present, was sunk by aircraft from USS Enterprise, Hornet and Yorktown on 4 June.
