= Kii-class battleship =

Japanese class of battleships

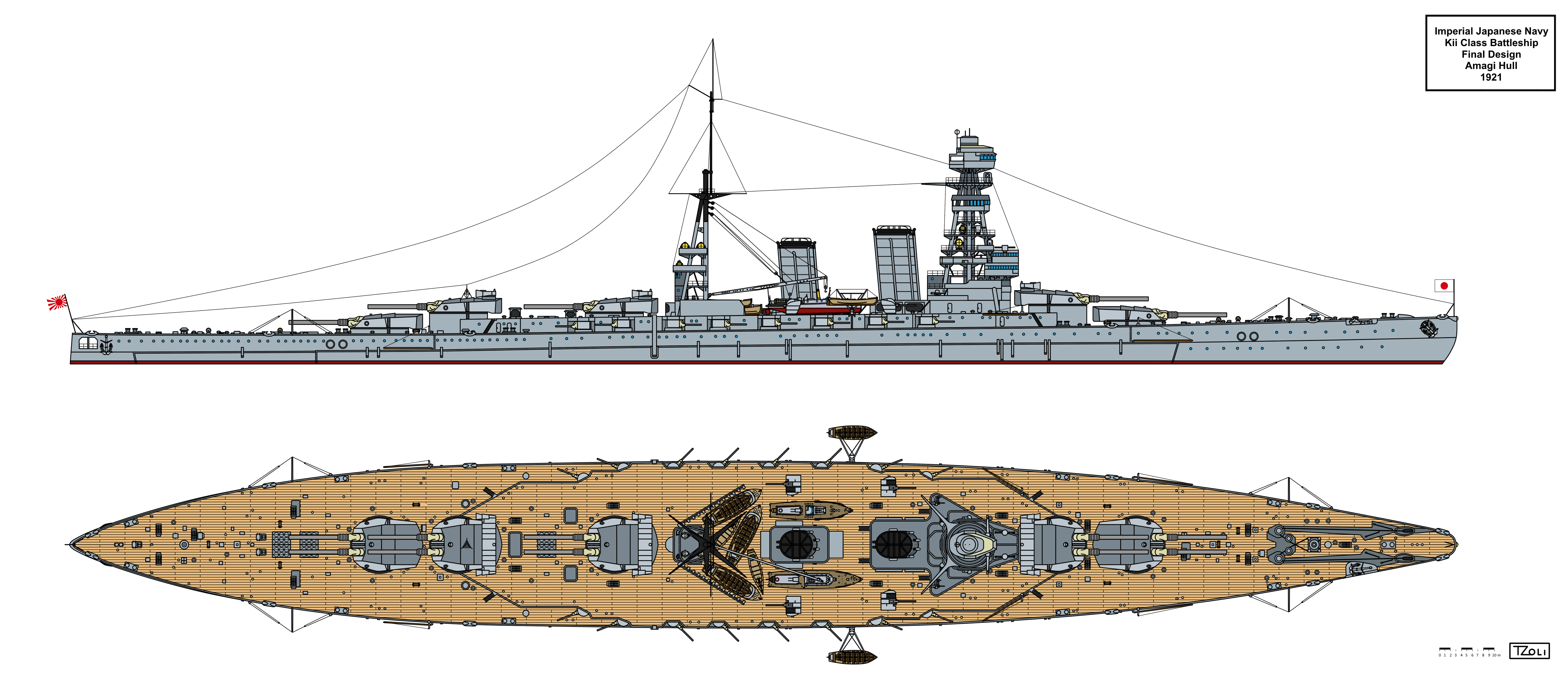
- Illustration of the Kii-class battleship

Class overview
- Name: Kii class
- Builders: Kure Naval Arsenal; Yokosuka Naval Arsenal; Kawasaki Shipyard, Kobe; Mitsubishi Shipyard, Nagasaki
- Operators: Imperial Japanese Navy
- Preceded by: Tosa class
- Succeeded by: Number 13 class
- Planned: 4
- Canceled: 4

General characteristics
- Type: Fast battleship
- Displacement: 42,600 t (41,900 long tons) (normal); 48,500 t (47,700 long tons) (full load)
- Length: 250 m (820 ft 3 in)
- Beam: 30.8 m (101 ft 1 in)
- Draft: 9.7 m (31 ft 10 in)
- Installed power: 19 × water-tube boilers; 131,200 shp (97,800 kW)
- Propulsion: 4 × shafts; 4 × geared steam turbines
- Speed: 29.75 knots (55.10 km/h; 34.24 mph)
- Range: 8,000 nmi (15,000 km; 9,200 mi) at 14 knots (26 km/h; 16 mph)
- Armament: 5 × twin 41 cm (16.1 in) guns; 16 × single 14 cm (5.5 in) guns; 4 × single 12 cm (4.7 in) AA guns; 8 × 61 cm (24 in) torpedo tubes
- Armor: Waterline belt: 292 mm (11.5 in); Deck: 120 mm (4.7 in); Barbettes: 229–280 mm (9–11 in); Conning tower: 356 mm (14 in)

The Kii-class battleship (Japanese: 紀伊型戦艦, romanized: Kii-gata senkan, lit. 'Era') was a planned class of four fast battleships to be built for the Imperial Japanese Navy (IJN) during the 1920s. Only two of the ships received names. They were intended to reinforce Japan's "eight-eight fleet" of eight battleships and eight battlecruisers after the United States announced a major naval construction program in 1919. However, after the signing of the Washington Naval Treaty in 1922, work on the ships was suspended; one pair was cancelled in November 1923 and the other in April 1924.

== Design and background ==
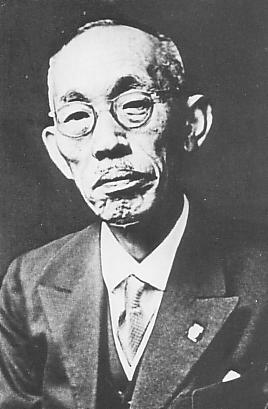
Yuzuru Hiraga

By 1918, the Navy had gained approval for an "eight-six" fleet of eight battleships and six battlecruisers, all ships under eight years old. However, having four large battleships (two each of the Nagato and Tosa classes) and four Amagi-class battlecruisers on order put an enormous financial strain on Japan, which was spending about a third of its national budget on the Navy. Despite this, the IJN gained approval of the "eight-eight-eight" plan in 1920 after American President Woodrow Wilson announced plans in 1919 to re-initiate the 1916 plan for ten additional battleships and six battlecruisers. The Japanese response was to plan the construction of eight additional fast battleships in the Kii and the Number 13 classes.

Designed by Captain Yuzuru Hiraga, the Kii class was based largely on the preceding Amagi-class battlecruisers, which were in turn based on a less-armored Tosa-class design. The only major difference between the Kiis and Amagis was their speed and armor—the Amagis were faster, and the Kiis had a thicker belt. Despite this lineage, the Kiis were classified as "fast battleships" by the Japanese, as they had decided to end the distinction between "battleship" and "battlecruiser."

=== Description ===
The ships had a length of 234.9 meters (770 ft 8 in) between perpendiculars and 250.1 meters (820 ft 6 in) overall. They had a beam of 30.8 meters (101 ft 1 in) and a draft of 9.7 meters (31 ft 10 in). The normal displacement of the battleships was 42,600 metric tons (41,900 long tons).

The class was intended to be equipped with four Gijutsu-Hombu geared steam turbines, each of which drove one propeller shaft. The turbines were designed to produce a total of 131,200 shaft horsepower (97,800 kW), using steam provided by 19 Kampon oil-fired water-tube boilers, to reach a maximum speed of 29.75 knots (55.10 km/h; 34.24 mph).

The primary armament of the Kii class was ten 45-caliber 41-centimetre (16.1 in) guns in five twin-gun turrets, two fore and three aft of the superstructure. This gun fired a 1,000-kilogram (2,200 lb) shell at a muzzle velocity of 790 meters per second (2,600 ft/s). The secondary battery consisted of 16 single 50-caliber 14-centimetre (5.5 in) guns was mounted in casemates in the superstructure. The manually operated guns had a maximum range of 19,750 meters (21,600 yd) at an elevation of +35° and fired at a rate up to 10 rounds per minute. The ships' anti-aircraft defenses consisted of four single 45-caliber 12-centimetre (4.7 in) 10th Year Type anti-aircraft guns mounted around the single funnel. Each of these guns had a maximum elevation of +75° and a maximum rate of fire of 10–11 rounds per minute. They could fire a 20.41-kilogram (45.0 lb) projectile with a muzzle velocity of 825–830 m/s (2,710–2,720 ft/s) to a maximum height of 10,000 meters (32,808 ft). The Kii class was also fitted with eight 61-centimeter (24 in) above-water torpedo tubes, four on each broadside.

The ships would have been protected by a waterline belt of armor 292 millimeters (11.5 in) thick, sloped 15° outwards at the top to increase its ability to resist penetration at short range. The belt armor was designed to be able to defeat 16-inch (410 mm) shells from a distance of 12,000–20,000 meters (13,000–22,000 yd). The main battery turrets and barbettes would have had between 229–280 millimeters (9.0–11.0 in) of armor plating, and the conning tower would have had been protected by armor 356 millimeters (14 in) thick. The decks would have been 120 mm thick. The Kii-class battleships would have had a torpedo bulkhead 75 millimeters (3 in) thick, which connected at the top to a 38-millimeter (1.5 in) splinter deck beneath the main deck.

== Construction ==
Two ships were ordered on 12 October 1921, and two more were ordered later that year. Kii was allocated to Kure Naval Arsenal, Kure, with a projected completion date of November 1923, and Owari (尾張, an ancient province) was allocated to the Yokosuka Naval Arsenal, Yokosuka, with completion in September. Two more unnamed ships, Numbers 11 and 12, were assigned to Kawasaki in Kobe and Mitsubishi in Nagasaki, respectively. The ships' keel laying was stopped on 5 February because the terms of the Washington Naval Treaty that forbade the construction of all battleships over 35,000 long tons (36,000 t). Numbers 11 and 12 were formally canceled on 19 November 1923; Kii and Owari followed on 14 April 1924.
