= 41 cm/45 3rd Year Type naval gun =

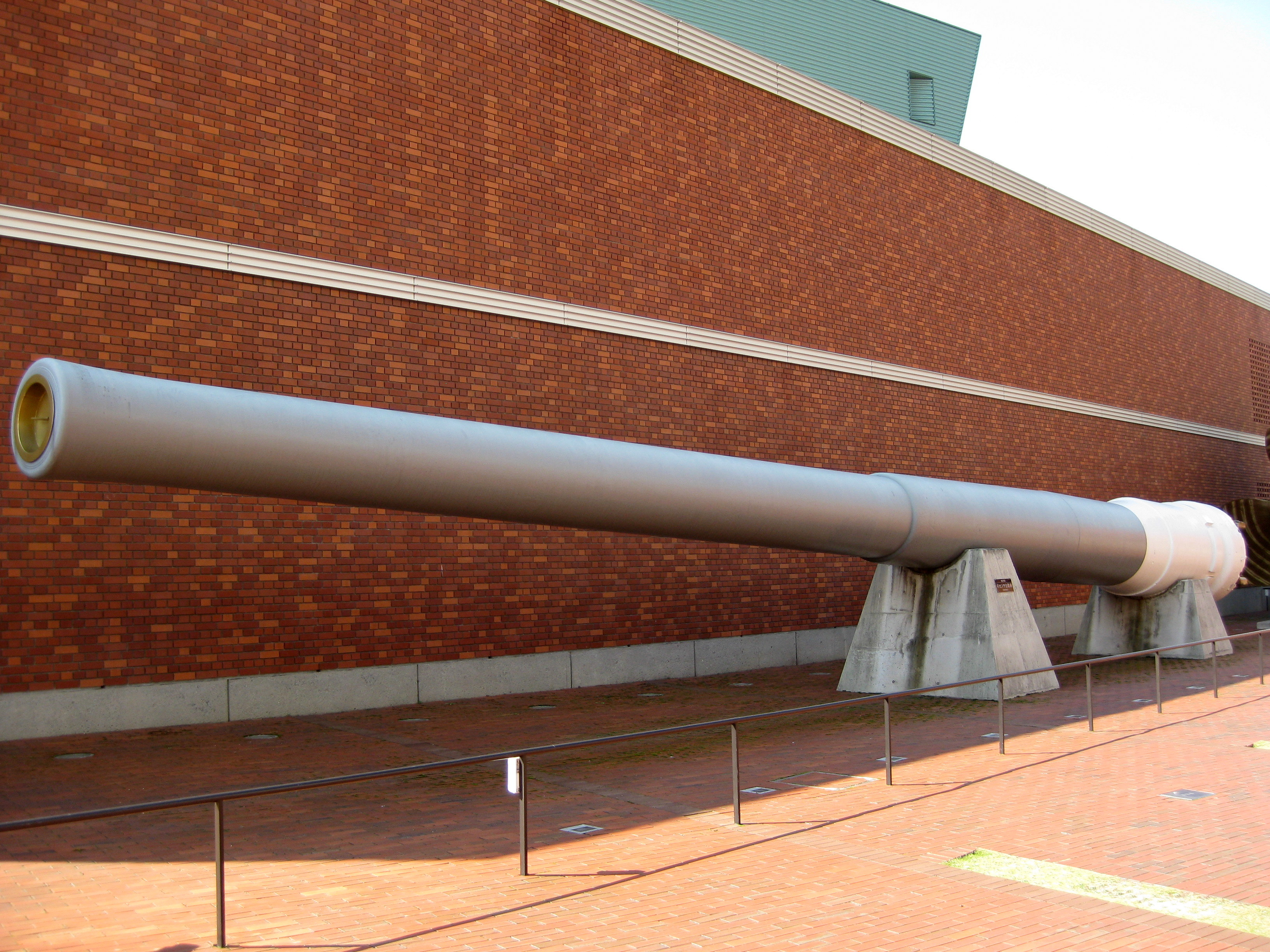
- 41 cm/45 3rd Year Type naval gun from the battleship Mutsu outside the Yamato Museum
- Type: Naval gun Coast-defense gun
- Place of origin: Japan

Service history
- In service: 1920–1945
- Used by: Imperial Japanese Navy
- Wars: World War II

Production history
- No. built: about 40

Specifications
- Mass: 102,000 kilograms (224,872 lb)
- Length: 18.84 meters (61 ft 10 in)
- Barrel length: 18.394 meters (60 ft 4.2 in) (45 calibers)
- Shell: Separate-loading, bagged charge
- Shell weight: 1,020 kilograms (2,250 lb)
- Caliber: 41 centimeters (16.1 in)
- Breech: Welin breech block
- Elevation: –2° to +35° (later –3° to +43°)
- Rate of fire: 1 round per 24 seconds
- Muzzle velocity: 780–790 meters per second (2,600–2,600 ft/s)
- Effective firing range: 30,200 meters (33,000 yd)
- Maximum firing range: 38,400 meters (42,000 yd)

The 41 cm/45 3rd Year Type naval gun is a 41-centimeter (16.1 in) breech-loading naval gun designed during World War I for the Imperial Japanese Navy. It served as the primary armament in the Nagato-class dreadnoughts completed after the end of the war and in coast defense mountings. Two turrets and their guns were salvaged during the 1970s from the wreck of the Japanese battleship Mutsu and are on display in Japan.

== Description ==
The gun was of wire-wound construction and had an overall length of 18.84 meters (61 ft 10 in) with a bore 18.394 meters (60 ft 4.2 in) long. It weighed 102,000 kilograms (224,872 lb), including the Welin-type breech. This used the Elswick three-motion short-arm mechanism, much like the British BL 18 inch Mk I naval gun designed around the same time. Chamber volume was 467.11 litres (28,505 cu in).

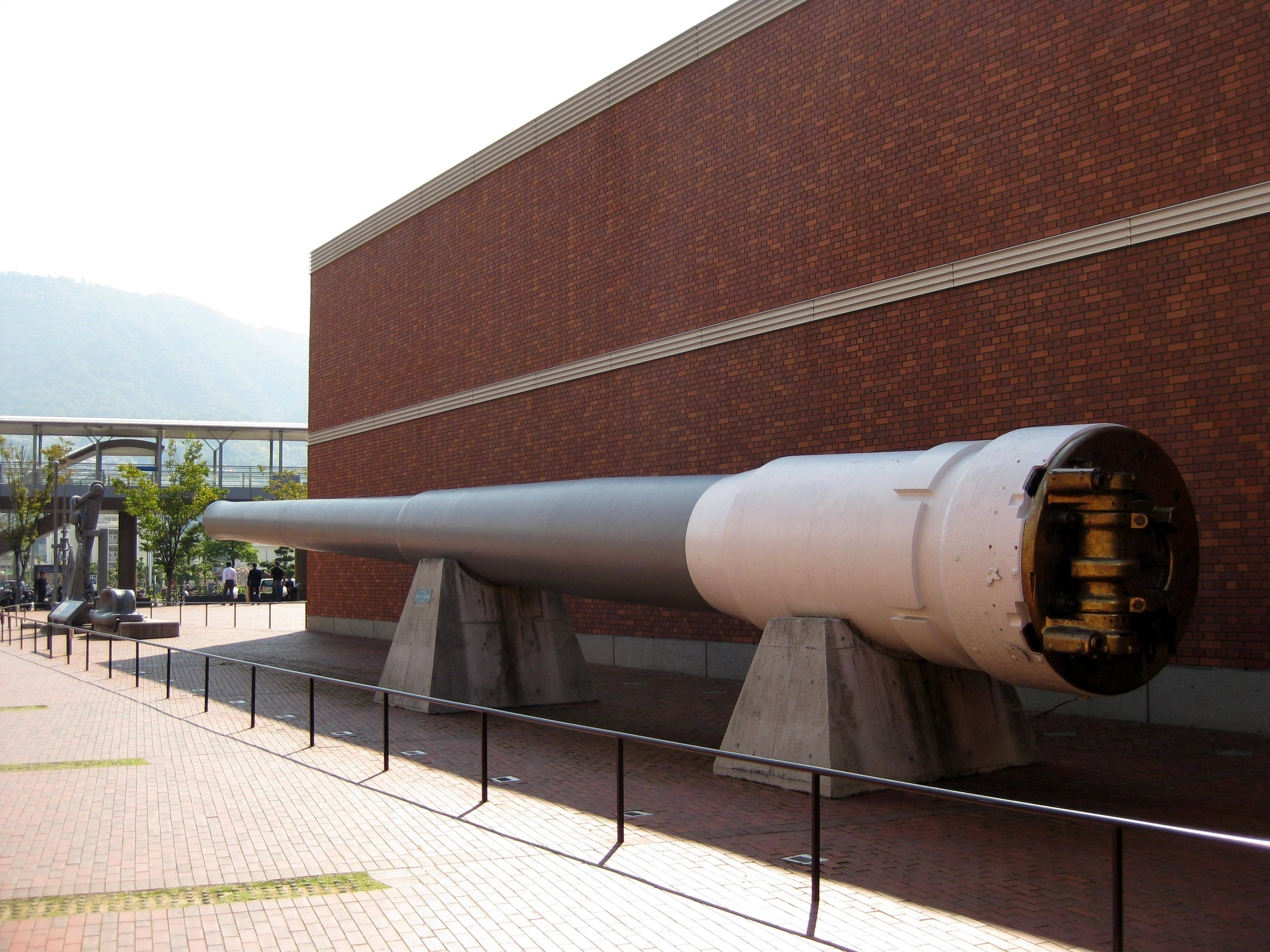
Rear view of the gun on display at the Yamato Museum

Initially the gun was fitted in twin-gun turrets that had an elevation range of –2°/+35°. It was initially equipped with the Type 88 1,000-kilogram (2,200 lb) armor-piercing, capped (APC) shell, that had a muzzle velocity of 790 m/s (2,600 ft/s). This was superseded in 1931 by the Type 91 shell that weighed 1,020 kilograms (2,250 lb). It was fired at a muzzle velocity of 790 m/s (2,600 ft/s) to a range of 30,200 meters (33,000 yd). Also available was a 936-kilogram (2,064 lb) high-explosive shell that had a muzzle velocity of 805 meters per second (2,640 ft/s). A special Type 3 Sankaidan incendiary shrapnel shell was developed in the 1930s for anti-aircraft use. The gun's firing cycle was one round every 24 seconds.

The turrets aboard the Nagato-class ships were replaced in the mid-1930s, using the turrets stored from the unfinished Tosa-class battleships. While in storage the turrets were modified to increase their range of elevation to –3°/+43°, which gave them a maximum range of 37,900 meters (41,400 yd), and their firing cycle was reduced to 21.5 seconds.

The gun was only initially known as the 41 cm/45 3rd Year Type naval gun before it was redesignated as the 40 cm/45 3rd Year Type naval gun (official designation: 45 caliber 3rd Year Type 40 cm Gun) on 29 March 1922 to comply with the terms of the Washington Naval Treaty which forbade guns larger than 40.6 cm (16 in). Third year type refers to the Welin breech block on which design began in 1914, the third year of the Taishō period. This breech block design was also used on the 20 cm (7.9 inch), 15.5 cm (6.1 inch), 14 cm (5.5 inch), 12.7 cm (5 inch), and 12 cm (4.7 inch) naval guns.

== Service ==
The Nagato-class dreadnoughts were the only ships to use this gun, although it would have been used by the Tosa-class and Kii-class dreadnoughts as well as the Amagi-class battlecruisers had they not been cancelled due to the Washington Naval Treaty of 1922. The gun was also deployed in three coast-defense turrets intended to close off the Strait of Tsushima. One turret each was deployed on Iki and Tsushima Islands while the third was mounted in Pusan, Korea.

Mutsu's original number 4 turret, removed during her interwar refit, is on display on the grounds of the former Imperial Japanese Naval Academy at Etajima, Hiroshima, where it was placed as a training aid in the 1930s. The two aft turrets from Mutsu's wreck were salvaged in the 1970s; No. 4 in July or August 1970 and No. 3 in September of the following year. Both were scrapped. One gun from Turret No. 3 is at the Kure Maritime Museum, popularly known as the Yamato Museum, in Kure, Hiroshima while the other is at the Museum of Maritime Science in Odaiba, Tokyo.

== Shells into bombs ==
Obsolete Type 88 shells were modified in 1939–40 to create the Type 99 No. 80 Mk 5 armor-piercing bomb used during the attack on Pearl Harbor. The armor-piercing cap and windscreen were removed, the body was machined down and tapered to reduce weight and a new, thinner, base plug installed with two fuzes. The filling was replaced by 23 kilograms (50 lb) of trinitroanisole and the bomb weighed 796.8 kilograms (1,757 lb).

Beginning in 1942 an improved version of the bomb was built. Its nose was much less thick and it contained 35.7 kilograms (79 lb) of trinitroanisole. It weighed 811.2 kilograms (1,788 lb).

== See also ==
=== Weapons of comparable role, performance and era ===
- BL 16 inch Mk I naval gun: British equivalent
- 16"/45 caliber Mk 1, 5 & 8 gun: American equivalent
