= Yuzuru Hiraga =

Japanese naval officer and Doctor in Engineering (1878-1943)

Baron Yuzuru Hiraga
- 平賀 譲
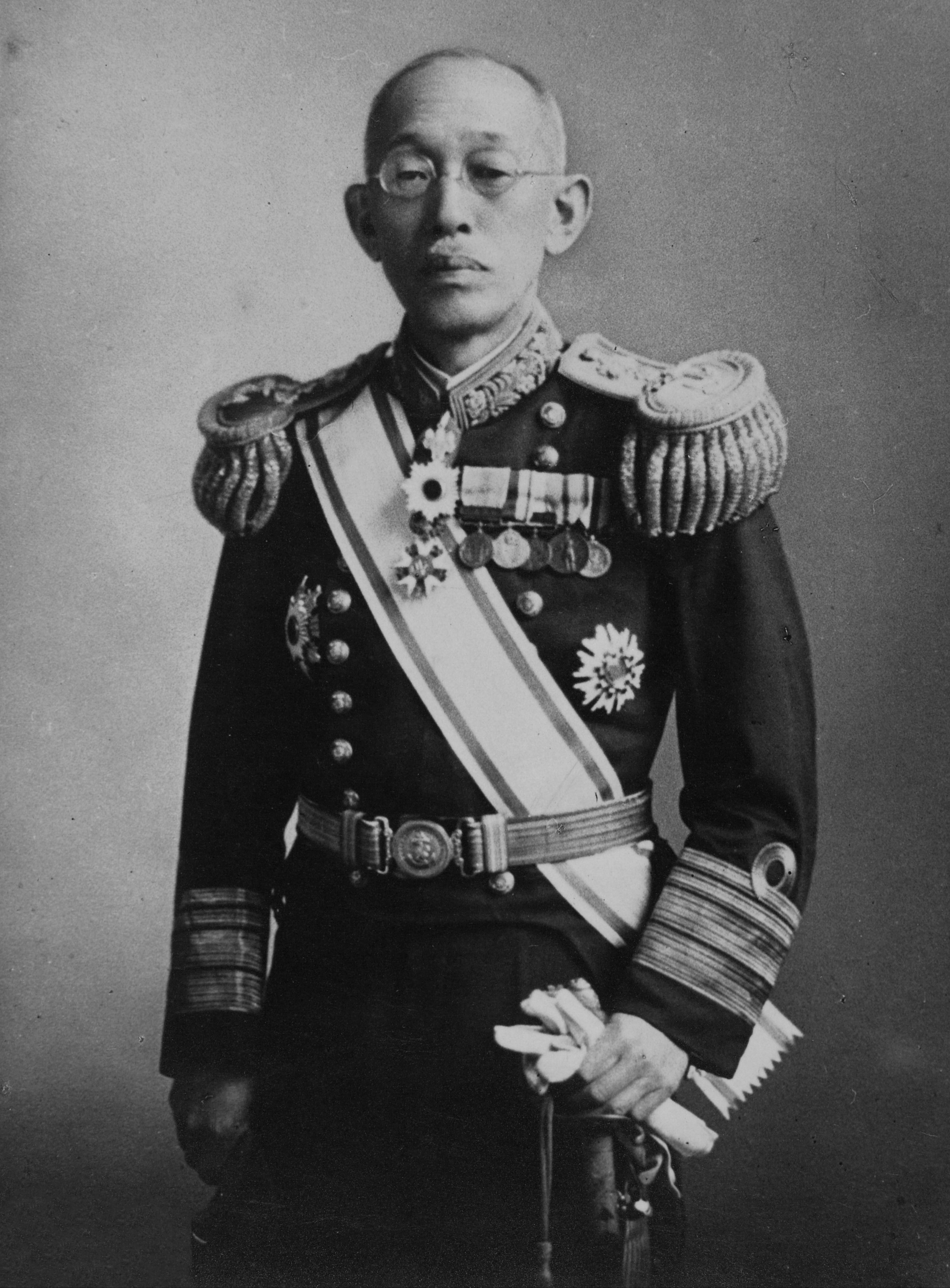
- Born: March 8, 1878; Tokyo, Japan
- Died: February 17, 1943 (aged 64); Tokyo, Japan
- Military career
- Allegiance: Empire of Japan
- Branch: Imperial Japanese Navy
- Service years: 1901–1931
- Rank: Vice Admiral
- Awards: Order of the Sacred Treasure; Order of the Rising Sun

Vice Admiral Baron Yuzuru Hiraga (平賀 譲, Hiraga Yuzuru; March 8, 1878 – February 17, 1943) was a career naval officer in the Imperial Japanese Navy, Doctor of Engineering and head of the engineering school of Tokyo Imperial University and a leading Japanese naval architect in the 1910s and 1920s, responsible for designing a number of famous warships, many of which would later see action during World War II. He participated in establishing the Chiba Institute of Technology from 1941.

== Biography ==
Hiraga was born in Tokyo and grew up in Yokosuka, Kanagawa although his family was from Hiroshima, where his official family registration was located. He graduated from what is now Hibiya High School, and entered the engineering department of Tokyo Imperial University in 1898, specializing in marine engineering. He was drafted into the Imperial Japanese Navy in 1899, but allowed to continue his studies, and graduated in 1901 as a sub-lieutenant. He immediately went to work for the Yokosuka Naval Arsenal as a design engineer for new warships. Promoted to lieutenant on 28 September 1903, he was transferred to the Kure Naval Arsenal in 1905.

From 1905, at the height of the Russo-Japanese War, Hiraga was dispatched to the United Kingdom for further studies. He left Yokohama in January, and travelling across the Pacific Ocean, the United States and the Atlantic Ocean, he arrived in London in April. From October, he was enrolled in the Royal Naval College, Greenwich, where he studied the latest techniques in warship design. He graduated in June 1908, and spent the next six months touring various shipyards in France and Italy before returning to Japan in early 1909. In September of the same year, he became a professor of engineering at Tokyo Imperial University, and was promoted to lieutenant-commander on 1 October.

In 1912, Hiraga was head of the design team for the new battleship Yamashiro, and the conversion of Hiei from battlecruiser into a battleship. He also worked on the designs for the Kaba-class destroyers, and received promotion to commander on 1 December.

In 1913, Hiraga became Director of Shipyards for the Imperial Japanese Navy. He was awarded the Order of the Sacred Treasure (4th class) on 28 November. He was awarded the 3rd class degree of the same decoration on 7 November 1915 for his work in ramping up the efficiency of Japanese shipyards to meet the order demands of the Allies of World War I, and the 2nd class degree on 25 February 1926.

In 1916, Hiraga became chief engineering director for the Navy's ambitious Eight-eight fleet project, and began work on a series of high speed battleships and cruisers. On 1 April 1917, he was promoted to the rank of captain, and to rear admiral on 1 June 1922. On 7 November 1920, he was awarded the third class of the Order of the Rising Sun. The innovative cruiser Yubari, largely designed by Hiraga, was commissioned in 1923.

Hiraga was appointed a technical advisor to the Japanese delegation at the Washington Naval Conference, and was in the United States from November 1923 to August 1924, becoming head of the Imperial Japanese Navy Technical Department on his return. He was promoted to vice admiral in 1926.

Hiraga assembled a team of engineers to rebuild the Japanese navy in the aftermath of the terms imposed by the Washington Naval Treaty, which severely restricted designs in terms of displacement and numbers of large capital warships. The innovative designs for cruisers and destroyers formulated by Hiraga, which were extraordinarily powerful for their size, were among the most advanced in the world. Hiraga concentrated on ways to fit as much weaponry and equipment as possible into a treaty-compliant hull. (i.e. under 10,000 tons standard displacement). However, not content with these advancements, the Imperial Japanese Navy General Staff overruled Hiraga’s technical objections, and ordered that even more weaponry be added. In the case of Mogami-class cruisers, fifteen 6.1-inch (150 mm) guns were mounted on a hull with a nominal displacement of only 8,500 tons. This raised technical questions overseas on how such designs were possible within the limitations of the Washington Treaty. It was only later revealed that these designs were only possible through generous underestimation of the vessel’s true displacement, and sacrifices in terms of safety. “They must be building their ships out of cardboard or lying” said the Royal Navy’s Director of Naval Construction (DNC) in 1935 when briefed by Naval Intelligence about the public displacement figure announced by the Japanese.

In 1929, after Hiraga's design for the Kii-class battleship was shelved, he went into semi-retirement, and retired from active military service in 1930, becoming an advisor to Mitsubishi shipyards.

In April 1934, Hiraga faced a board of inquiry after the Tomozuru Incident, a marine accident involving the torpedo boat Tomozuru, which overturned and capsized during trials at the Sasebo Naval Arsenal. Resulting investigation revealed what a number of Western engineers had long suspected: Hiraga's designs were top-heavy and tended towards instability. The Tomozuru Incident sent shock waves through the Japanese military, as it called into question the safety and basic design concepts of the most modern warships in the Japanese inventory. Hiraga's reputation suffered a further setback due to the Fourth Fleet Incident, in which many destroyers of the Hiraga-designed Fubuki-class destroyers were so damaged in a typhoon that the whole class had to be reconstructed. However, Hiraga's engineering expertise and designs were eventually vindicated in the investigation, and subsequently appointed to the design team for the superbattleship Yamato.

In December 1938, Hiraga became the President of Tokyo Imperial University. In 1939, he conducted what journalists later termed the "Hiraga Purge", by expelling most of the faculty of the university’s School of Economics, for publicly supporting liberal political doctrines. On February 17, 1943, Hiraga died at Tokyo University Hospital of complications arising from pneumonia. He was posthumously awarded with the Grand Cordon of the Order of the Rising Sun and also with the kazoku peerage title of baron.

His brain was removed on his death, and is preserved at the Tokyo University Hospital. His grave is at the Tama Reien in Fuchū, Tokyo.
