= Eight-Eight Fleet =

Japanese naval armament strategy

The Eight-Eight Fleet Program (八八艦隊, Hachihachi Kantai) was a Japanese naval strategy formulated for the development of the Imperial Japanese Navy in the first quarter of the 20th century, which stipulated that the navy should include eight first-class battleships and eight armoured cruisers or battlecruisers.

== History and development ==
The concept of the "Eight-Eight Fleet" originated in the aftermath of the Russo-Japanese War with the 1907 Imperial Defense Policy between the Japanese government and the competing services of the Army and Navy. The policy called for the construction of a battle fleet of eight modern battleships of 20,000 tons each and eight modern armored cruisers of 18,000 tons each. These were to be complemented by the construction of several lesser warship types, including cruisers and destroyers. The plan was inspired by the Mahanian doctrine of Satō Tetsutarō who advocated that Japanese security could only be guaranteed by a strong navy. Satō argued that to ensure security, Japan should be capable of defeating the power which represented the greatest hypothetical threat. In the 1907 Imperial National Defense Policy, Japan's military focus shifted away from Tsarist Russia and towards the United States, who now became the primary hypothetical threat to Japan's future security. In 1907, no clash of fundamental interests between Japan and the United States existed nor was there any indication that either the Japanese or the American government desired confrontation. The Imperial Defense Policy of 1907 promoted Japan's big-navy ideology in complete disregard of the realities of Japanese foreign policy. Far from providing a rationale for an eight-eight fleet by a detailed explanation of an American naval threat, the policy arbitrarily selected the United States as a likely opponent in order to justify the scale of naval strength it desired. More than Japan's most likely antagonist, the U.S. Navy became the Imperial Japanese navy's "budgetary enemy".

Based on a theoretical United States Navy strength of 25 battleships and cruisers, Japanese naval theoreticians postulated that Japan would need a fleet of at least eight first-line battleships and eight cruisers for parity in the Pacific Ocean. When Naval Minister Admiral Yamamoto Gonnohyoe presented the budget request for this fleet to the Diet of Japan, the amount was more than twice that of the entire Japanese national budget at the time.

The Eight-Eight Fleet policy was controversial because of the enormous cost of battleships, and only once was authorization given by the Diet of Japan for a building program which would have reached the "Eight-Eight Fleet" ideal. To complicate matters further, while the "Eight-Eight Fleet" plan lasted over a decade, the ships required for it changed; by 1920 the ships which had been ordered in 1910 to start to fulfill the plan were becoming obsolete.

Various alternative plans were discussed, including a reduction in the plan to an "Eight-Four Fleet" program, or later to an "Eight-Six Fleet" program.

=== First "Eight-Eight" ===
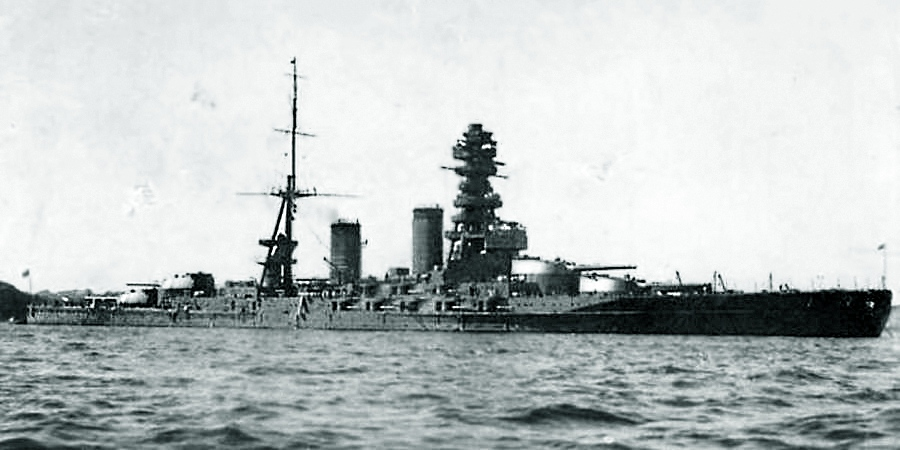
Mutsu, a Nagato-class dreadnought battleship, at anchor, shortly after completion.

The first serious attempt to build an "Eight-Eight Fleet" came in 1910, when the Naval General Staff proposed a building program of eight battleships and eight armored cruisers (by that time, they would inevitably become battlecruisers). The Navy Ministry cut back this request for political reasons, to seven battleships and three armored cruisers. The Cabinet eventually recommended one battleship and four battlecruisers, and the Diet authorized these ships in 1911. The battlecruisers became the Kongō class and the battleship was Fusō: all were technologically advanced ships.

The 1913 program saw a further three battleships authorized, making a total of "four-four". These ships, Yamashiro, Ise and Hyūga, were sister ships or cousins of Fusō.

In 1915, the Navy proposed another four battleships, to reach an "Eight-Four Fleet". This was rejected by the Diet. However, in 1916 the Diet agreed to an additional battleship and two battlecruisers. In 1917, in response to the U.S. Navy's plan to build an additional ten battleships and six battlecruisers, the Diet authorized a further three battleships; and in 1918 the Cabinet authorized another two battlecruisers. In total, the authorization existed for an "Eight-Eight Fleet".

The new ships started were the two Nagato-class battleships, the two Tosa-class battleships, and a total of four Amagi-class battlecruisers: all modern, capable ships carrying 16-inch guns. Only the two Nagato-class ships were eventually completed in their intended role. One Tosa and one Amagi were completed as aircraft carriers Kaga and Akagi.

=== Second "Eight-Eight Fleet" ===
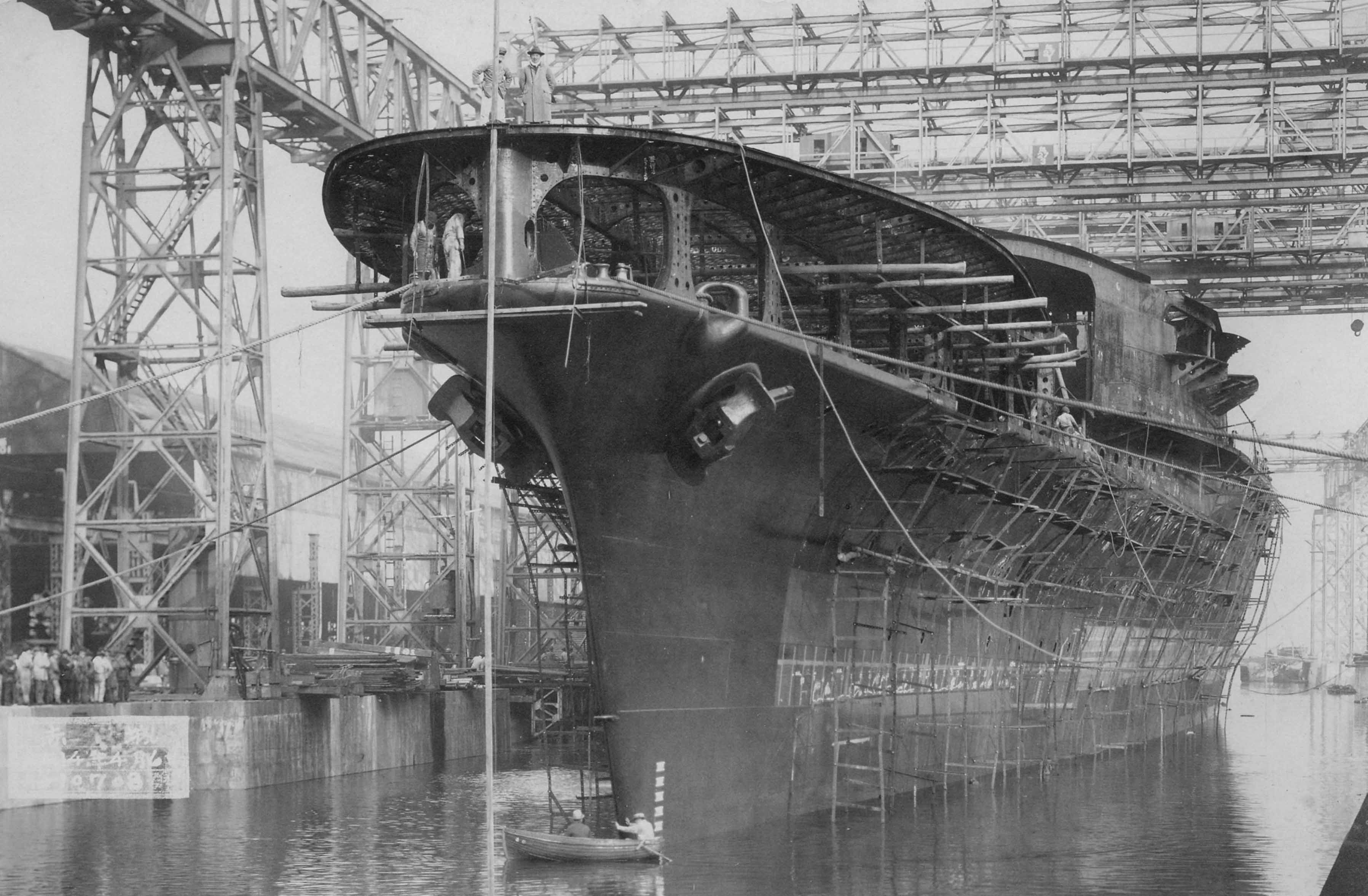
Akagi (A former Japanese battlecruiser converted to an aircraft carrier) being relaunched in April 1925.

So great was the difference in capability between this generation of ships and those of five years previously that the "Eight-Eight Fleet" plan was restarted: Nagato was now regarded as Ship No.1 in the new project, and planners now began to write off the older battleships and battlecruisers. On this revised basis the Navy was back down to a "Four-Four Fleet".

A further impetus to achieve the Eight-Eight Fleet ideal came from an additional expansion of the U.S. Navy under American President Woodrow Wilson's 1919 plan to build another set of 16 capital ships (on top of the 16 already authorized in 1916). In 1920, under Prime Minister Hara Takashi, a reluctant Diet was persuaded to accept a plan to bring the "Four-Four" set of modern ships up to "Eight-Eight" strength by 1927. This would have involved augmenting the Amagi-class battlecruisers with an additional four fast battleships of the new Kii class, which were marginally slower and more powerful. A further four battleships (No. 13-16) would have been built, with 18-inch guns. If completed, this would have been an "Eight-Eight Fleet" in full; if one included the oldest ships of the navy, the Fusō, Ise and Kongō classes, then the even higher goal of an "Eight-Eight-Eight Fleet" with not two but three eight-ship battle squadrons could be realized.

== Washington Naval Treaty ==
The Washington Naval Treaty of 1922 put an end to these construction plans. Under the terms of the treaty all the ships still being built — which meant all ships started after Nagato, the first ship of the 1916 building program — had to be broken up or converted into aircraft carriers. A special exemption was made for the battleship Mutsu, which was nearing completion and which had a special place in many Japanese hearts, with many of the funds for her construction raised by public subscription.

The treaty established a maximum tonnage for the Japanese navy as 60% of the U.S. Navy and the British Royal Navy. For this reason, it was vociferously opposed by many Imperial Japanese Navy officers, including Admiral Satō Tetsutarō. This group formed the influential Fleet Faction which later achieved Japan's withdrawal from the treaty. Ironically, the treaty restricted British and American ship building programs much more than Japanese due to the difference in industrial capability.

Although Japanese Navy procurement still proceeded along the lines of initial "Eight-Eight Fleet" plans for several years, changes in naval strategy and the development of naval aviation made the term an anachronism by the 1930s.

== See also ==
- Six-Six Fleet
- 600-ship Navy

== Sources ==
- Breyer, Siegfried; Alfred Kurti (2002). Battleships and Battle Cruisers, 1905-1970: Historical Development of the Capital Ship. Doubleday & Co. ISBN 0-385-07247-3.
- Evans, David C.; Peattie, Mark R. (1997). Kaigun: Strategy, Tactics, and Technology in the Imperial Japanese Navy, 1887-1941. US Naval Institute Press. ISBN 0-87021-192-7.
- Gow, Ian (2004). Military Intervention in Pre-War Japanese Politics: Admiral Kato Kanji and the Washington System'. RoutledgeCurzon. ISBN 0700713158.
- Jordan, John (2011). Warships after Washington: The Development of Five Major Fleets 1922–1930. Seaforth Publishing. ISBN 978-1-84832-117-5.
- Lengerer, Hans (2020). "The Eight-Eight Fleet and the Tosa Trials". In Jordan, John (ed.). Warship 2020. Oxford, UK: Osprey. pp. 28–47. ISBN 978-1-4728-4071-4.
- Stille, Mark (2014). The Imperial Japanese Navy in the Pacific War. Osprey Publishing. ISBN 978-1-47280-146-3.
- Weinberg, Gerhard L. (2005). A World at Arms. Cambridge University Press. ISBN 0-521-85316-8.
