= Yokosuka Naval Arsenal =

Japanese shipyard

Coordinates: 35.29°N 139.66°E

- Yokosuka, Kanagawa Prefecture, Japan
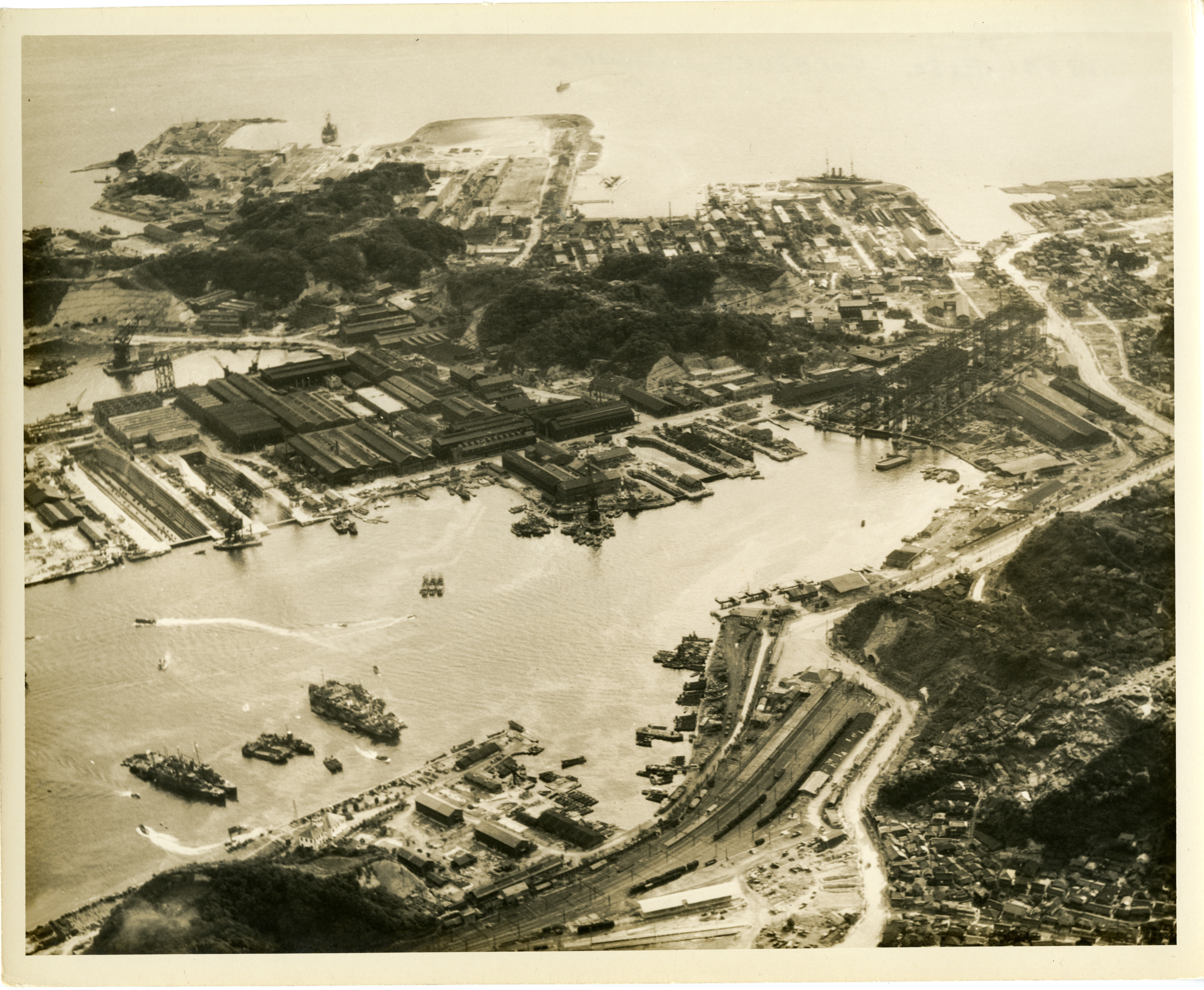
- Yokosuka Naval Arsenal (c. 1944-1945)

Site information
- Type: Shipyard
- Controlled by: Imperial Japanese Navy

Site history
- Built: 1866
- In use: 1866–1945

Yokosuka Naval Arsenal (横須賀海軍工廠, Yokosuka kaigun kōshō) was one of four principal naval shipyards owned and operated by the Imperial Japanese Navy, and was located at Yokosuka, Kanagawa Prefecture on Tokyo Bay, south of Yokohama.

== History ==
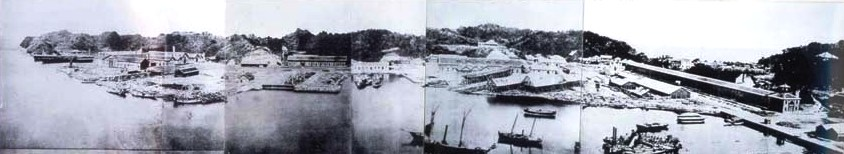
Construction of the Yokosuka arsenal c.1870.

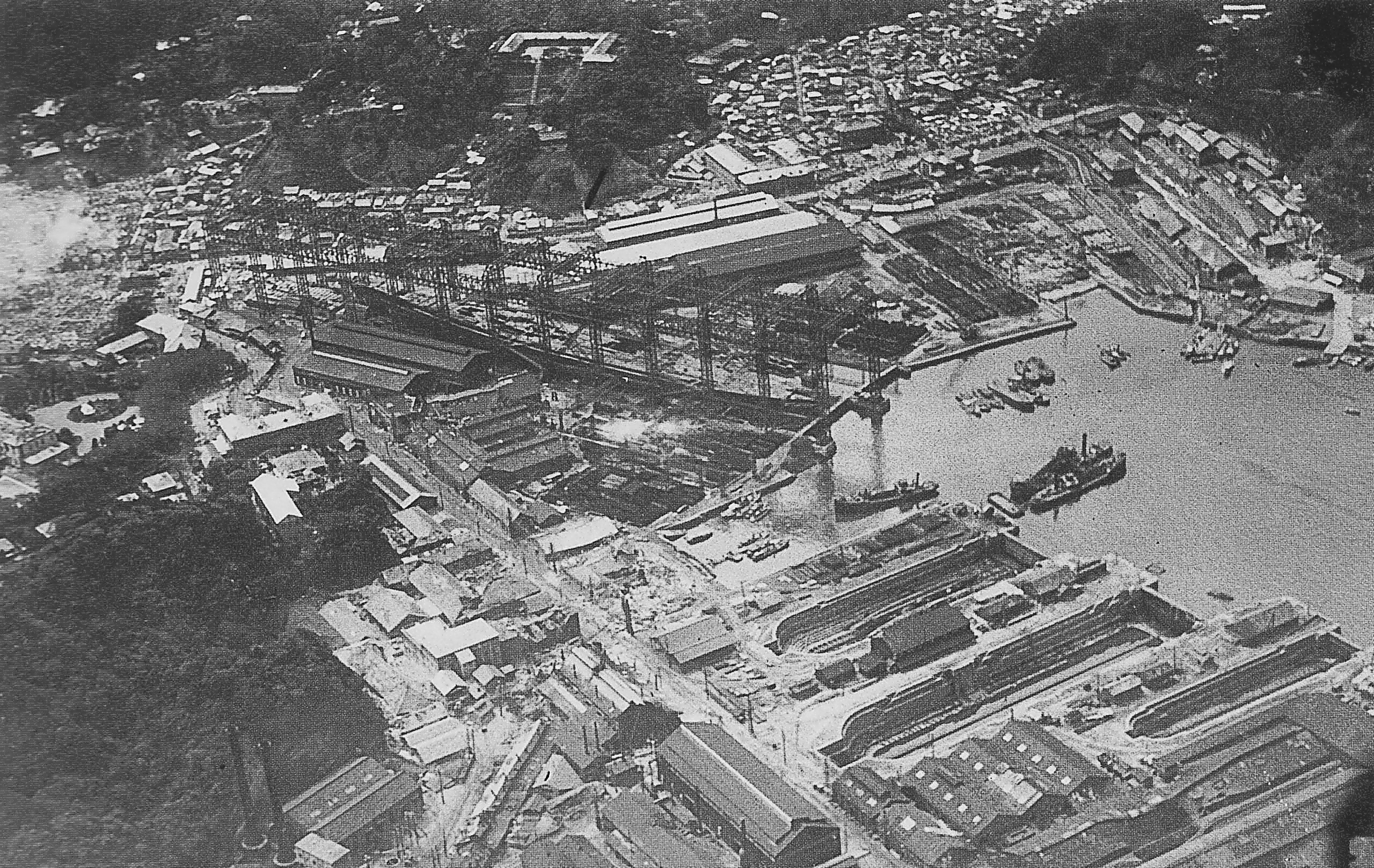
Yokosuka Naval Arsenal immediately after the Great Kantō earthquake of 1923

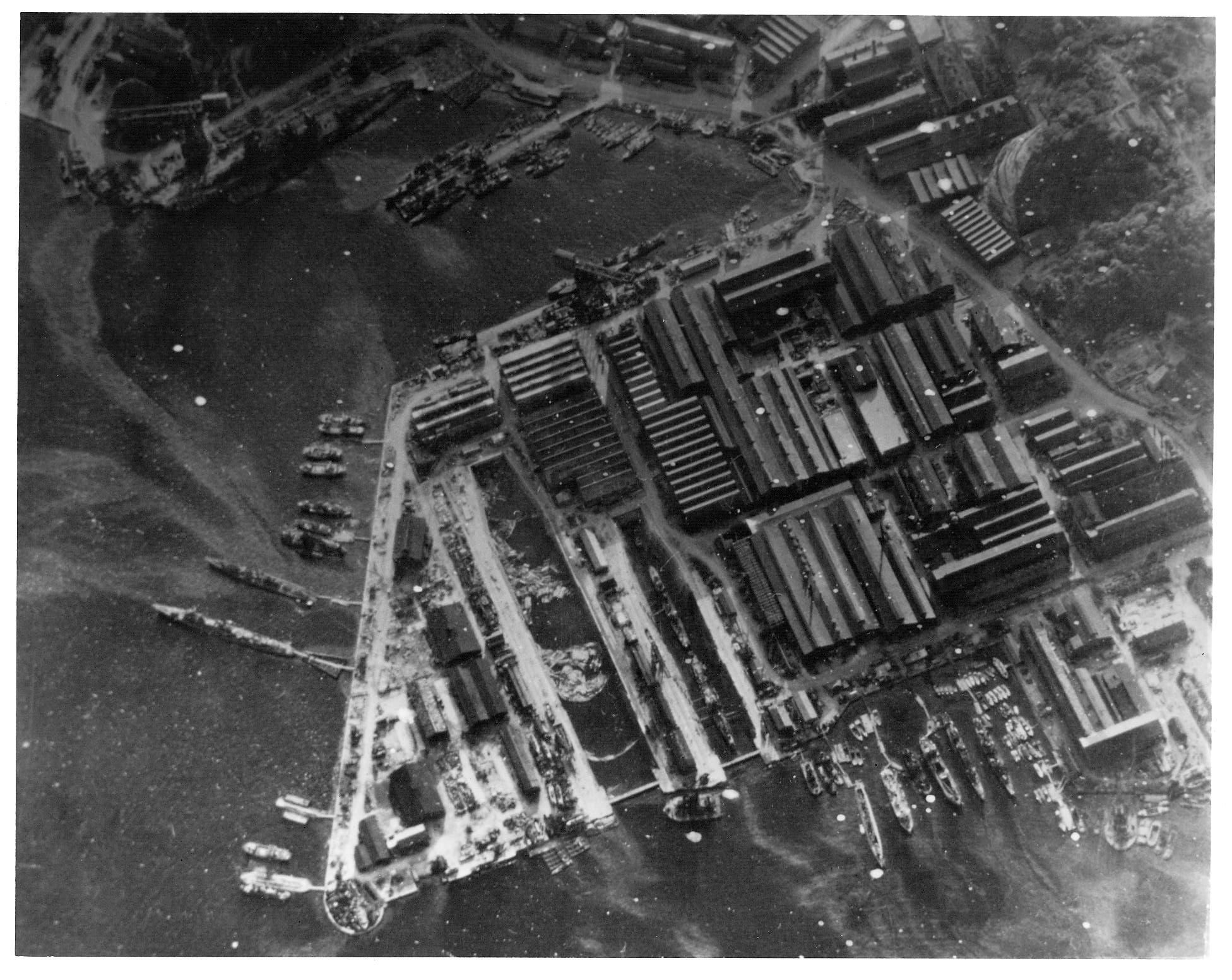
Yokosuka Naval Base in July 18, 1945

In 1866, the Tokugawa shogunate government established the Yokosuka Seisakusho, a military arsenal and naval base, with the help of foreign engineers, including the French naval architect Léonce Verny. The new facility was intended to produce modern, western-style warships and equipment for the Tokugawa navy. The construction of the arsenal was an important first step for the modernization of Japan's industry. Modern buildings, an aqueduct, foundry, brick factories, and technical schools to train Japanese technicians were established.

After the Boshin War and the Meiji Restoration, the new Meiji government took over control of the facility in 1871, renaming it the Yokosuka Zosenjo (Yokosuka Shipyards). The first dry dock was opened in 1871, and is still in operation today. Japan's first domestically produced warship, Saiki, was completed the same year.

The Yokosuka Naval District was established at Yokosuka, Kanagawa, in 1884, as the first of the naval districts responsible for the defense of the Japanese home islands, and the Yokosuka Shipyards was renamed the Yokosuka Naval Arsenal in 1903. Japan had purchased five submarines from the American Electric Boat Company during the Russo-Japanese War of 1904–1905. These Holland Type VII submarines were built by Arthur Leopold Busch as he traveled to Japan during this time. Busch was a naval architect and shipbuilder who represented the newly organized company Electric Boat Company, now located at the Quincy, Massachusetts shipyard known as the Fore River Ship and Engine Company. These first five submarines became Japan's (IJN) initial entry into the theater of underwater warfare that began nearly the same time as the outbreak of the war. Another representative of Electric Boat, Frank Cable, an electrician working for Isaac L. Rice's company, trained two Japanese crews in the operation of such craft.

Arthur Busch was also the man responsible for building the United States Navy's first submarine some five or so years before this time for the Holland Torpedo Boat Company. This particular craft was named the USS Holland (SS-1) and was America's first commissioned craft of this type. Two additional Holland-designed submarines were built for Japan by 1906 "under contract" and a licensing "agreement" with Holland's company back in 1905. These pioneering submarines progressively got larger and larger as time went on, climaxing (in size) by the end of the Cold War. In 1909, Japan's first domestically designed and produced battleship, Satsuma, was launched.

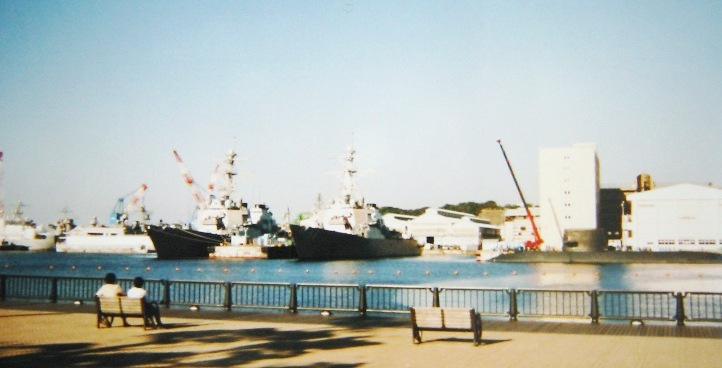
The U.S. Navy base at the former Yokosuka Naval Arsenal (2004)

Yokosuka became one of the main shipyards of the Imperial Japanese Navy in the 20th century, building numerous battleships such as Yamashiro, and aircraft carriers such as Hiryū and Shōkaku. Naval aircraft were designed at the nearby Yokosuka Naval Air Technical Arsenal.

During the Pacific War, the Yokosuka Naval Arsenal was attacked by one bomber during the Doolittle Raid on 18 April 1942 and by a large force of carrier aircraft during the Attack on Yokosuka on 18 July 1945. The facilities were seized by Allied forces at the end of World War II, and on 15 October 1945 the Yokosuka Naval Arsenal was officially abolished.

The facilities were used after World War II by the U.S. Navy as the Yokosuka Ship Repair Facility, and its former property is now under the control of the U.S. Fleet Activities Yokosuka.

A steam hammer from the former Yokosuka Naval Arsenal is on display at the Verny Commemorative Museum in Yokosuka.

== Examples of ships built at Yokosuka Naval Arsenal ==
=== Capital ships ===
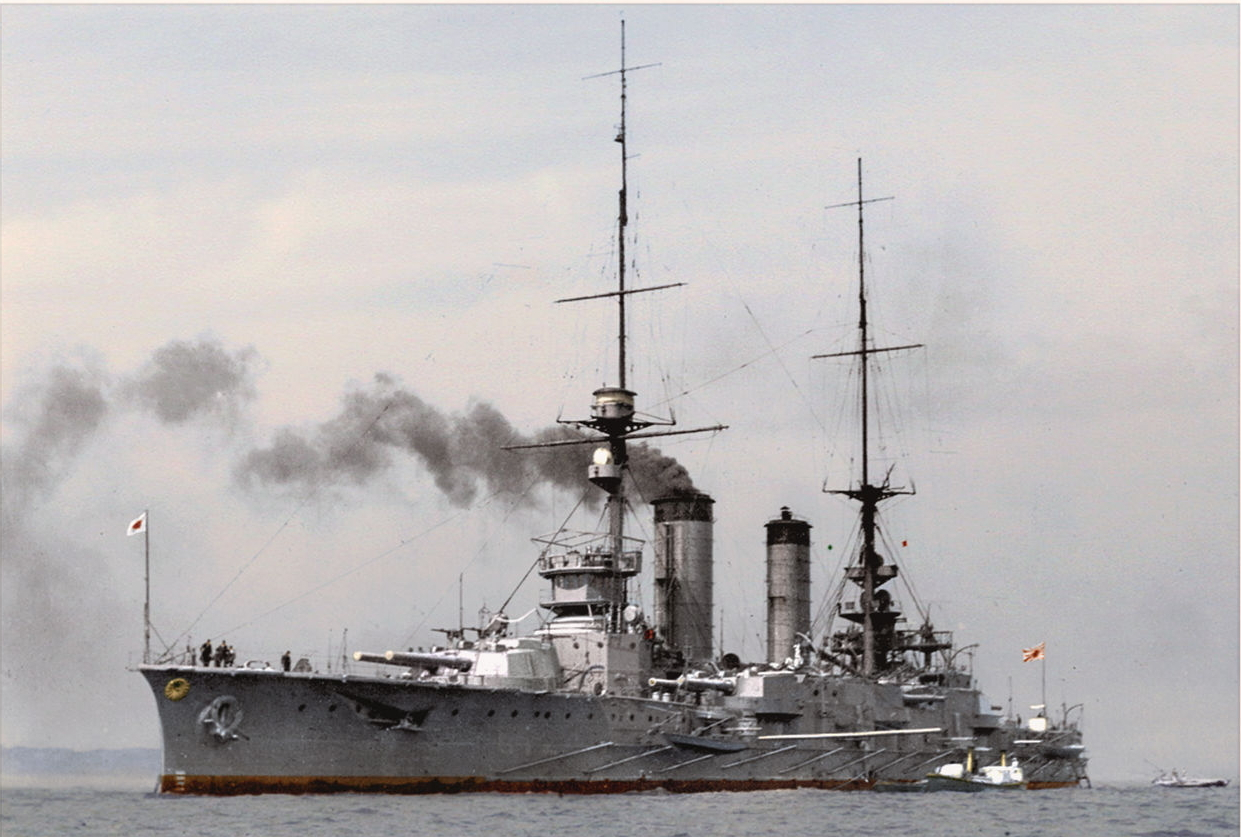
The Satsuma, Japan first indigenous battleship

==== Battleship ====
Satsuma, Satsuma-class semi-dreadnought
Yamashiro, Fusō-class battleship
Owari (Unfinished), Kii-class battleship
Mutsu, Nagato-class battleship

=== Battlecruiser ===
Kurama, Ibuki-class armoured cruiser
Hiei, Kongō-class battlecruiser
Amagi (Unfinished), Amagi-class battlecruiser

==== Fleet Aircraft Carriers ====
Fleet carrier Hiryū

Shōkaku, Shōkaku-class fleet carrier

Unryū, Unryū-class fleet carrier

Fleet carrier Kaga, converted Tosa-class battleship

==== Support Aircraft Carriers ====
Shinano, converted from Yamato-class battleship

=== Smaller ships ===
==== Cruisers ====
Myōkō, Myōkō-class Heavy cruiser
Takao, Takao-class Heavy cruiser
Suzuya, Mogami-class Heavy cruiser
Hashidate, Matsushima-class Protected cruiser
Tenryū, Tenryū-class Light cruiser
Noshiro, Agano-class Light cruiser

==== Light Carriers ====
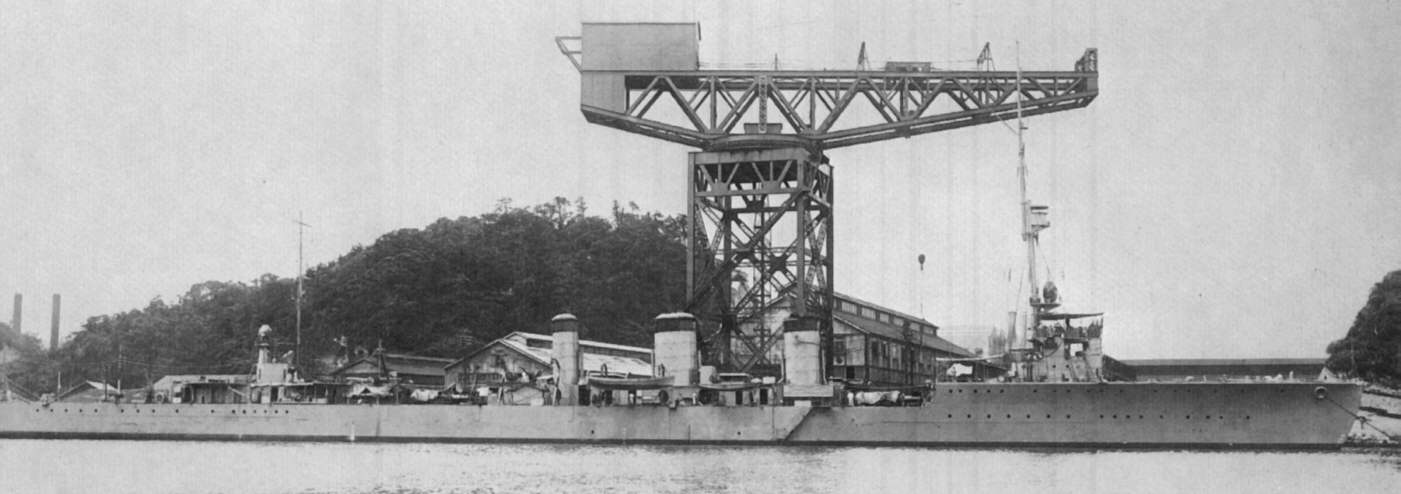
Tenryū under construction at Yokosuka Naval Arsenal

Shōhō, Zuihō-class Light carrier

Converted carrier Ryūhō

==== Destroyers Classes ====
Harusame-class: 4 ships
Kamikaze-class(1905): 8 ships
Matsu/Tachibana-class: 26 ships

==== Submarine Classes ====
Type B (Type B, B Kai-1, Kai-2): 9 ships
Type D (Type D and D Kai): 6 ships
Kaidai (Kaidai IIIa, IIIb, VII): 6 ships
Kaichū (Kaichu III, IV): 5 ships
