= Index of Japan-related articles (L) =

This page lists Japan-related articles with romanized titles beginning with the letter L. For names of people, please list by surname (i.e., "Tarō Yamada" should be listed under "Y", not "T"). Please also ignore particles (e.g. "a", "an", "the") when listing articles (i.e., "A City with No People" should be listed under "City").

== L ==
- L'Arc-en-Ciel

== La ==
- La Blue Girl
- La Pérouse Strait
- Labor unions in Japan
- Lacquerware
- Lady Ise
- Lady Saigō
- Lady Tsukiyama
- Lafcadio Hearn
- Lake Biwa
- Lake Kizaki
- Lake Mashū
- Lake Towada
- Lakitu
- Lan Di
- Language minority students in Japanese classrooms
- Lansing–Ishii Agreement
- The Last Blade
- The Last Samurai
- Late Tokugawa shogunate
- Lavos

== Le ==
- Legend of the Galactic Heroes
- Legend of the Overfiend
- The Legend of Zelda
- The Legend of Zelda: A Link to the Past
- The Legend of Zelda: Collector's Edition
- The Legend of Zelda: Four Swords Plus
- The Legend of Zelda: Link's Awakening
- The Legend of Zelda: Majora's Mask
- The Legend of Zelda: Ocarina of Time
- The Legend of Zelda: Ocarina of Time Master Quest
- The Legend of Zelda: Oracle of Ages
- The Legend of Zelda: Oracle of Seasons
- The Legend of Zelda: Tetra's Trackers
- The Legend of Zelda: The Wind Waker
- Leiji Matsumoto
- Lemon (anime)
- Léon Roches
- Lexus

== Lg ==
- LGBT rights in Japan (Gay rights)

== Lh ==
- LHA (file format)

== Li ==
- Liancourt Rocks
- Liberal Democratic Party (Japan)
- Liberal Party of Japan (1881)
- Liberal Party (Japan, 1945)
- Liberal Party (Japan, 1998)
- The Life of Oharu
- Gary Lineker
- Link (The Legend of Zelda)
- List of Japanese actors
- List of Japanese actresses
- List of airports in Japan
- List of battleships of Japan
- List of Buddhist temples in Japan
- List of cities and districts of Okinawa Prefecture
- List of cities in Hokkaidō
- List of cities in Japan
- List of Cultural Properties of Tōdai-ji
- List of Dragon Ball films
- List of Emperors of Japan
- List of English words of Japanese origin
- List of Final Fantasy characters
- List of Final Fantasy locations
- List of football clubs in Japan
- List of games by Konami
- List of hospitals in Japan
- List of islands of Japan
- List of Japanese birds
- List of Japanese birds: non-passerines
- List of Japanese birds: passerines
- List of Japanese board games
- List of Japanese cities by population
- List of Japanese companies
- List of Japanese cooking utensils
- List of Japanese film directors
- Lists of Japanese governors-general
- List of Japanese prefectures ranked by area
- List of Japanese prefectures by population
- List of museums in Japan
- List of prime ministers of Japan

== Li (cont'd) ==
- List of Japan-related topics
- List of Japanese rock bands
- List of Japanese people
- List of Japanese writers
- List of legendary creatures from Japan
- List of manga
- List of military aircraft of Japan
- List of national parks of Japan
- List of National Treasures of Japan (ancient documents)
- List of National Treasures of Japan (archaeological materials)
- List of National Treasures of Japan (crafts: others)
- List of National Treasures of Japan (crafts: swords)
- List of National Treasures of Japan (paintings)
- List of National Treasures of Japan (sculptures)
- List of National Treasures of Japan (temples)
- List of National Treasures of Japan (writings: Classical Chinese books)
- List of National Treasures of Japan (writings: Japanese books)
- List of National Treasures of Japan (writings: others)
- List of Olympus products
- List of political parties in Japan
- List of railway companies in Japan
- List of samurai
- List of schools in Japan
- List of ships of the Imperial Japanese Navy
- List of supernatural beings in Dragon Ball
- List of universities in Japan
- List of Westerners who visited Japan before 1868
- List of yokozuna
- Lists of National Treasures of Japan
- Little Boy
- Live under the sky

== Lj ==
- LJN

== Lo ==
- Local Autonomy Law
- Local train
- Loli-con
- Lolita fashion
- Lone Wolf and Cub
- The long love letter
- Loose socks
- Loppi (ticketing system)
- Lotus Sutra
- Loudness
- Love Hina
- Love Hina Again
- Love Hina main characters
- Love Hina media information
- Love Hina minor characters
- Love hotel
- Love Letter (1995 film)
- Love Letter (card game)

== Lu ==
- Lu Xun
- Lucky Records
- Luffy D. Monkey
- Luigi
- Luigi's Mansion
- Lugia
- Luís Fróis
- Luna (Sailor Moon)
- Lupin the 3rd

== Ly ==
- Lyndis
- Lynn Minmay
