= List of battleships of Japan =

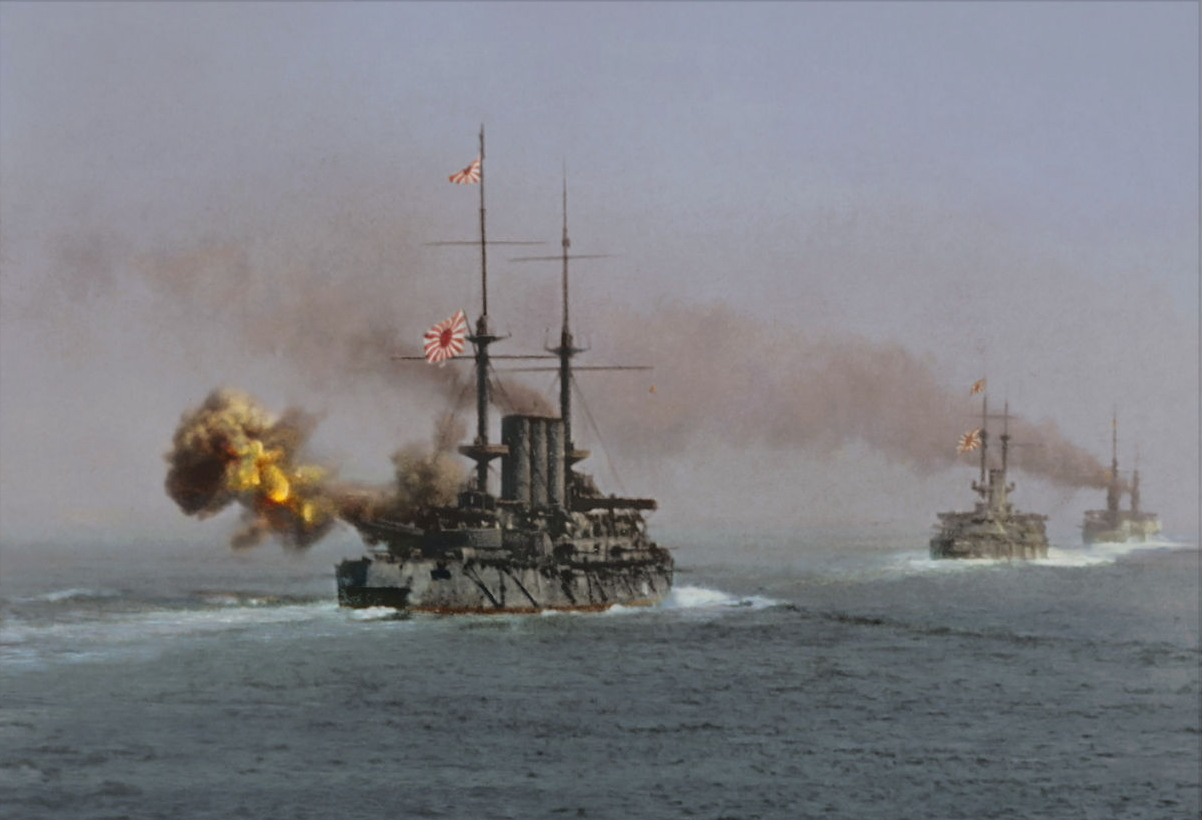
Shikishima firing during the Battle of the Yellow Sea

Between the 1890s and 1940s, the Imperial Japanese Navy (IJN) built a series of battleships as it expanded its fleet. Previously, the Empire of Japan had acquired a few ironclad warships from foreign builders, although it had adopted the Jeune École naval doctrine which emphasized cheap torpedo boats and commerce raiding to offset expensive, heavily armored ships. To counter the Beiyang Fleet of Imperial China in the early 1890s, however, Japan ordered two Fuji-class battleships from Great Britain as Japan lacked the technology and capability to construct its own vessels. Combat experience in the First Sino-Japanese War of 1894–1895 convinced the IJN that its doctrine was untenable, leading to a ten-year naval construction program that called for a total of six battleships and six armored cruisers (the Six-Six Fleet). The two ships of the Shikishima class and the battleships Asahi and Mikasa were also purchased from Great Britain. Aware that they could not outbuild the Americans or British, the IJN decided that their ships would always be qualitatively superior to offset their quantitative inferiority.

To counter reinforcement of the Russian Empire's Pacific Squadron as tensions rose between the Russians and the Japanese over control of Korea and Manchuria in the early 1900s, Japan ordered the two battleships of the Katori class in 1903, the last battleships ordered from abroad. To preempt further reinforcements before their own ships were completed, they began the Russo-Japanese War in 1904 with a surprise attack on the Russian base at Port Arthur. Shortly after the war began, the IJN ordered the two ships of the Satsuma class, the first battleships to be built in Japan. The Imperial Japanese Army captured Port Arthur, along with the surviving ships of the Pacific Squadron by the end of the year. The Russians had dispatched the bulk of their Baltic Fleet to relieve Port Arthur, which reached the Korea Strait in May 1905 and was virtually annihilated by the IJN in the Battle of Tsushima. During the war, Japan captured a total of five Russian pre-dreadnought battleships. They were repaired and commissioned into the Japanese fleet, and two were later sold back to Russia during World War I, as Japan and Russia were by then allies. The magnitude of the victory at Tsushima caused the leadership of the IJN to believe that a surface engagement between the main fleets was the only decisive battle in modern warfare and would be decided by battleships armed with the largest guns.

After the war, the Japanese Empire immediately turned its focus to the two remaining rivals for imperial dominance in the Pacific Ocean, Britain and the United States, believing that conflict would inevitably arise between Japan and at least one of its two main rivals. Accordingly, the 1907 Imperial Defense Policy called for the construction of a battle fleet of eight modern battleships and eight battlecruisers. This was the genesis of the Eight-Eight Fleet Program, the development of a cohesive battle line of sixteen capital ships. The launch of HMS Dreadnought in 1906 and the battlecruiser Invincible the following year by the Royal Navy raised the stakes and complicated Japan's plans as they rendered all existing battleships and armored cruisers obsolete, forcing Japan to restart the Eight-Eight plan with dreadnought battleships and battlecruisers. This began with the Kawachi class in 1907, followed by the Fusō and Ise classes in the 1910s. Japan ordered its seventh and eighth dreadnoughts with the Nagato class in 1916 and 1917.

In 1919, American president Woodrow Wilson announced the resumption of the 1916 naval construction program and the Japanese ordered eight fast battleships of the Kii and Number 13 classes in response. The prospect of a new massively expensive arms race between the United States, Britain and Japan after the war caused the three powers to agree to the Washington Naval Treaty which limited Japan to a ratio of 3:5:5 in battleship tonnage to the United States and Britain. The treaty forced the IJN to dispose of all of its pre-dreadnoughts and the oldest dreadnoughts; the ships then under construction had to be broken up or sunk as targets. Furthermore, the treaty mandated a building holiday that barred the construction of new battleships for ten years. During this period, opponents of the Washington Naval Treaty and its successors had taken control of the upper echelons of the IJN and rebuilt the Kongō-class battlecruisers into fast battleships and modernized the existing ships. Coupled with the growth of ultranationalism and dominance of the government by the military, the government decided to withdraw from the treaty regime when it expired in 1936. Planning by the Navy General Staff for the post-treaty era began in 1934 and included five large battleships armed with nine 460 mm (18.1 in) guns; these ships became the Yamato class. While the Yamatos were under construction in the late 1930s, the IJN began designing a successor class, the Design A-150 armed with 51 cm (20.1 in) guns, but never laid any down as they prepared for war and other ships had higher priority.

== Key ==
Key (Note: All figures are for the ship as completed.)
Armament	The number and type of the primary armament
Armor	The thickness of the belt armor
Displacement	Ship displacement at normal load
Propulsion	Number of shafts, type of propulsion system, and designed speed
Service	The dates work on the ship began and finished and its ultimate fate
Laid down	The date the keel began to be assembled
Commissioned/Captured	The date the ship was commissioned or captured

== Pre-dreadnoughts ==
=== Fuji class ===
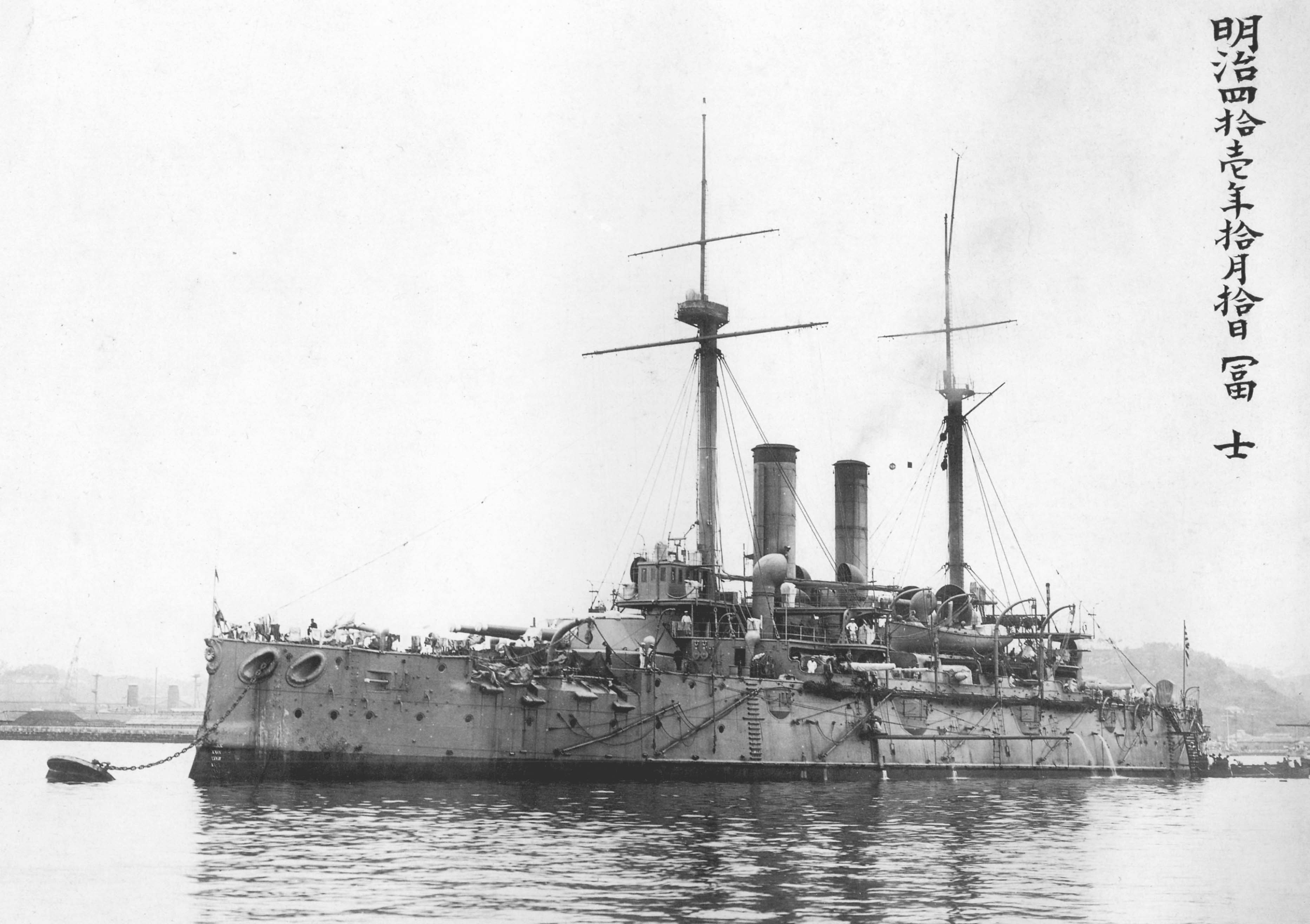
Fuji at anchor, October 1908

The two Fuji-class (富士型戦艦, Fuji-gata senkan) ships, Fuji and Yashima, were the IJN's first battleships, ordered from Britain in response to two new German-built Chinese ironclad warships. The ships were designed as smaller versions of the British Royal Sovereign class, although they were slightly faster and had a better type of armor.

As part of the 1st Fleet the Fujis participated in fighting off Port Arthur on 9–10 March 1904, wherein Fuji sustained light damage and Yashima was undamaged. On 15 May Yashima struck two naval mines and foundered. Fuji participated in the Battle of the Yellow Sea in August and was then slightly damaged during the Battle of Tsushima in May 1905. She was credited with the shot that caused the magazine explosion that destroyed the battleship Borodino. In October 1908, Fuji hosted the American ambassador to Japan and some senior officers of the Great White Fleet, and was later reclassified as a coast defense ship in 1910. The ship was disarmed and converted into an accommodation ship in 1922. Fuji was sunk by American aircraft in 1945 and scrapped in 1948.

Ship	Armament	Armor	Displacement	Propulsion	Service		
Ship	Armament	Armor	Displacement	Propulsion	Laid down	Commissioned	Fate
Fuji (富士)	2 × twin 12 in (305 mm)	18 in (457 mm)	12,230–12,533 long tons (12,426–12,734 t)	2 shafts, 2 triple-expansion steam engines, 18.25 knots (34 km/h; 21 mph)	1 August 1894	17 August 1897	Broken up, 1948
Yashima (八島)	2 × twin 12 in (305 mm)	18 in (457 mm)	12,230–12,533 long tons (12,426–12,734 t)	2 shafts, 2 triple-expansion steam engines, 18.25 knots (34 km/h; 21 mph)	6 December 1894	9 September 1897	Sank after striking a mine, 15 May 1904

=== Shikishima class ===
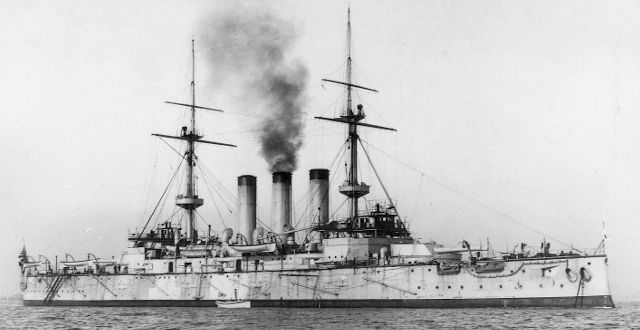
Japanese battleship Shikishima

The Shikishima class (敷島型戦艦, Shikishima-gata senkan) was designed as a more powerful version of the Royal Navy's Majestic-class battleship. The ships were also assigned to the 1st Fleet before the Russo–Japanese War, were present at the Battle of Port Arthur and were slightly damaged during the action. Hatsuse struck one of the mines that the Russians laid in May 1904 and sank following a magazine explosion. Shikishima fought in the Battle of the Yellow Sea, only being damaged by a misfiring 12-inch shell, and then participated in the Battle of Tsushima where she was hit nine times, suffered another misfire from one of her main guns, and, together with the battleship Mikasa, sank the Russian battleship Oslyabya. Shikishima spent the duration of World War I assigned to the Sasebo Naval District, and was demilitarized after the Washington Naval Treaty was signed in 1922. She was used as a training hulk at Sasebo until she was broken up in 1948.

Ship	Armament	Armor	Displacement	Propulsion	Service		
Ship	Armament	Armor	Displacement	Propulsion	Laid down	Commissioned	Fate
Shikishima (敷島)	2 × twin 12 in guns	9 in (229 mm)	14,850 long tons (15,090 t)	2 shafts, 2 triple-expansion steam engines, 18 knots (33 km/h; 21 mph)	29 March 1897	26 January 1900	Broken up, January 1948
Hatsuse (初瀬)	2 × twin 12 in guns	9 in (229 mm)	14,850 long tons (15,090 t)	2 shafts, 2 triple-expansion steam engines, 18 knots (33 km/h; 21 mph)	10 January 1898	18 January 1901	Sank 15 May 1904, after striking two mines

=== Asahi ===
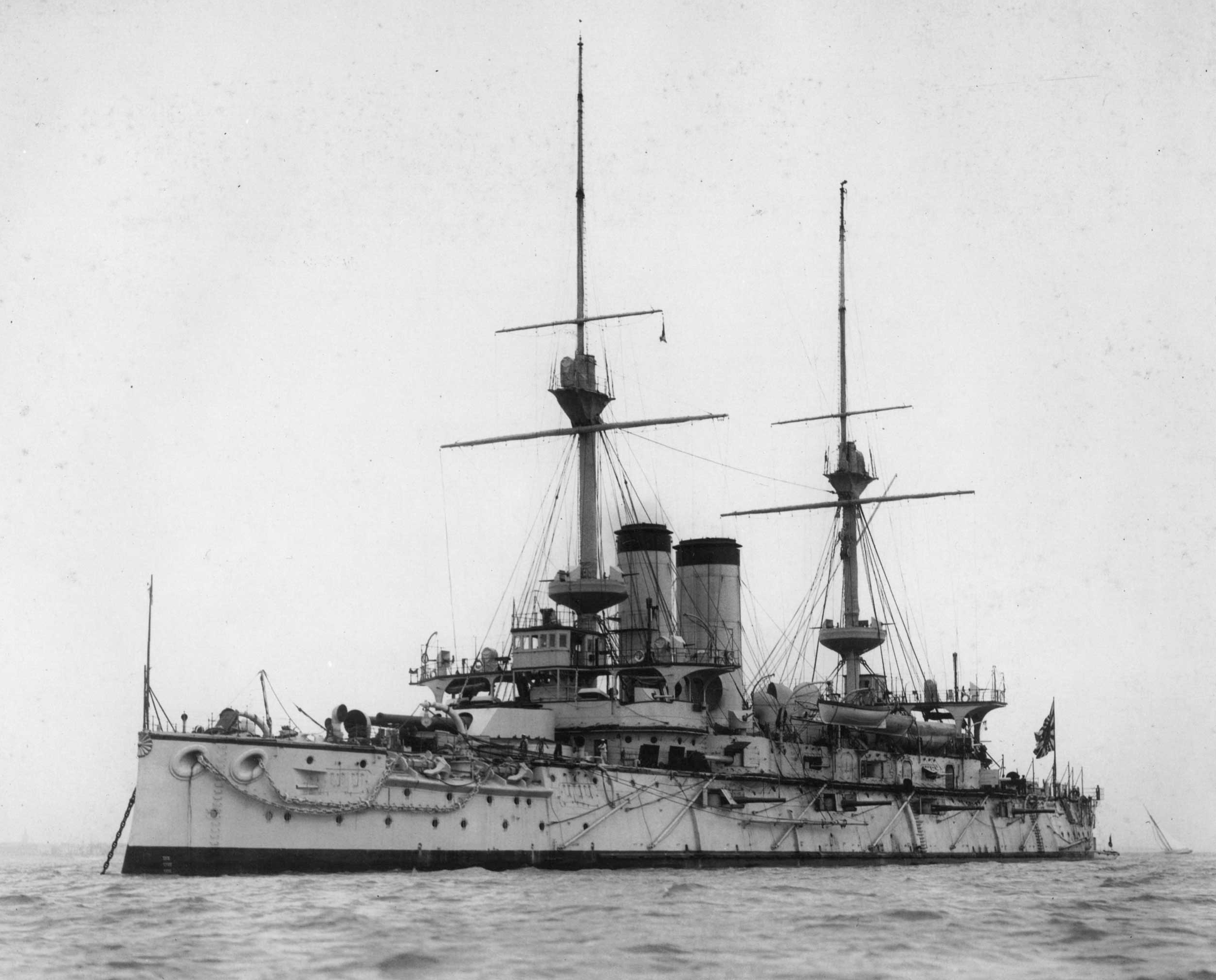
Asahi in July 1900

Asahi was a slightly improved version of the British Formidable-class battleships. She became the flagship of the IJN's Standing Fleet and was later assigned to the 1st Fleet when the Combined Fleet reformed in 1903. At the start of the Russo–Japanese War, Asahi took part in the Battle of Port Arthur and was not damaged by Russian fire. At the Battle of the Yellow Sea, the ship was moderately damaged, although she hit and damaged Poltava and Tsesarevich in return. Asahi struck a mine two months later near Port Arthur, but was repaired in time for the Battle of Tsushima. There, she helped disable the battleship Knyaz Suvorov and dueled with the battleships Borodino and Oryol, taking no damage.

She was a gunnery training ship for most of World War I until being rearmed in 1917 in time to escort troop transports during Japan's intervention in the Russian Civil War. Asahi was converted into a noncombat vessel during the 1920s and was then made a repair ship in 1937. On the night of 25–26 May 1942, Asahi was torpedoed and sunk by the submarine USS Salmon off modern-day Vietnam.

Ship	Armament	Armor	Displacement	Propulsion	Service		
Ship	Armament	Armor	Displacement	Propulsion	Laid down	Commissioned	Fate
Asahi (朝日)	2 × twin 12 in guns	9 in	15,200 long tons (15,400 t)	2 shafts, 2 triple-expansion steam engines, 18 knots	1 August 1897	31 July 1900	Sunk by USS Salmon, 25–26 May 1942

=== Mikasa ===
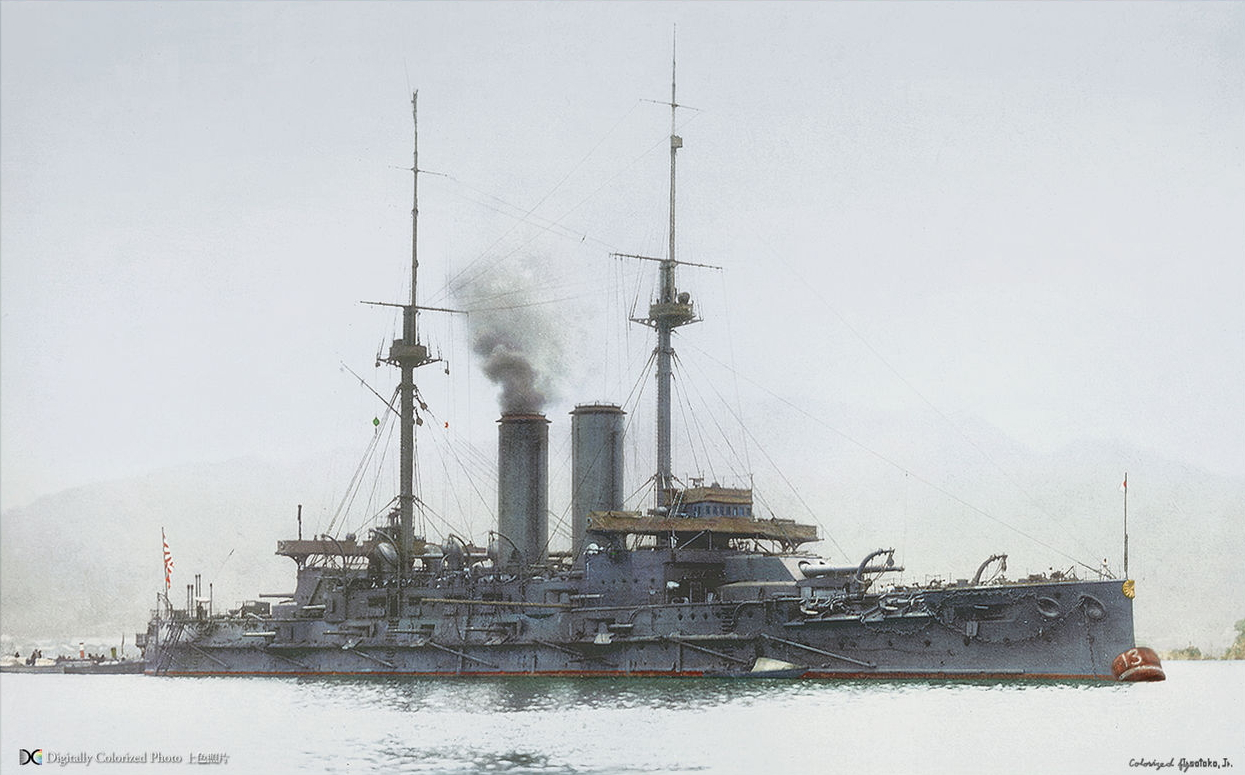
Mikasa in Kure, February 1905

Mikasa was also an improved version of the Formidable-class battleships and only differed in minor respects from Asahi. The ship served as the 1st Fleet flagship throughout the Russo-Japanese War. She participated in the Battle of Port Arthur on the second day of the war and the Battles of the Yellow Sea and Tsushima. During the latter battle, the ship was hit many times, but was only lightly damaged. Days after the end of the war, Mikasa's magazine accidentally exploded and sank the ship. She was salvaged and her repairs took over two years to complete. Afterward, the ship served as a coast-defense ship during World War I and supported Japanese forces when they intervened in the Russian Civil War. After the Washington Naval Treaty was ratified in 1922 Mikasa was preserved as a museum ship. She was badly neglected during the post–World War II occupation of Japan and required extensive refurbishing in the late 1950s, but has only partially been restored. Mikasa is the only surviving example of a pre-dreadnought battleship in the world.

Ship	Armament	Armor	Displacement	Propulsion	Service		
Ship	Armament	Armor	Displacement	Propulsion	Laid down	Commissioned	Fate
Mikasa (三笠)	2 × twin 12 in guns	9 in	15,140 long tons (15,380 t)	2 shafts, 2 triple-expansion steam engines, 18 knots	24 January 1899	1 March 1902	Preserved as a museum ship

=== Tango ===
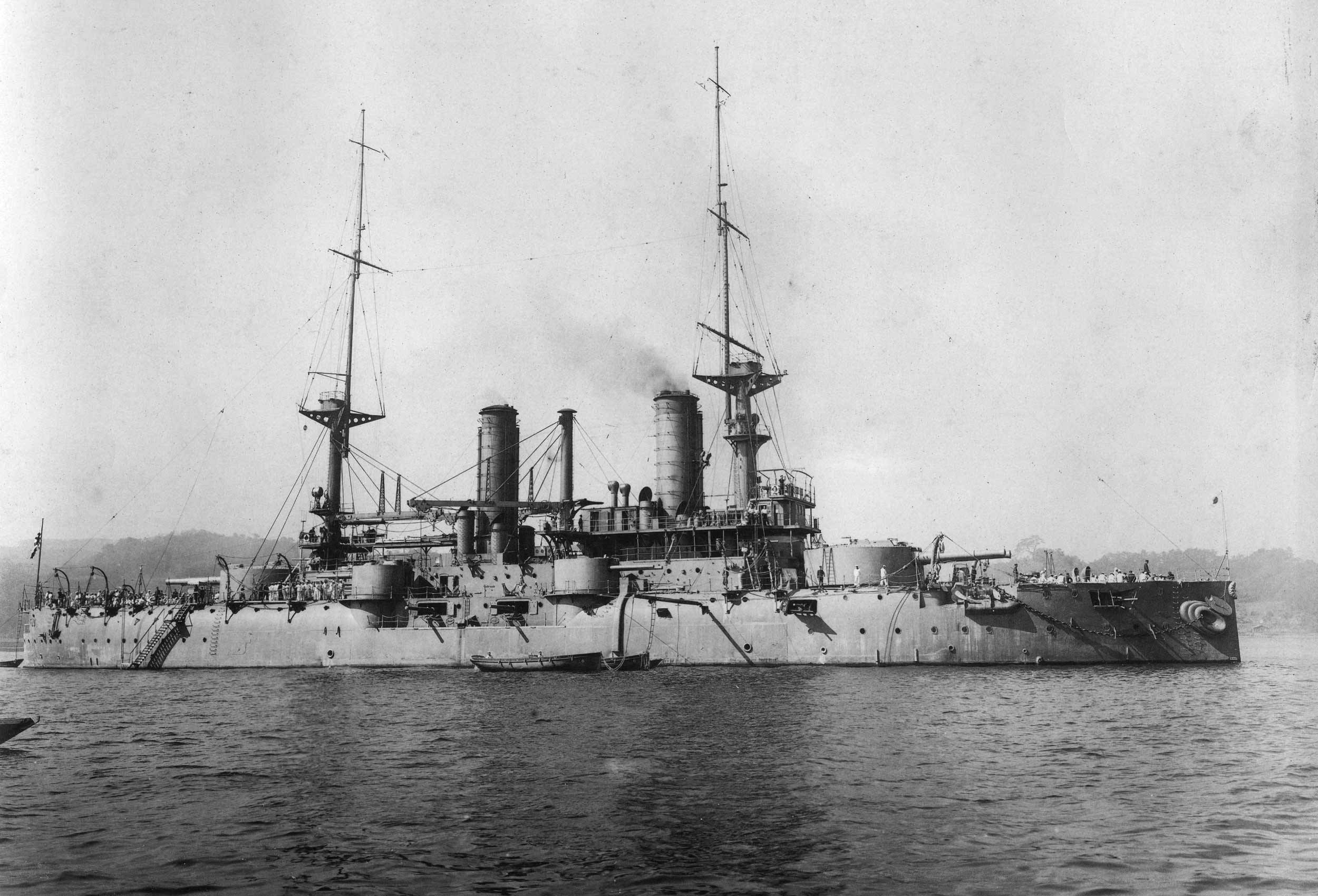
Tango at anchor, c. 1908–1909

Tango was laid down as the Russian battleship Poltava (Russian: Полтава), the second of three Petropavlovsk-class pre-dreadnought battleships. The ship was assigned to the Pacific Squadron shortly after her completion and based at Port Arthur from 1901. During the Russo-Japanese War, she participated in the Battle of Port Arthur and was heavily damaged during the Battle of the Yellow Sea. Sunk by Japanese artillery during the subsequent Siege of Port Arthur in December 1904, she was refloated by the IJN after the war and subsequently renamed Tango. During World War I, she bombarded German fortifications during the Siege of Tsingtao. The Japanese government sold Tango back to the Russians in 1916. She was renamed Chesma (Чесма) as her former name had been given to a new ship. Her crew declared for the Bolsheviks in October 1917, but saw no action in the Russian Civil War owing to her poor condition, and she was ultimately scrapped in 1924.

Ship	Armament	Armor	Displacement	Propulsion	Service		
Ship	Armament	Armor	Displacement	Propulsion	Laid down	Captured	Fate
Tango (丹後)	4 × 12 in guns	14.5 in (368 mm) Krupp armor	11,500 long tons (11,685 t)	2 shafts, 2 triple-expansion steam engines, 16 knots (30 km/h; 18 mph)	19 May 1892	2 January 1905	Returned to Russia, 1916, scrapped, 1924

=== Sagami and Suwo ===
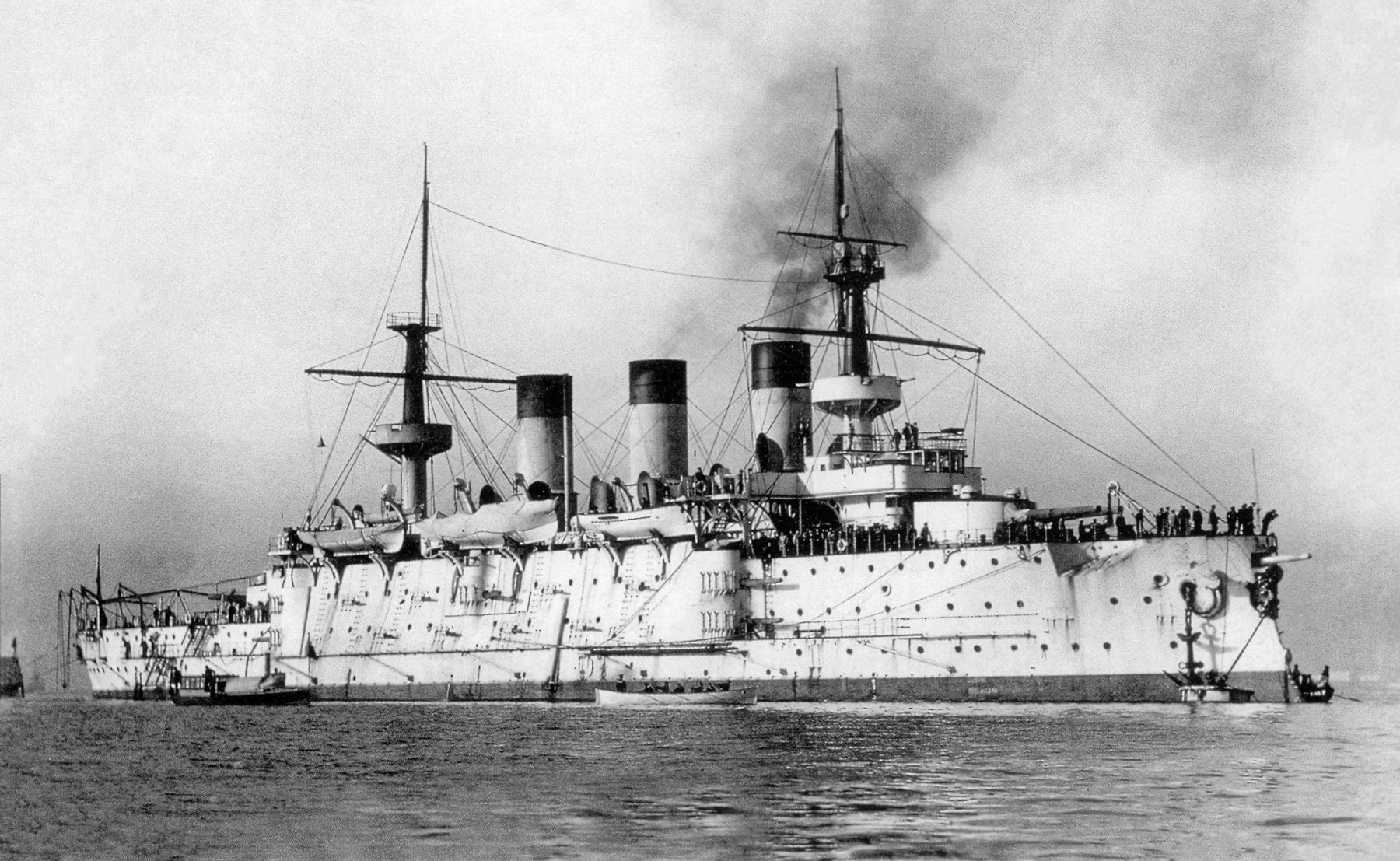
Sagami, still in Russian service as Peresvet in 1901

Sagami and Suwo were originally the Russian Peresvet-class battleships Peresvet (Пересвет) and Pobeda (Победа) respectively. The design of the Peresvet class was inspired by the British second-class battleships of the Centurion class. The British ships were intended to defeat commerce-raiding armored cruisers like the Russian ships Rossia and Rurik, and the Peresvet class was designed to support their armored cruisers.

The sisters were sunk during the Siege of Port Arthur and were salvaged by the IJN afterward. Because of their lighter armament than the other captured battleships, they were rated as coastal-defense ships. During World War I, Suwo was the flagship of the Japanese squadron during the Siege of Tsingtao and then of the 2nd Fleet before becoming a gunnery-training ship in 1916. Sagami was sold back to the Russians that same year and resumed her former name. While en route to northern Russia, the ship struck two mines in the Mediterranean and sank. Suwo was disarmed in 1922 in accordance with the terms of the Washington Naval Treaty and was probably scrapped afterward.

Ship	Armament	Armor	Displacement	Propulsion	Service		
Ship	Armament	Armor	Displacement	Propulsion	Laid down	Captured	Fate
Sagami (相模)	2 × twin 10 in (254 mm)	9 in	13,810 long tons (14,030 t)	2 shafts, 2 triple-expansion steam engines, 18 knots	21 November 1895	2 January 1905	Sunk by a mine off Port Said, Egypt, 4 January 1917
Suwo (周防)	2 × twin 10 in (254 mm)	9 in	13,320 long tons (13,530 t)	2 shafts, 2 triple-expansion steam engines, 18 knots	21 February 1899	2 January 1905	Probably scrapped, 1922–1923

=== Hizen ===
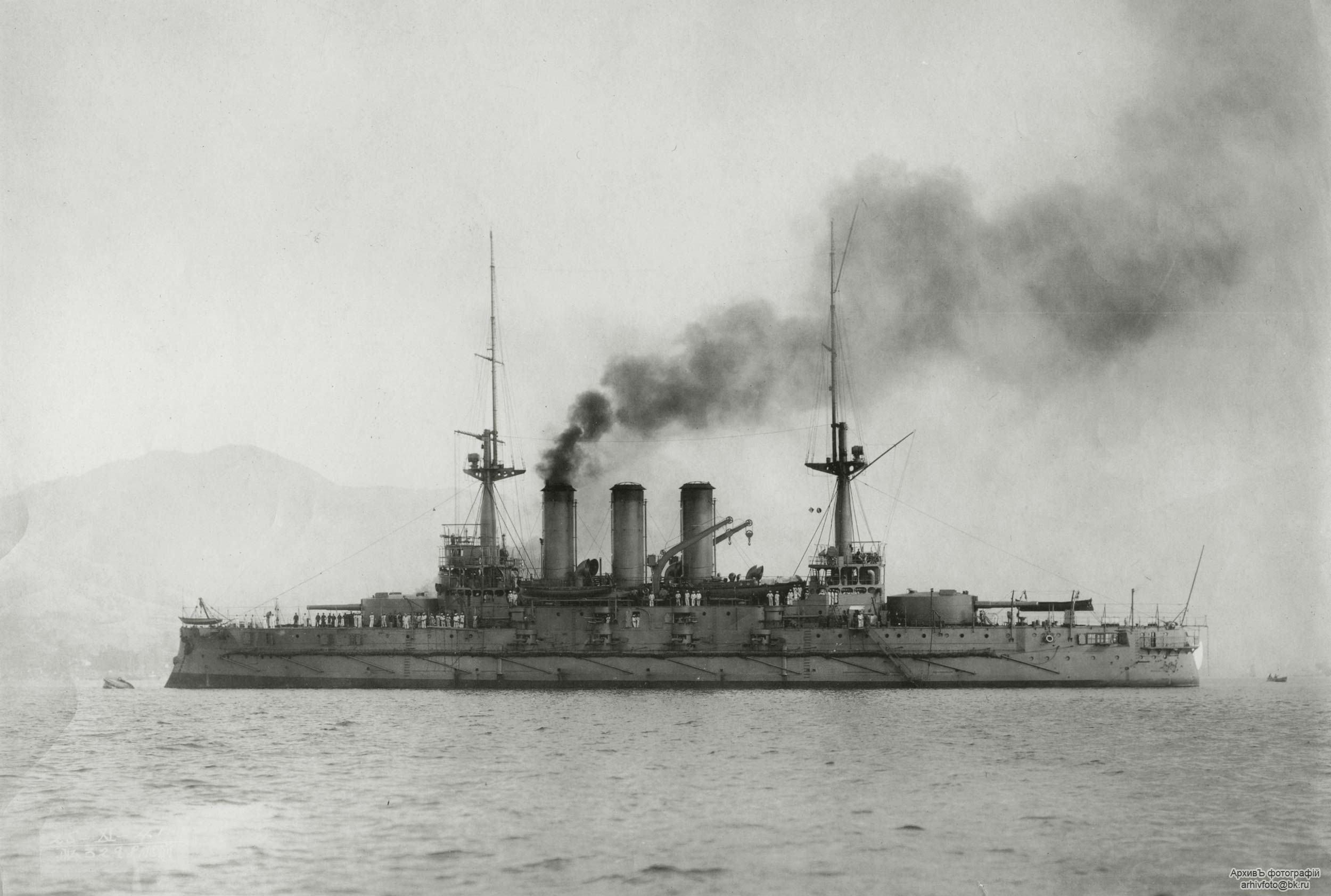
Hizen at anchor

Hizen, originally Retvizan (Ретвизан), was a Russian pre-dreadnought battleship built in America before the Russo-Japanese War because Russian shipyards were already at full capacity. The ship was torpedoed during the Battle of Port Arthur, but was repaired in time to participate in the Battle of the Yellow Sea, during which she was lightly damaged. She was sunk during the Siege of Port Arthur and salvaged by the IJN. During World War I, Hizen was sent to reinforce the weak British squadron off British Columbia, but diverted to Hawaii after reports of a German gunboat there were received. The ship was unsuccessfully sent to search for other German ships after the Americans interned the gunboat in November 1914. After the war she supported the Japanese intervention in the Russian Civil War and was disarmed in 1922 as required by the terms of the Washington Naval Treaty. Hizen was sunk as a target in 1924.

Ship	Armament	Armor	Displacement	Propulsion	Service		
Ship	Armament	Armor	Displacement	Propulsion	Laid down	Captured	Fate
Hizen (肥前)	2 × twin 12 in guns	9 in	12,780 long tons (12,985 t)	2 shafts, 2 triple-expansion steam engines, 18 knots	29 July 1899	2 January 1905	Sunk as a target ship, 25 July 1924

=== Iwami ===
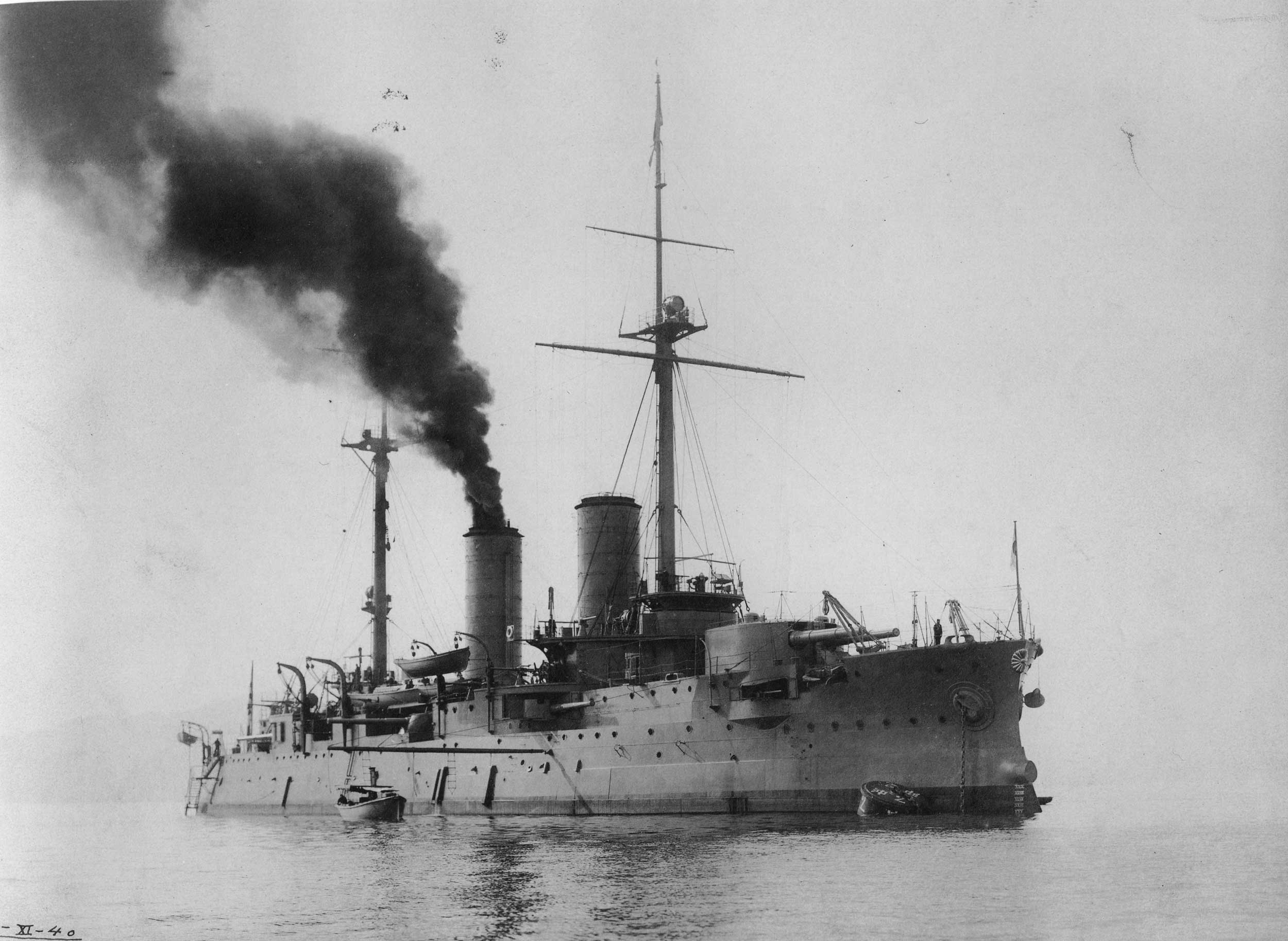
Iwami at anchor

Iwami was built shortly before the Russo-Japanese War for the Imperial Russian Navy as Oryol (Орёл), one of five Borodino-class battleships. Together with three of her sisters, she voyaged half-way around the world to participate in the Battle of Tsushima. Moderately damaged during the battle, the ship was surrendered to the IJN the following day. The Japanese rebuilt her from 1905 to 1907 and she was assigned to the 1st Fleet, although the ship was reclassified as a coast defense ship in 1912. Iwami participated in the Siege of Tsingtao in 1914 after Japan declared war on Imperial Germany and then became a guardship. She became the flagship of the 5th Division of the 3rd Fleet in 1918 and supported the Japanese intervention in the Russian Civil War. Iwami briefly became a training ship before she was disarmed in 1922 and was sunk as a target two years later.

Ship	Armament	Armor	Displacement	Propulsion	Service		
Ship	Armament	Armor	Displacement	Propulsion	Laid down	Captured	Fate
Iwami (石見)	2 × twin 12 in guns	7.64 in (194 mm)	14,151 long tons (14,378 t)	2 shafts, 2 triple-expansion steam engines, 18 knots	1 June 1900	28 May 1905	Sunk as a target ship, 10 July 1924

=== Katori class ===
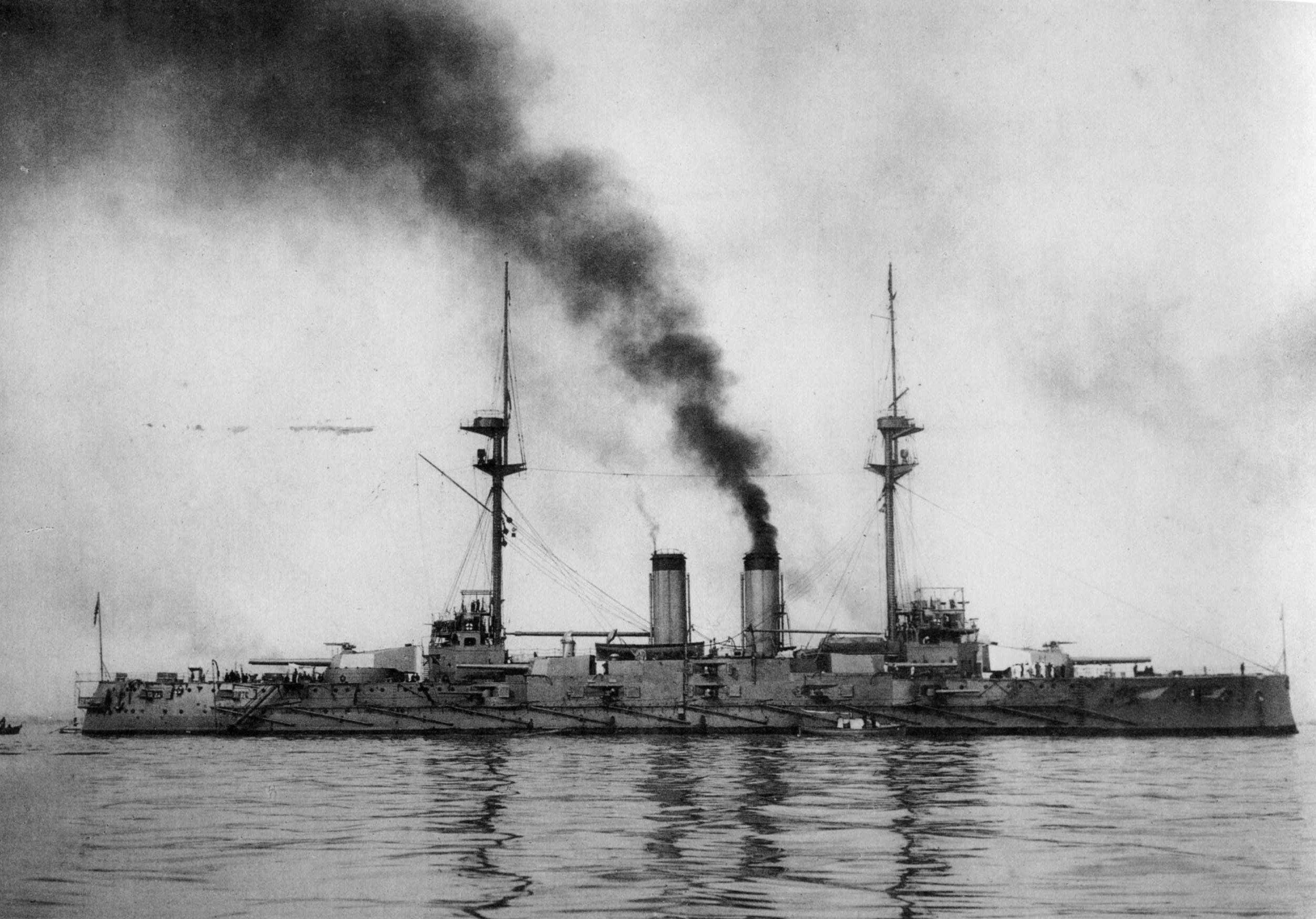
Katori at anchor

The pair of Katori-class pre-dreadnoughts were the last Japanese battleships to be built overseas. The design of the Katori class was a modified and improved version of the Royal Navy's King Edward VII-class battleships. Completed after the end of the Russo–Japanese War, the ships never saw combat. Katori had a major fire in one of her secondary-gun turrets in 1907 that killed 34 men and wounded 8 others. While they saw no action during World War I, they both participated in Japan's intervention in Siberia in 1918. In 1921, the sisters carried Crown Prince Hirohito on his tour of Europe where he met King George V. Under the terms of the Washington Naval Treaty, both ships were disarmed and scrapped between 1923 and 1925.

Ship	Armament	Armor	Displacement	Propulsion	Service		
Ship	Armament	Armor	Displacement	Propulsion	Laid down	Commissioned	Fate
Katori (香取)	2 × twin 12 in guns	9 in	15,950 long tons (16,210 t)	2 shafts, 2 triple-expansion steam engines, 18 knots	27 April 1904	20 May 1906	Sold for scrap, April 1924
Kashima (鹿島)	2 × twin 12 in guns	9 in	16,383 long tons (16,646 t)	2 shafts, 2 triple-expansion steam engines, 18 knots	29 February 1904	23 May 1906	Broken up, 1924–1925

=== Satsuma class ===
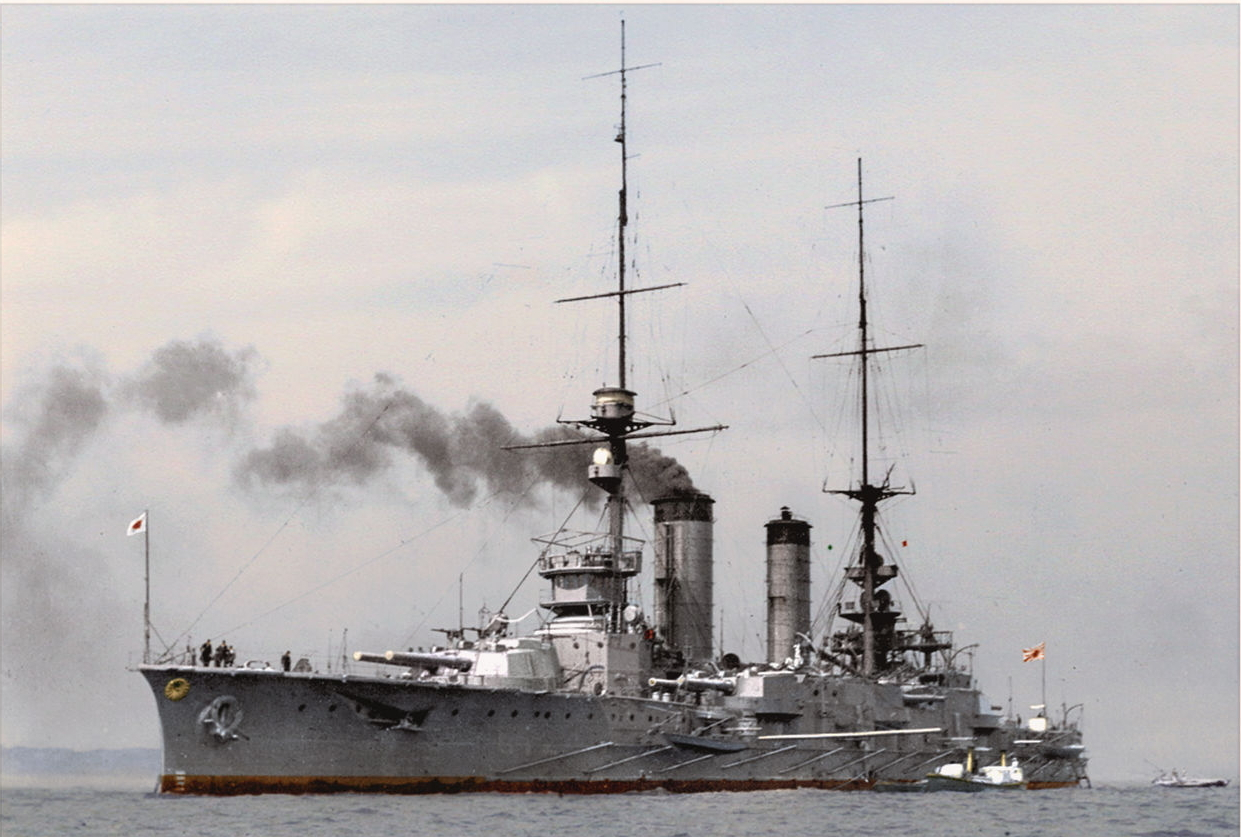
Satsuma at anchor

The Satsuma-class battleships, Satsuma and Aki, were the first battleships to be built in Japan. They marked a transitional stage in battleship design, as the sisters were intended to mount a dozen 12-inch (305 mm) guns. Material shortages in Japan and the expense of construction led to a redesign that armed the sisters with four 12-inch and a dozen 10-inch (254 mm) guns. If built as planned, the Satsuma class would have been the world's first "all big-gun" battleships. Satsuma was powered traditionally with two vertical triple-expansion engines, but Aki was the first Japanese battleship to use steam turbines.

The introduction of HMS Dreadnought in 1906 ensured that the Satsuma class was obsolete before the ships were even launched. Nevertheless, Aki was launched on 15 November, while Satsuma followed on 15 April 1907. Satsuma would go on to serve as Rear Admiral Tatsuo Matsumura's flagship in the Second South Seas Squadron as it seized the German possessions of the Caroline and the Palau Islands in October 1914 in the opening months of World War I. Satsuma would later be refitted at Sasebo Naval Arsenal in 1916 and served with the 1st Squadron for the rest of the war. Aki was also assigned to the 1st Squadron until she was transferred to the 2nd Battleship Squadron in 1918. Both ships were sunk as targets by Nagato and Mutsu in 1924.

Ship	Armament	Armor	Displacement	Propulsion	Service		
Ship	Armament	Armor	Displacement	Propulsion	Laid down	Commissioned	Fate
Satsuma (薩摩)	2 × twin 12 in guns 6 × twin 10 in	9 in (229 mm)	19,372 long tons (19,683 t)	2 shafts, 2 triple-expansion steam engines, 18.25 knots (33.8 km/h; 21.0 mph)	15 May 1905	25 March 1910	Sunk as a target ship, 7 September 1924
Aki (安芸)	2 × twin 12 in guns 6 × twin 10 in	9 in (229 mm)	20,100 long tons (20,400 t)	2 shafts, 2 steam turbine sets, 20 knots (37 km/h; 23 mph)	15 March 1906	11 March 1911	Sunk as a target ship, 2 September 1924

== Dreadnought battleships ==
=== Kawachi class ===
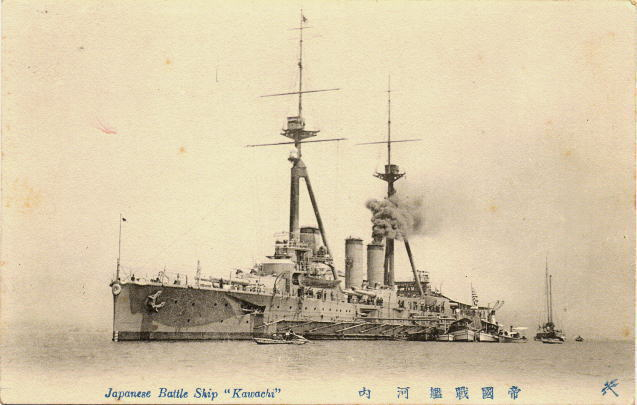
Postcard of Japanese battleship Kawachi

The Kawachi class (河内型戦艦, Kawachi-gata senkan), Kawachi and Settsu, were a pair of dreadnought battleships ordered in the Navy's Warship Supplement Program after the Russo-Japanese War. They were the IJN's first dreadnoughts and marked one of the first steps in achieving Japan's recently adopted Eight-Eight Fleet Program. The sisters were armed with four 50-caliber 12-inch and eight 45-caliber 12-inch main guns, arranged in the hexagonal layout used by the German dreadnoughts of the Nassau and Helgoland classes. They had originally been designed with a dozen 45-caliber guns, but after the IJN received word that the Royal Navy had adopted the more powerful and expensive 50-caliber guns, it upgraded the four centerline guns to the longer caliber as it could not afford to upgrade all of them.

Settsu and Kawachi bombarded German fortifications at Tsingtao during the Battle of Tsingtao in 1914, but saw no other combat in World War I. Kawachi sank in 1918 after an explosion in her ammunition magazine with the loss of over 600 officers and crewmen. Settsu was disarmed in 1922 and converted into a target ship. She was heavily damaged in 1945 by American carrier aircraft and eventually beached to avoid sinking. The ship was subsequently scrapped in 1946–1947.

Ship	Armament	Armor	Displacement	Propulsion	Service		
Ship	Armament	Armor	Displacement	Propulsion	Laid down	Commissioned	Fate
Kawachi (河内)	6 × twin 12 in guns	12 in	20,823 long tons (21,157 t)	2 shafts, 2 steam turbines, 21 knots (39 km/h; 24 mph)	1 April 1909	31 March 1912	Sunk by magazine explosion, 12 July 1918
Settsu (摂津)	6 × twin 12 in guns	12 in	21,443 long tons (21,787 t)	2 shafts, 2 steam turbines, 21 knots (39 km/h; 24 mph)	18 January 1909	30 March 1911	Scrapped, 1946–1947

=== Fusō class ===
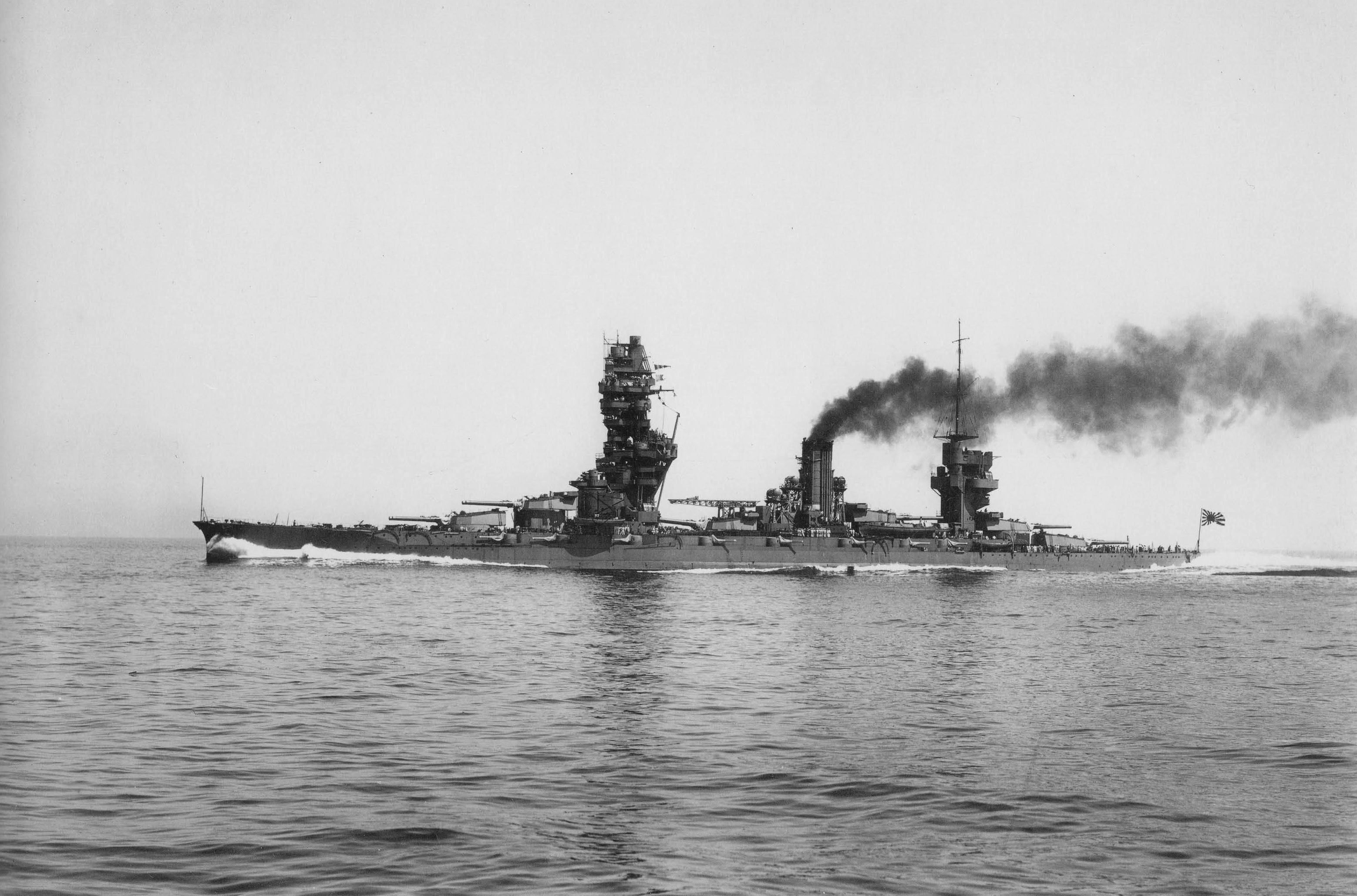
Fusō on trials in 1933 after her modernization

The Fusō-class battleships (扶桑型戦艦, Fusō-gata senkan), Fusō and Yamashiro, were a pair of dreadnoughts built for the IJN during World War I. Both patrolled briefly off the coast of China before being placed in reserve at the war's end. Although they were extensively modernized during the 1930s, the sisters were considered obsolescent by the eve of World War II, and neither saw significant action in its early years. Fusō and Yamashiro briefly served as troop transports in 1943, but mostly served as training ships that year. They were the only two Japanese battleships at the Battle of Surigao Strait in October 1944, the southernmost action of the Battle of Leyte Gulf, and were sunk by torpedoes and naval gunfire during the night battle with the loss of almost all of their crews.

Ship	Armament	Armor	Displacement	Propulsion	Service		
Ship	Armament	Armor	Displacement	Propulsion	Laid down	Commissioned	Fate
Fusō (扶桑)	6 × twin 14 in (356 mm) guns	12 in	28,863 long tons (29,326 t)	4 shafts, 4 steam turbines, 22.5 knots (41.7 km/h; 25.9 mph)	11 March 1912	8 November 1915	Sunk during the Battle of Surigao Strait, 25 October 1944
Yamashiro (山城)	6 × twin 14 in (356 mm) guns	12 in	28,863 long tons (29,326 t)	4 shafts, 4 steam turbines, 22.5 knots (41.7 km/h; 25.9 mph)	20 November 1913	31 March 1917	Sunk during the Battle of Surigao Strait, 25 October 1944

=== Ise class ===
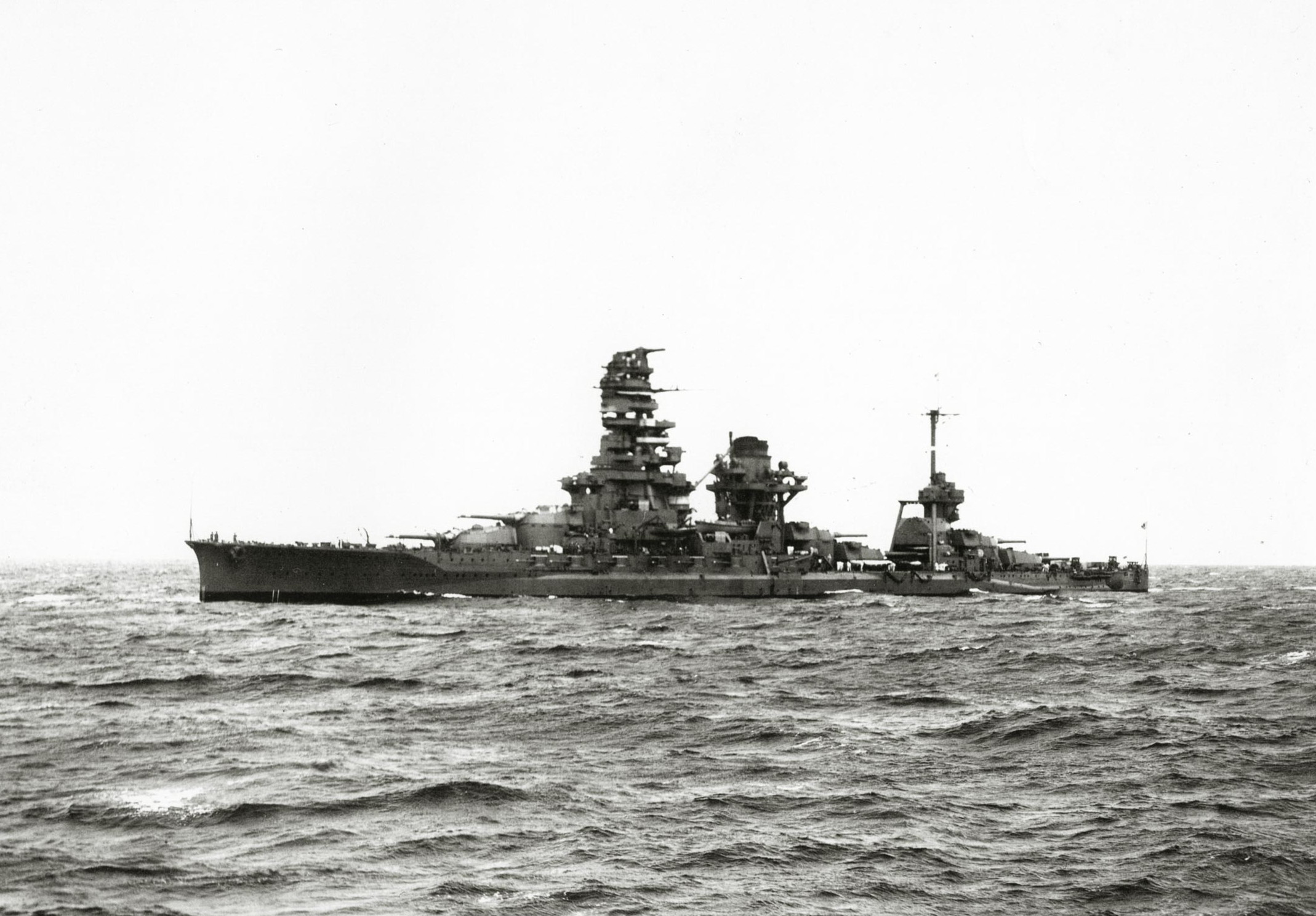
Ise underway after her modernization

The Ise-class battleships (伊勢型戦艦, Ise-gata senkan) were another pair of dreadnoughts built during World War I. Both ships carried supplies for the survivors of the Great Kantō earthquake in 1923. They were modernized in the interwar period with improvements to their armor and machinery and a rebuilt superstructure in the pagoda mast style. Afterward they played a minor role in the Second Sino-Japanese War.

Despite the expensive reconstructions, both vessels were considered obsolete by the eve of the Pacific War, and neither saw significant action in the early years of the war. Following the loss of most of the IJN's large aircraft carriers during the Battle of Midway in mid-1942, they were rebuilt with a flight deck replacing the rear pair of gun turrets to give them the ability to operate an air group of floatplanes. A lack of aircraft and qualified pilots, however, meant that they never actually operated their aircraft in combat. While awaiting their air group, the sister ships were occasionally used to ferry troops and material to Japanese bases. They participated in the Battle off Cape Engaño in late 1944, where they decoyed the American carrier fleet supporting the invasion of Leyte away from the landing beaches. Afterward, both ships were transferred to Southeast Asia; in early 1945 they participated in Operation Kita, where they transported petrol and other strategic materials to Japan. The sisters were then reduced to reserve until they were sunk during American airstrikes in July. After the war, they were scrapped in 1946–1947.

Ship	Armament	Armor	Displacement	Propulsion	Service		
Ship	Armament	Armor	Displacement	Propulsion	Laid down	Commissioned	Fate
Ise (伊勢)	6 × twin 14 in guns	11.8 in (299 mm)	31,260 long tons (31,760 t)	4 shafts, 4 steam turbines, 23 knots (43 km/h; 26 mph)	10 May 1915	15 December 1917	Sunk, 28 July 1945
Hyūga (日向)	6 × twin 14 in guns	11.8 in (299 mm)	31,260 long tons (31,760 t)	4 shafts, 4 steam turbines, 23 knots (43 km/h; 26 mph)	6 May 1915	30 April 1918	Sunk, 24 July 1945

=== Nagato class ===
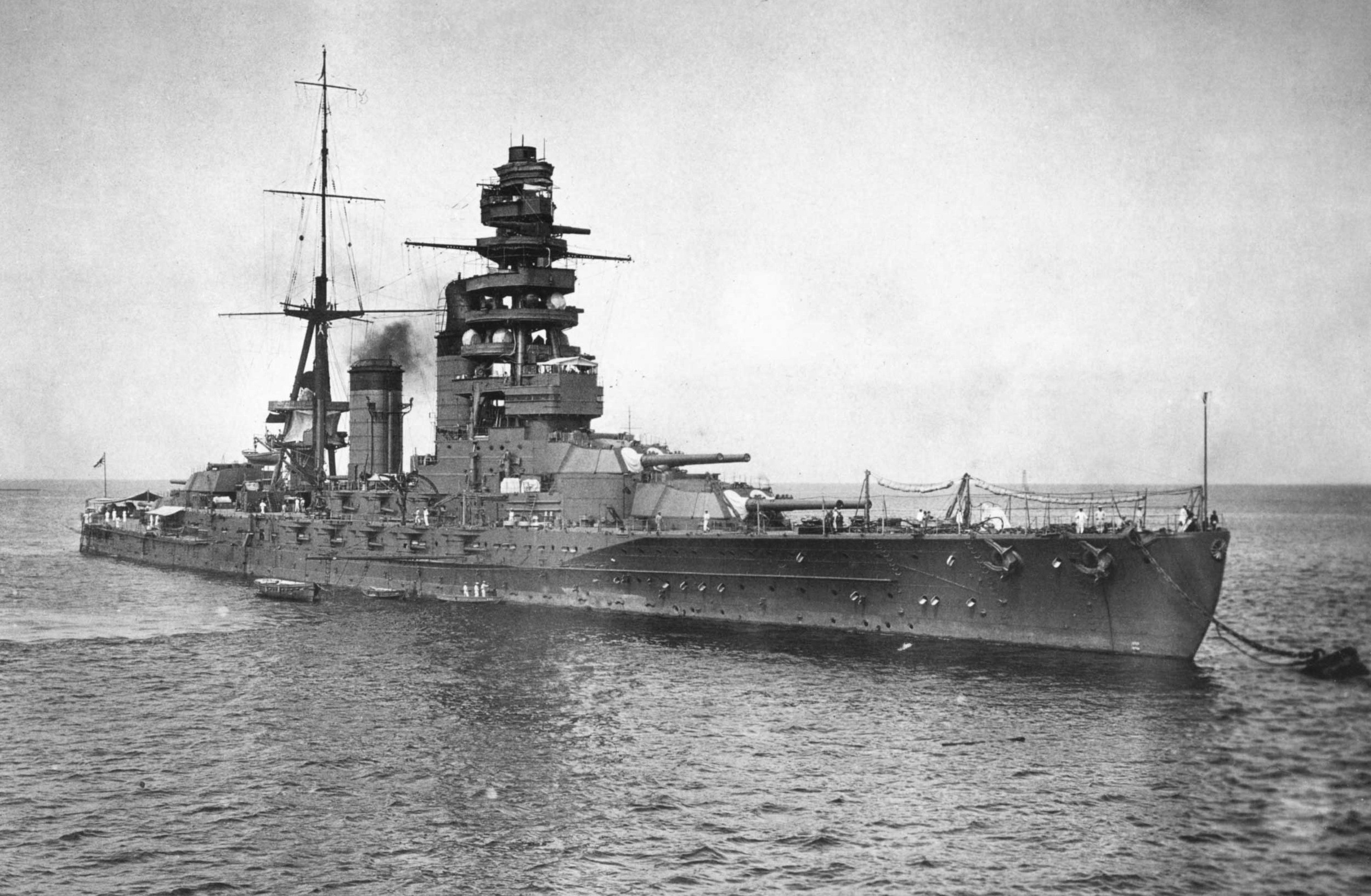
Nagato at anchor, c. 1924

The Nagato-class battleships (長門型戦艦, Nagato-gata senkan) were the third pair of dreadnoughts built during World War I, although they were not completed until after the end of the war. Both ships carried supplies for the survivors of the Great Kantō earthquake in 1923. Modernized during the 1930s, Nagato and her sister ship Mutsu briefly participated in the Second Sino-Japanese War in 1937 and Nagato was the flagship of Admiral Isoroku Yamamoto during the attack on Pearl Harbor on 7 December 1941 that began the Pacific War.

The sisters participated in the Battle of Midway in June 1942, although they did not see any combat. Mutsu participated in the Battle of the Eastern Solomons in August before returning to Japan in early 1943. One of her magazines exploded in June, destroying the ship. Nagato spent most of the first two years of the war training in home waters. She was transferred to Truk in mid-1943, but did not see any combat until the Battle of the Philippine Sea in mid-1944 when she was attacked by American aircraft. Nagato did not fire her main armament against enemy vessels until the Battle of Leyte Gulf in October 1944. She was lightly damaged during the battle and returned to Japan the following month for repairs. The IJN was running out of fuel by this time and decided not to fully repair her. Nagato was converted into a floating anti-aircraft platform and assigned to coastal defense duties. After the war, the ship was a target for US nuclear weapon tests during Operation Crossroads in mid-1946. She survived the first test with little damage, but was sunk by the second test.

Ship	Armament	Armor	Displacement	Propulsion	Service		
Ship	Armament	Armor	Displacement	Propulsion	Laid down	Commissioned	Fate
Nagato (長門)	4 × twin 41 cm (16.1 in) guns	12 in Vickers cemented armor	32,200 long tons (32,720 t)	4 shafts, 4 steam turbines, 26.5 knots (49.1 km/h; 30.5 mph)	28 August 1917	25 November 1920	Sunk during Operation Crossroads, 29/30 July 1946
Mutsu (陸奥)	4 × twin 41 cm (16.1 in) guns	12 in Vickers cemented armor	32,200 long tons (32,720 t)	4 shafts, 4 steam turbines, 26.5 knots (49.1 km/h; 30.5 mph)	1 June 1918	24 October 1921	Sunk by internal explosion, 8 June 1943

=== Tosa class ===
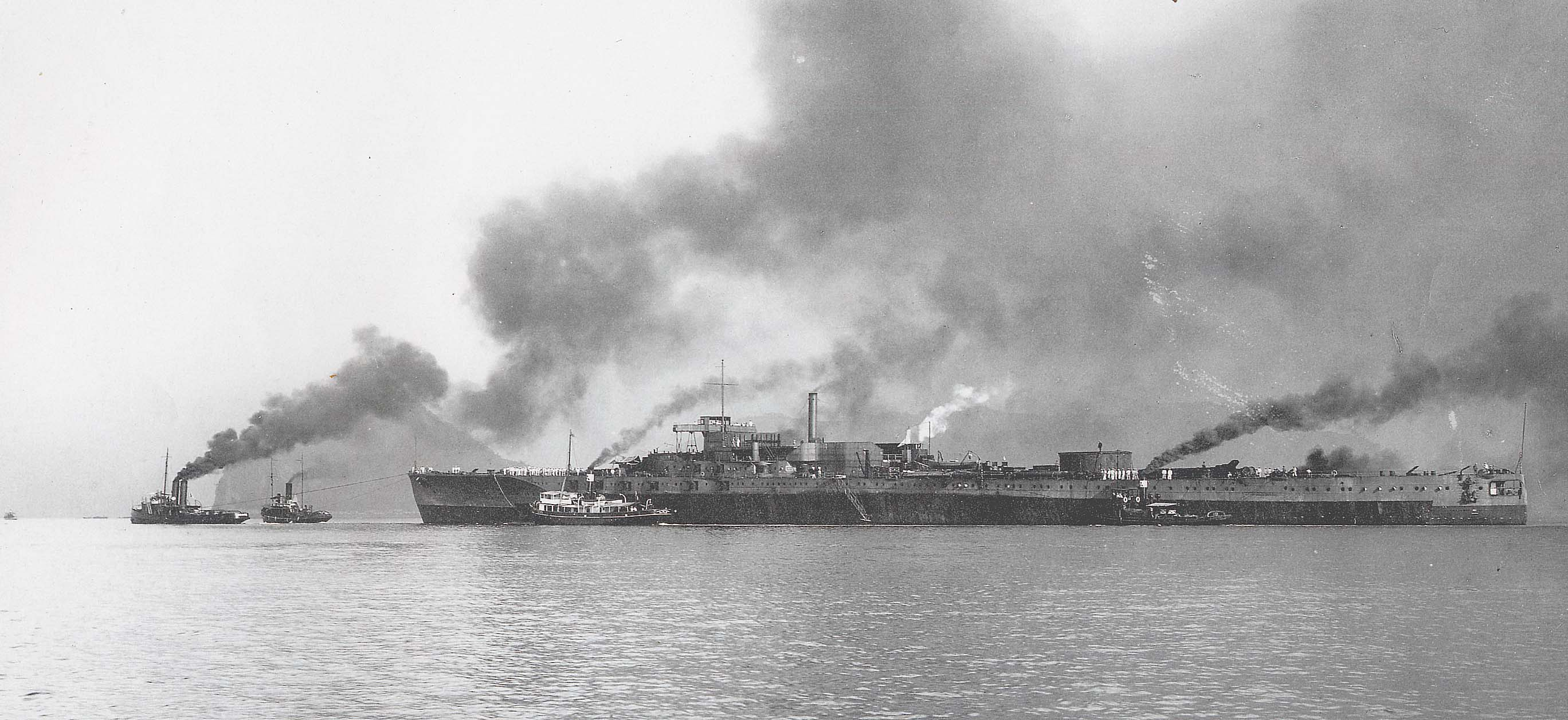
Tosa being towed to Nagasaki, 1 September 1922

The Tosa-class battleships (土佐型戦艦, Tosa-gata senkan) were ordered during the early 1920s. They were larger versions of the preceding Nagato class, and carried an additional twin-gun 41 cm turret. Both ships were launched in late 1921, but the first ship, Tosa, was cancelled in accordance with the terms of the Washington Naval Treaty before she could be completed, and was used in experiments testing the effectiveness of its armor scheme before being scuttled. The hull of the second ship, Kaga, was converted into an aircraft carrier to replace an Amagi-class battlecruiser that had been wrecked by the Great Kanto earthquake of 1923. The carrier supported Japanese troops in China during the Second Sino-Japanese War and took part in the attack on Pearl Harbor and the invasion of Rabaul in the Southwest Pacific in January 1942. The following month her aircraft participated in a combined carrier airstrike on Darwin, Australia, during the Dutch East Indies campaign. She was sunk during the Battle of Midway in 1942.

Ship	Armament	Armor	Displacement	Propulsion	Service		
Ship	Armament	Armor	Displacement	Propulsion	Laid down	Commissioned	Fate
Tosa (土佐)	5 × twin 41 cm guns	11 in (280 mm)	39,300 long tons (39,900 t)	4 shafts, 4 steam turbines, 26.5 knots (49.1 km/h; 30.5 mph)	16 February 1920	—N/a	Scuttled, 9 February 1925
Kaga (加賀)	5 × twin 41 cm guns	11 in (280 mm)	39,300 long tons (39,900 t)	4 shafts, 4 steam turbines, 26.5 knots (49.1 km/h; 30.5 mph)	19 July 1920	31 March 1928	Converted into an aircraft carrier, sunk during the Battle of Midway, 4 June 1942

=== Kii class ===
The Kii-class battleship was a planned class of four fast battleships to be built during the 1920s. Only two of the ships received names. They were intended to reinforce Japan's "Eight-Eight fleet" of eight battleships and eight battlecruisers after the United States announced the reinitiation of a major naval construction program in 1919. However, after the signing of the Washington Naval Treaty in 1922, work on the ships was suspended; one pair was cancelled in November 1923 and the other in April 1924.

Ship	Armament	Armor	Displacement	Propulsion	Service		
Ship	Armament	Armor	Displacement	Propulsion	Laid down	Commissioned	Fate
Kii (紀伊)	5 × twin 41 cm guns	292 mm (11.5 in)	41,900 long tons (42,600 t)	4 shafts, 4 steam turbines, 29.75 knots (55.1 km/h; 34.2 mph)	—N/a	—N/a	—N/a
Owari (尾張)	5 × twin 41 cm guns	292 mm (11.5 in)	41,900 long tons (42,600 t)	4 shafts, 4 steam turbines, 29.75 knots (55.1 km/h; 34.2 mph)	—N/a	—N/a	—N/a
No. 11	5 × twin 41 cm guns	292 mm (11.5 in)	41,900 long tons (42,600 t)	4 shafts, 4 steam turbines, 29.75 knots (55.1 km/h; 34.2 mph)	—N/a	—N/a	—N/a
No. 12	5 × twin 41 cm guns	292 mm (11.5 in)	41,900 long tons (42,600 t)	4 shafts, 4 steam turbines, 29.75 knots (55.1 km/h; 34.2 mph)	—N/a	—N/a	—N/a

=== Number 13 class ===
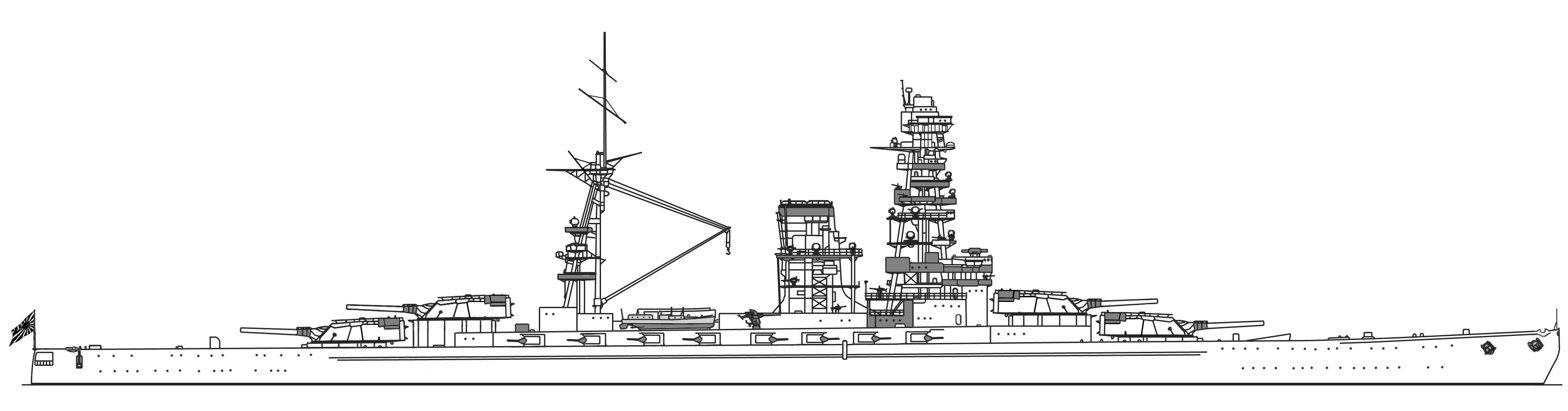
Line-drawing of the No. 13 design

The Number 13–class battleship was a planned class of four fast battleships to be built after the Kii class during the 1920s. The ships never received any names, being known only as Numbers 13–16. They were intended to reinforce Japan's "Eight-Eight Fleet" of eight battleships and eight battlecruisers after the United States announced the reinitiation of a major naval construction program in 1919. The Number 13 class was designed to be superior to all other existing battleships, planned or building. After the signing of the Washington Naval Treaty in 1922, they were cancelled in November 1923 before construction could begin.

Ship	Armament	Armor	Displacement	Propulsion	Service		
Ship	Armament	Armor	Displacement	Propulsion	Laid down	Commissioned	Fate
No. 13	4 × twin 45.7 cm (18 in) guns	330 mm (13 in)	46,700 long tons (47,500 t)	4 shafts, 4 steam turbines, 30 knots (56 km/h; 35 mph)	—N/a	—N/a	—N/a
No. 14	4 × twin 45.7 cm (18 in) guns	330 mm (13 in)	46,700 long tons (47,500 t)	4 shafts, 4 steam turbines, 30 knots (56 km/h; 35 mph)	—N/a	—N/a	—N/a
No. 15	4 × twin 45.7 cm (18 in) guns	330 mm (13 in)	46,700 long tons (47,500 t)	4 shafts, 4 steam turbines, 30 knots (56 km/h; 35 mph)	—N/a	—N/a	—N/a
No. 16	4 × twin 45.7 cm (18 in) guns	330 mm (13 in)	46,700 long tons (47,500 t)	4 shafts, 4 steam turbines, 30 knots (56 km/h; 35 mph)	—N/a	—N/a	—N/a

=== Kongō-class battlecruiser ===
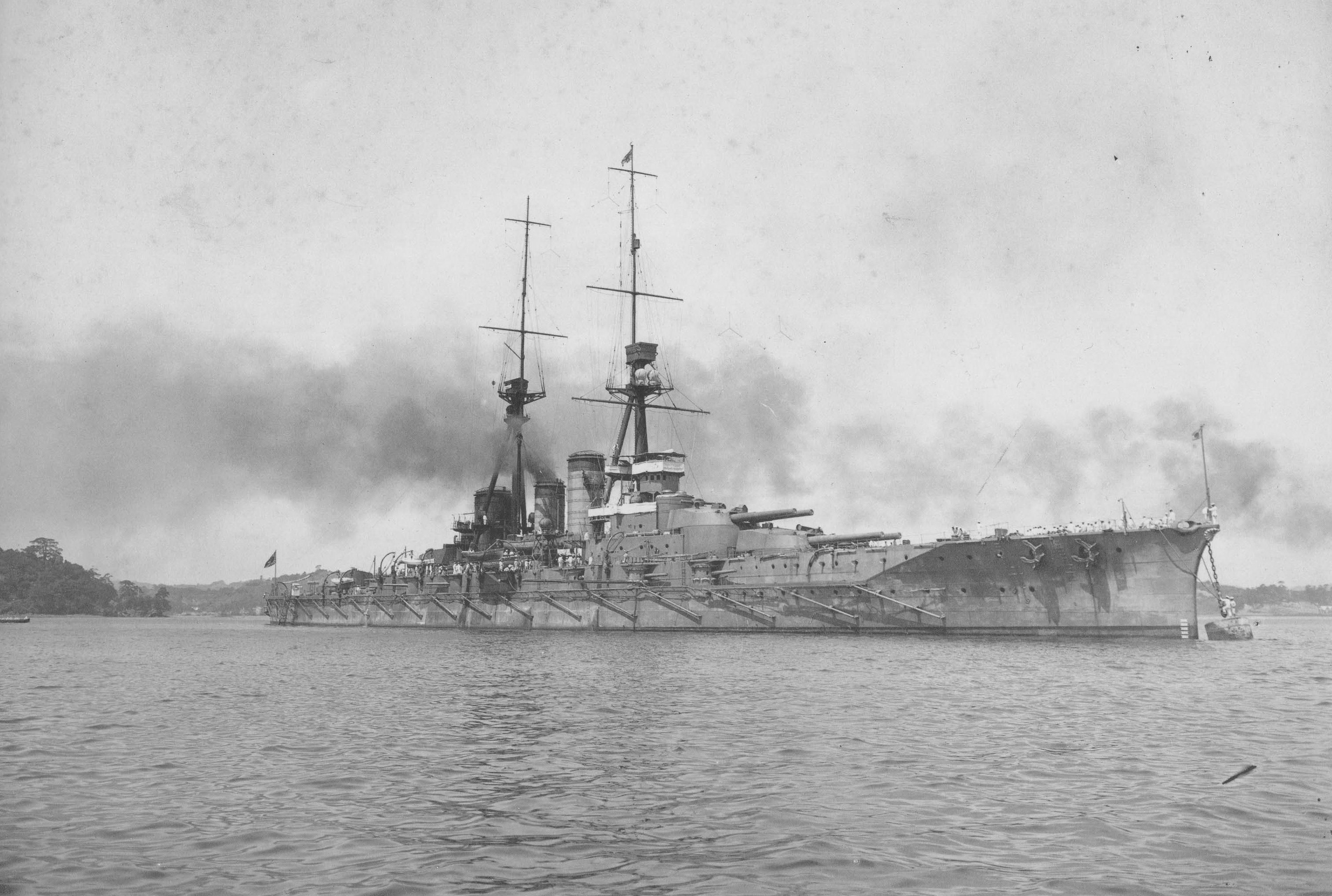
IJN battlecruiser Haruna, Yokosuka, Japan, 1916

The Kongō-class battlecruisers were rebuilt as fast battleships during the 1920s and '30s. Their turbines and boilers were replaced by lighter, more powerful models, they were bulged to improve their underwater protection, their horizontal armor was increased and the range of their guns was increased.

The Kongōs were the most active capital ships of the IJN during the Pacific War, participating in most of the major engagements. Hiei and Kirishima acted as escorts during the attack on Pearl Harbor, while Kongō and Haruna supported the Dutch East Indies Campaign. All four participated in the Battles of Midway and Guadalcanal. Hiei and Kirishima were both sunk during the Naval Battle of Guadalcanal in November 1942, while Haruna and Kongō jointly bombarded Henderson Field on Guadalcanal. The two remaining sisters spent most of 1943 shuttling between Japanese naval bases before participating in the major naval campaigns of 1944. They helped to sink two American destroyers and an escort carrier during the Battle of Leyte Gulf. Kongō was torpedoed and sunk by the submarine USS Sealion in November, while Haruna was sunk at her moorings by an air attack on Kure Naval Base in late July 1945; she was raised and scrapped in 1946.

Ship	Armament	Armor	Displacement	Propulsion	Service		
Ship	Armament	Armor	Displacement	Propulsion	Laid down	Commissioned	Fate
Kongō (金剛)	4 × twin 14 in guns	8 in (203 mm)	31,648 long tons (32,156 t)	4 shafts, 4 steam turbines, 30.5 knots (56.5 km/h; 35.1 mph)	17 January 1911	16 August 1913	Sunk, 21 November 1944
Hiei (比叡)	4 × twin 14 in guns	8 in (203 mm)	31,648 long tons (32,156 t)	4 shafts, 4 steam turbines, 30.5 knots (56.5 km/h; 35.1 mph)	4 November 1911	4 August 1914	Sunk, 13 November 1942
Haruna (榛名)	4 × twin 14 in guns	8 in (203 mm)	31,648 long tons (32,156 t)	4 shafts, 4 steam turbines, 30.5 knots (56.5 km/h; 35.1 mph)	16 March 1912	19 April 1915	Sunk, 28 July 1945
Kirishima (霧島)	4 × twin 14 in guns	8 in (203 mm)	31,648 long tons (32,156 t)	4 shafts, 4 steam turbines, 30.5 knots (56.5 km/h; 35.1 mph)	17 March 1912	19 April 1915	Sunk, 15 November 1942

=== Yamato class ===
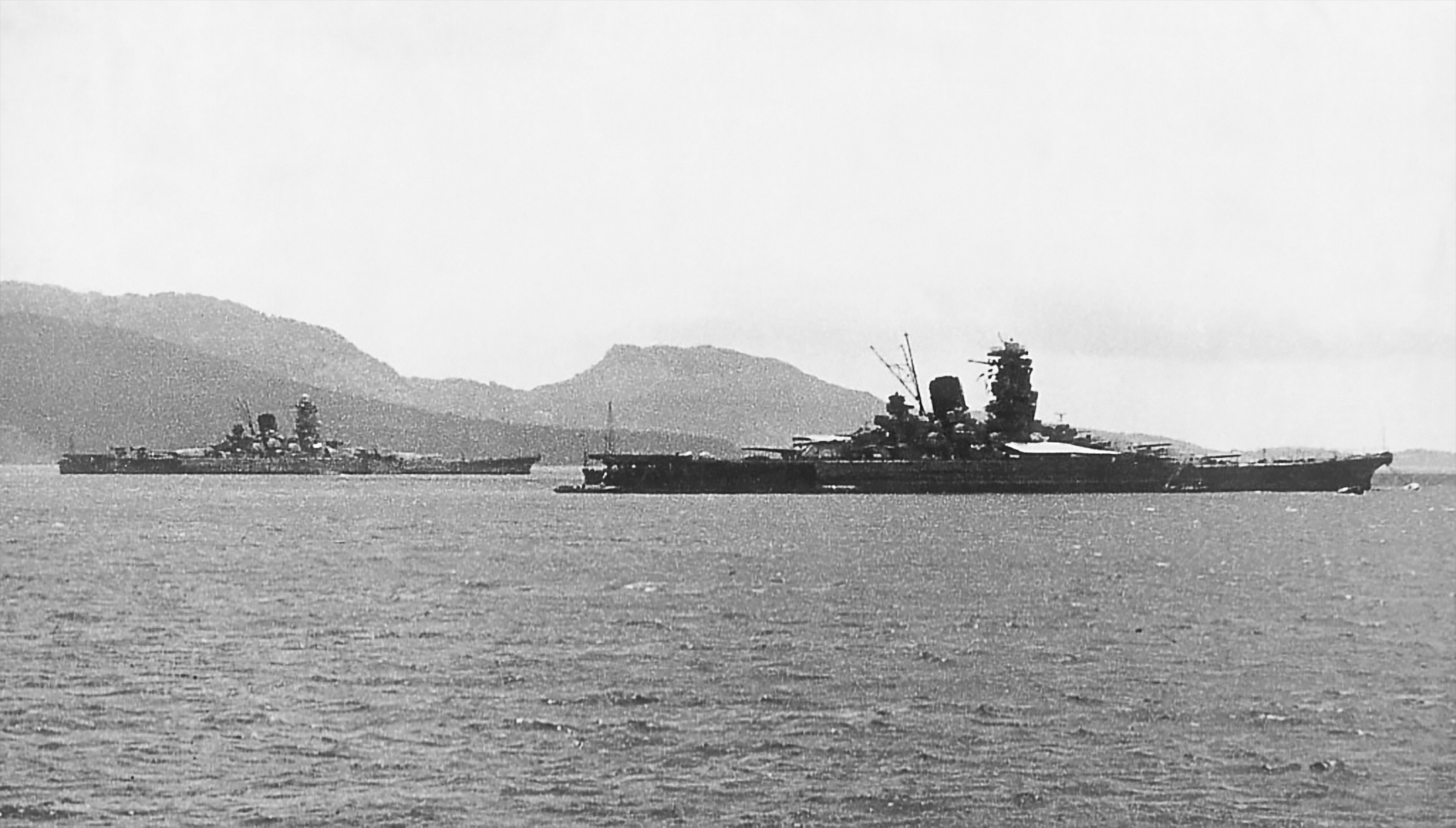
Yamato and Musashi, the two largest battleships ever built

The Yamato-class battleships (大和型戦艦, Yamato-gata senkan) were built at the beginning of the Pacific War. The ships were the largest and most heavily armed battleships ever constructed. Two ships (Yamato and Musashi) were completed as battleships, while a third (Shinano) was converted to an aircraft carrier during construction. A fourth ship was scrapped while still under construction and a planned fifth ship was never begun.

Due to the threat of American submarines and aircraft carriers and worsening fuel shortages, both Yamato and Musashi spent the majority of their careers in naval bases at Brunei, Truk, and Kure—deploying on several occasions in response to American raids on Japanese bases—before participating in the Battle of Leyte Gulf in October 1944, as part of Vice Admiral Kurita's Center Force. Musashi was sunk during the battle by American airplanes. Shinano was sunk ten days after her commissioning in November 1944 by the American submarine Archerfish while Yamato was sunk by US carrier aircraft in April 1945 during Operation Ten-Go.

Ship	Armament	Armor	Displacement	Propulsion	Service		
Ship	Armament	Armor	Displacement	Propulsion	Laid down	Commissioned	Fate
Yamato (大和)	3 × triple 46 cm (18.1 in) guns	410 mm	61,331 long tons (62,315 t)	4 shafts, 4 steam turbines, 27 knots (50 km/h; 31 mph)	4 November 1937	16 December 1941	Sunk in air attack, 7 April 1945
Musashi (武蔵)	3 × triple 46 cm (18.1 in) guns	410 mm	61,331 long tons (62,315 t)	4 shafts, 4 steam turbines, 27 knots (50 km/h; 31 mph)	29 March 1938	5 August 1942	Sunk in air attack, 24 October 1944
Shinano (信濃)	3 × triple 46 cm (18.1 in) guns	410 mm	61,331 long tons (62,315 t)	4 shafts, 4 steam turbines, 27 knots (50 km/h; 31 mph)	4 May 1940	19 November 1944	Converted to an aircraft carrier, sunk by submarine, 28 November 1944
No. 111	3 × triple 46 cm (18.1 in) guns	410 mm	61,331 long tons (62,315 t)	4 shafts, 4 steam turbines, 27 knots (50 km/h; 31 mph)	7 July 1940	—N/a	—N/a

=== Design A-150 ===
"Design A-150", popularly known as the Super Yamato class, was a planned class of battleships. In keeping with the IJN's long-held doctrine of qualitative superiority, they were designed to be the most powerful battleships afloat. As part of this, the class would have been armed with six 51 cm (20.1 in) guns, the largest weapons carried aboard any warship in the world. Design work on the A-150s began after the preceding Yamato class was mostly finished by early 1941, when the Japanese began focusing on aircraft carriers and other smaller warships in preparation for the coming conflict. No A-150 would ever be laid down, and many details of the class's design were destroyed near the end of the war.

Ship	Armament	Armor	Displacement	Propulsion	Service		
Ship	Armament	Armor	Displacement	Propulsion	Laid down	Commissioned	Fate
No. 798	3 × twin 51 cm (20.1 in) guns	Probably 457 mm (18 in)	Approximately 70,000 long tons (71,000 t)	Unknown	—N/a	—N/a	—N/a
No. 799	3 × twin 51 cm (20.1 in) guns	Probably 457 mm (18 in)	Approximately 70,000 long tons (71,000 t)	Unknown	—N/a	—N/a	—N/a
