= Characters of the Final Fantasy series =

Characters of the Final Fantasy series may refer to:

- Characters of Final Fantasy IV and The After Years
- Characters of Final Fantasy V
- Characters of Final Fantasy VI
- Characters of the Final Fantasy VII series
- Characters of Final Fantasy VIII
- Characters of Final Fantasy IX
- Characters of Final Fantasy X and X-2
- Characters of Final Fantasy XII
- Characters of the Final Fantasy XIII series
- Characters of Final Fantasy XV
- Characters of Final Fantasy XVI
- Characters of the Final Fantasy Type-0 universe
