= Pagoda mast =

Distinctive superstructure of the Imperial Japanese Navy ships of World War II

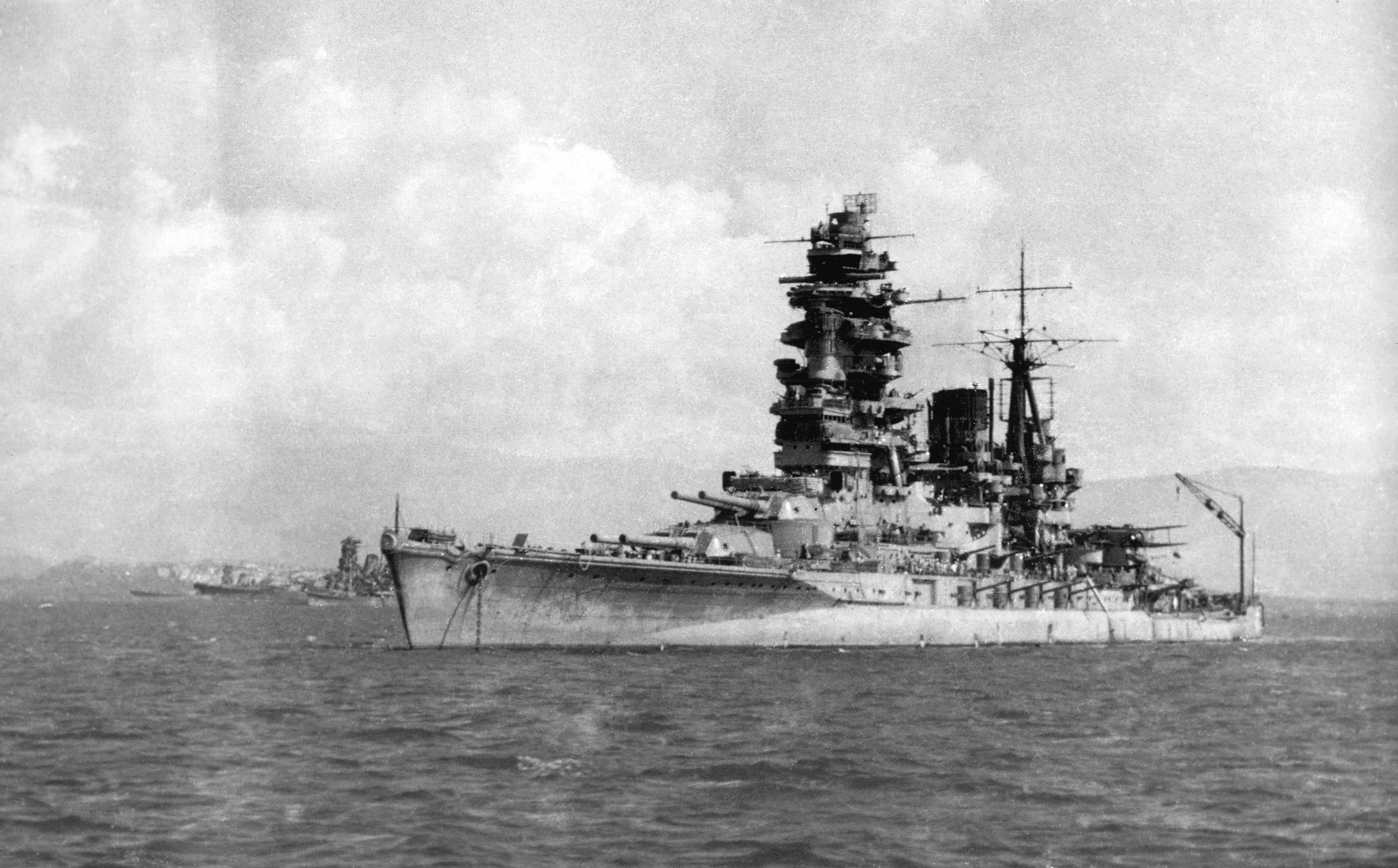
Pagoda mast on the Japanese battleship Nagato (1944)

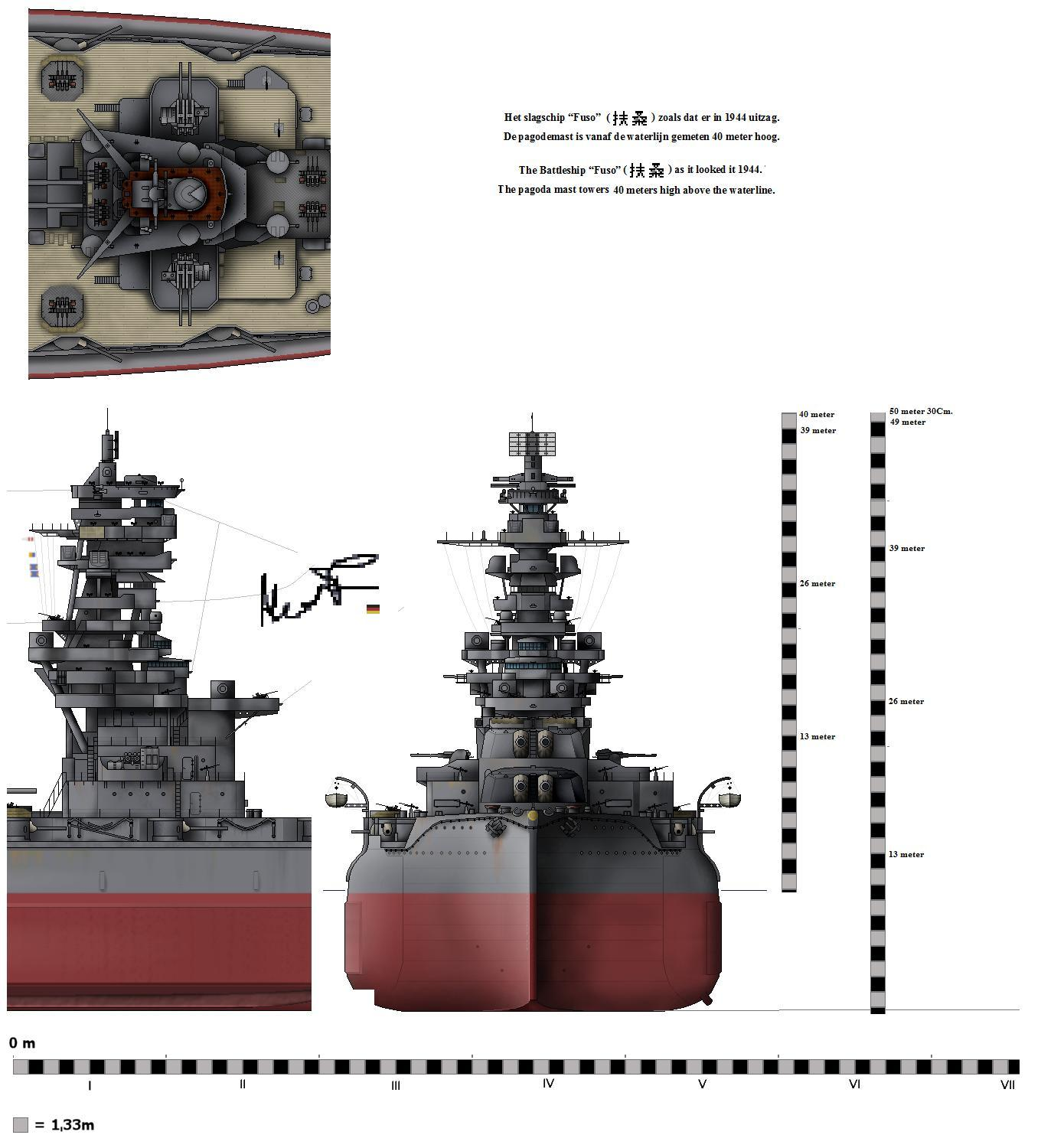
The typical pagoda mast of Fusō, which towered 40 m (130 ft) above the waterline

A pagoda mast was a type of superstructure erected on a tripod mast that was common on Japanese capital ships that were reconstructed during the 1930s in a bid to improve their fighting performance. These modifications were deemed to be necessary by the Imperial Japanese Navy as a result of the "Battleships Holiday" that was imposed by the Washington Naval Treaty, which strictly limited the construction of new battleships.

== Development ==
Pagoda masts were built on existing tripod masts by adding searchlight and other platforms, lookouts and shelters upon each other, the result resembling a pagoda temple. The superstructures were constructed on the majority of the ships that were rebuilt by the Japanese during the 1930s, including the Kongō-class battlecruisers and the Fusō, Ise, and Nagato-class battleships.

The additional platforms were supported on the ships' original tripod foremasts (a design also extensively used by the Royal Navy), which were suitably strengthened to bear the extra weight. As completed, the masts could reach 40 m (130 ft) or more above the waterline.

Like the British Royal Navy, which was considered to be a likely enemy of Japan in the event of an armed conflict, the Imperial Japanese Navy wanted to prepare their warships for engaging in night combat. Before the outbreak of World War II, powerful searchlights were placed on the pagoda masts to illuminate enemy ships at night. In the navies of Europe and the Americas, these tall pagoda-style masts were generally frowned upon. Naval architects and sailors from the Western hemisphere claimed that the Japanese battleships were too "top-heavy"; critics often mocked these vessels by nicknaming them "Christmas Trees".

During the same interwar period, the Royal Navy implemented the "Queen Anne's Mansions"–style bridge tower designs as part of refits of World War I–era battleships (three of the Queen Elizabeth class, HMS Renown), as well as for the navy's new battleships (the Nelson and King George V classes). Between World War I and World War II, the US Navy gradually phased out the lattice masts on its Standard-type battleships in favor of tripod masts, and after Pearl Harbor some of the salvaged battleships were reconstructed with masts similar to those on its post-treaty battleships.

With the "A-140-F6" design being selected as Japan's first post-WWI era battleship class in 1937, the Hiei received what would be the final iteration of the pagoda mast to help evaluate the equipment and workspace arrangements being planned for the forward superstructures of the new ships.

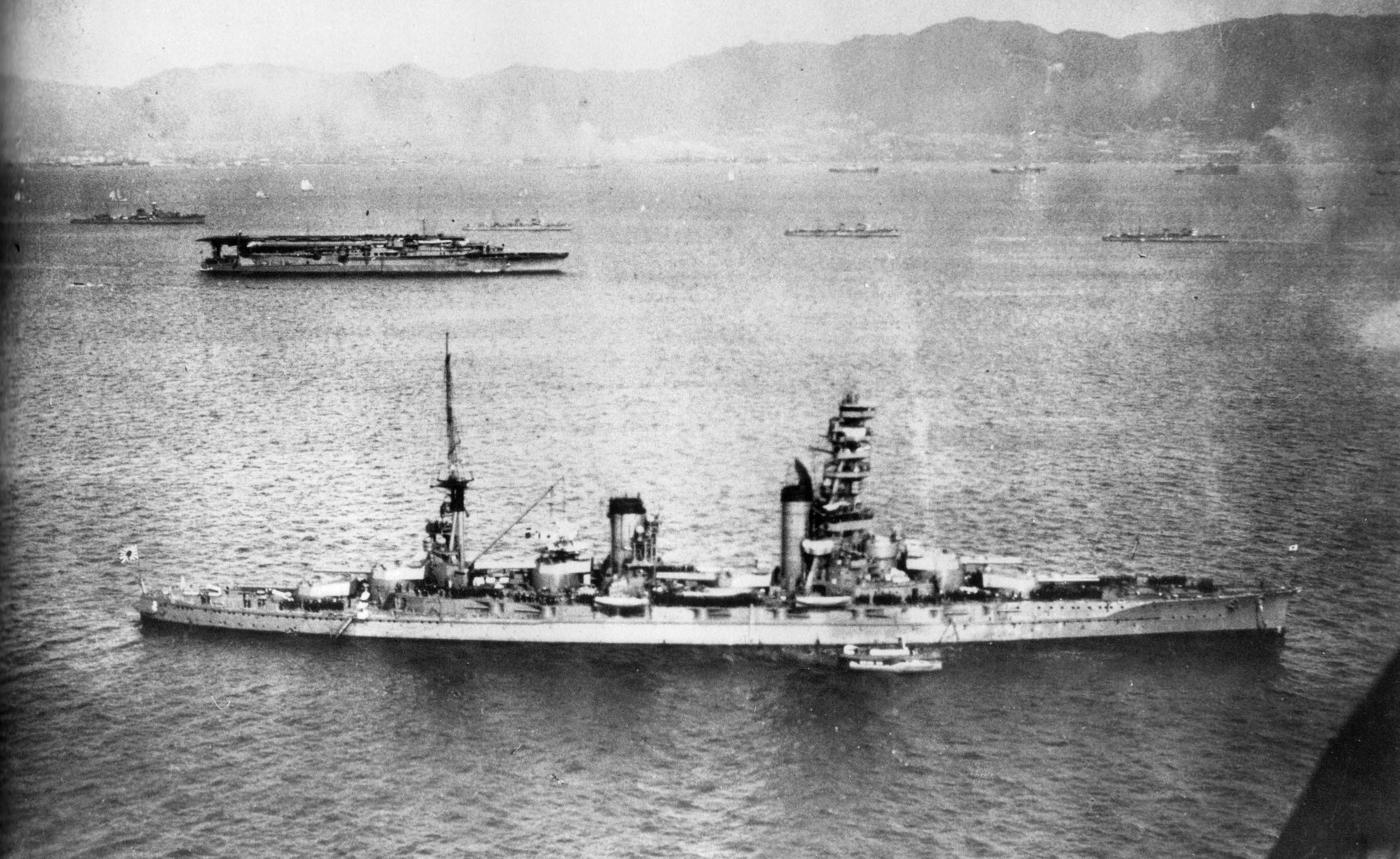
Japanese battleship Yamashiro (foreground) in October 1930, with original tripod mast

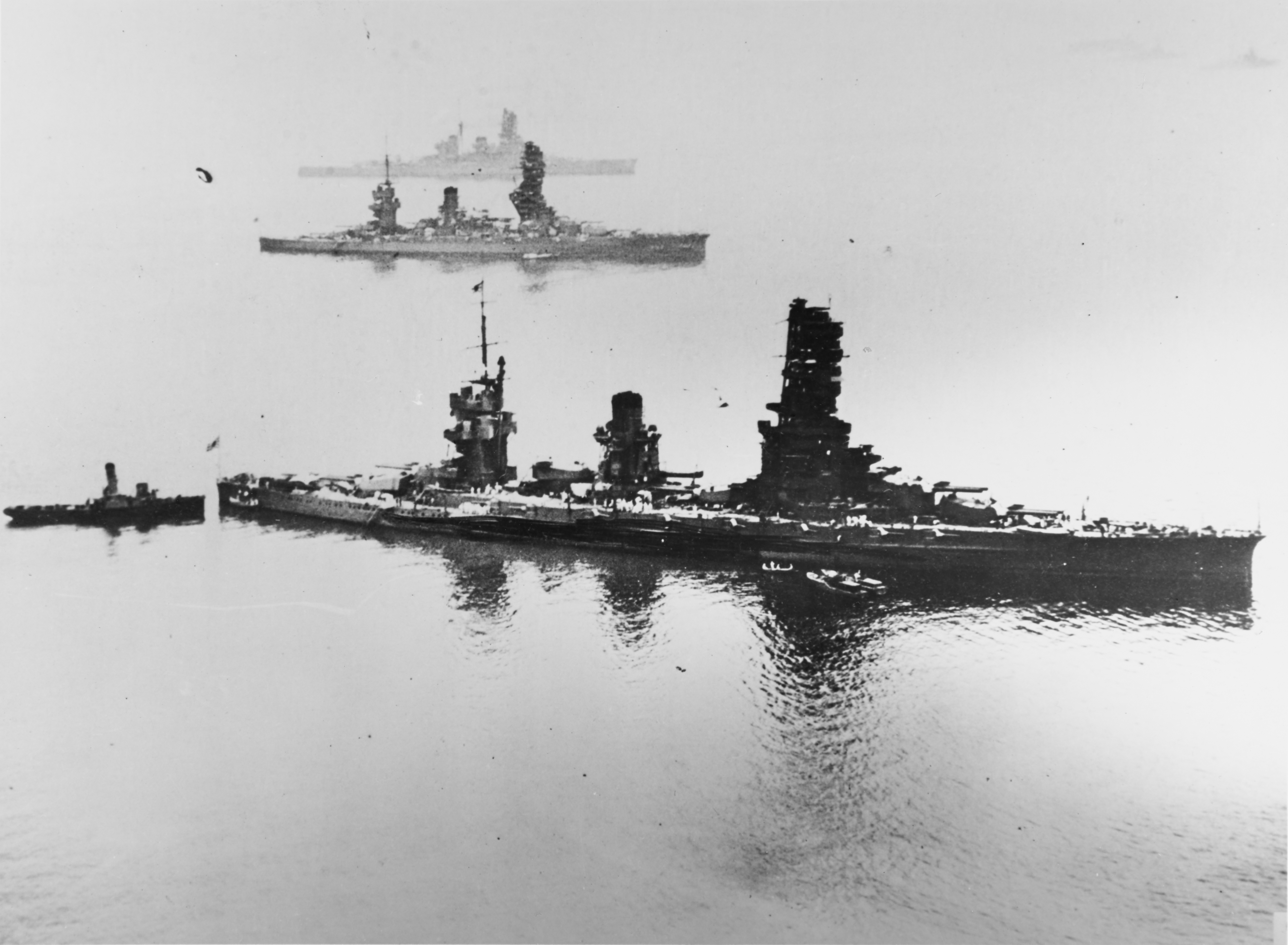
Pagoda masts on the battleships Yamashiro (foreground), Fusō and Haruna

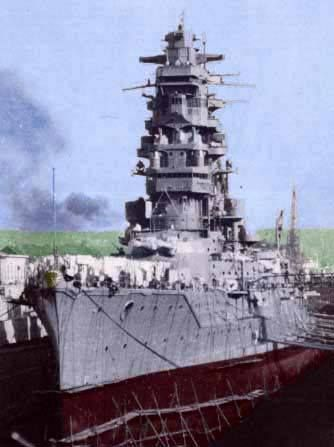
Hiei, after her 1937-1940 overhaul. Although the upcoming "Design A-140-F6" battleships would not be fitted with foremasts, this final iteration on the pagoda mast approximated the crew stations and equipment arrangements planned for the forward superstructures of the new generation of battleships..

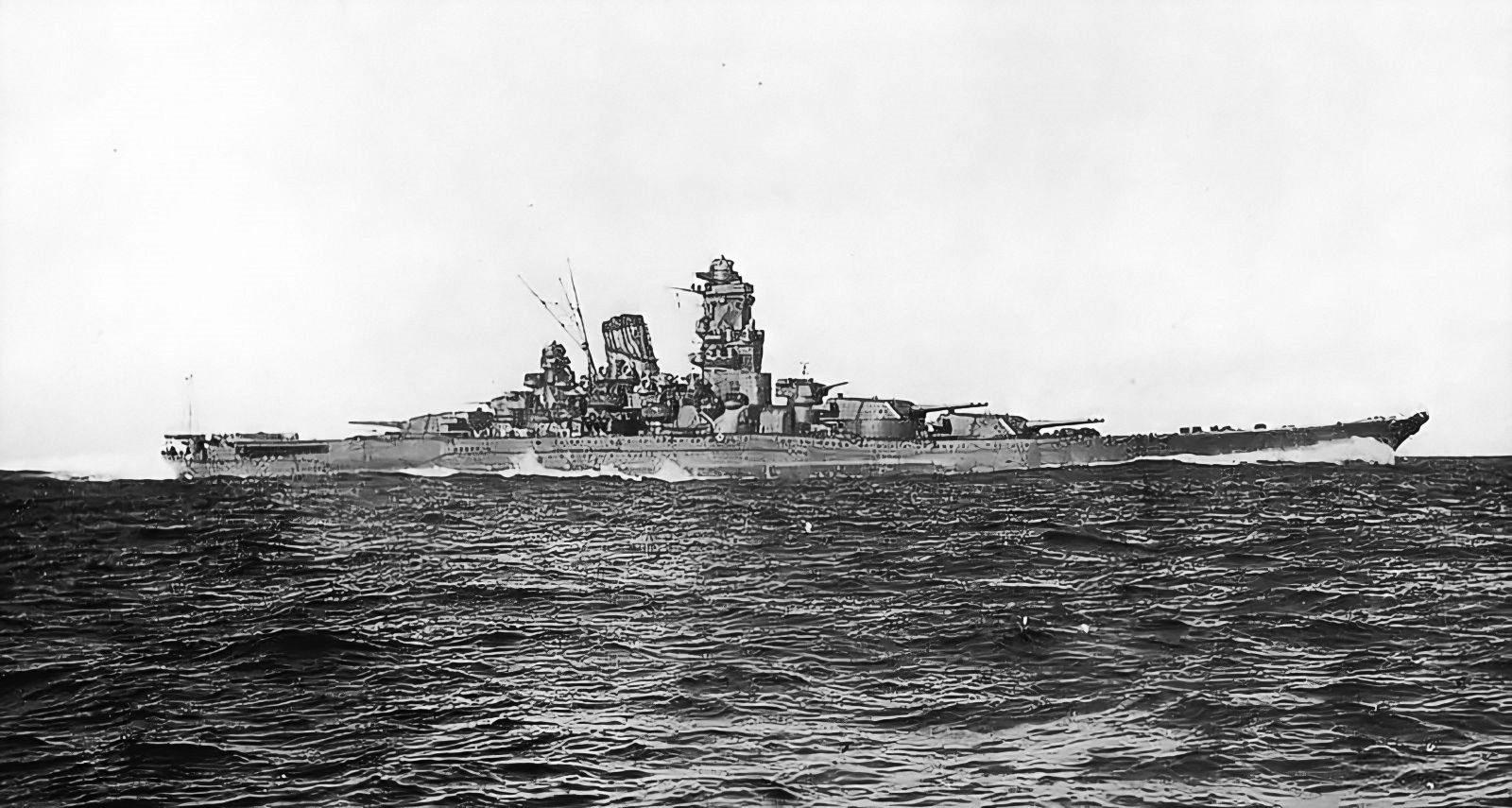
Yamato

== Example ==
Chronological images of the Japanese battleship Ise, showing the development of her pagoda mast over time.

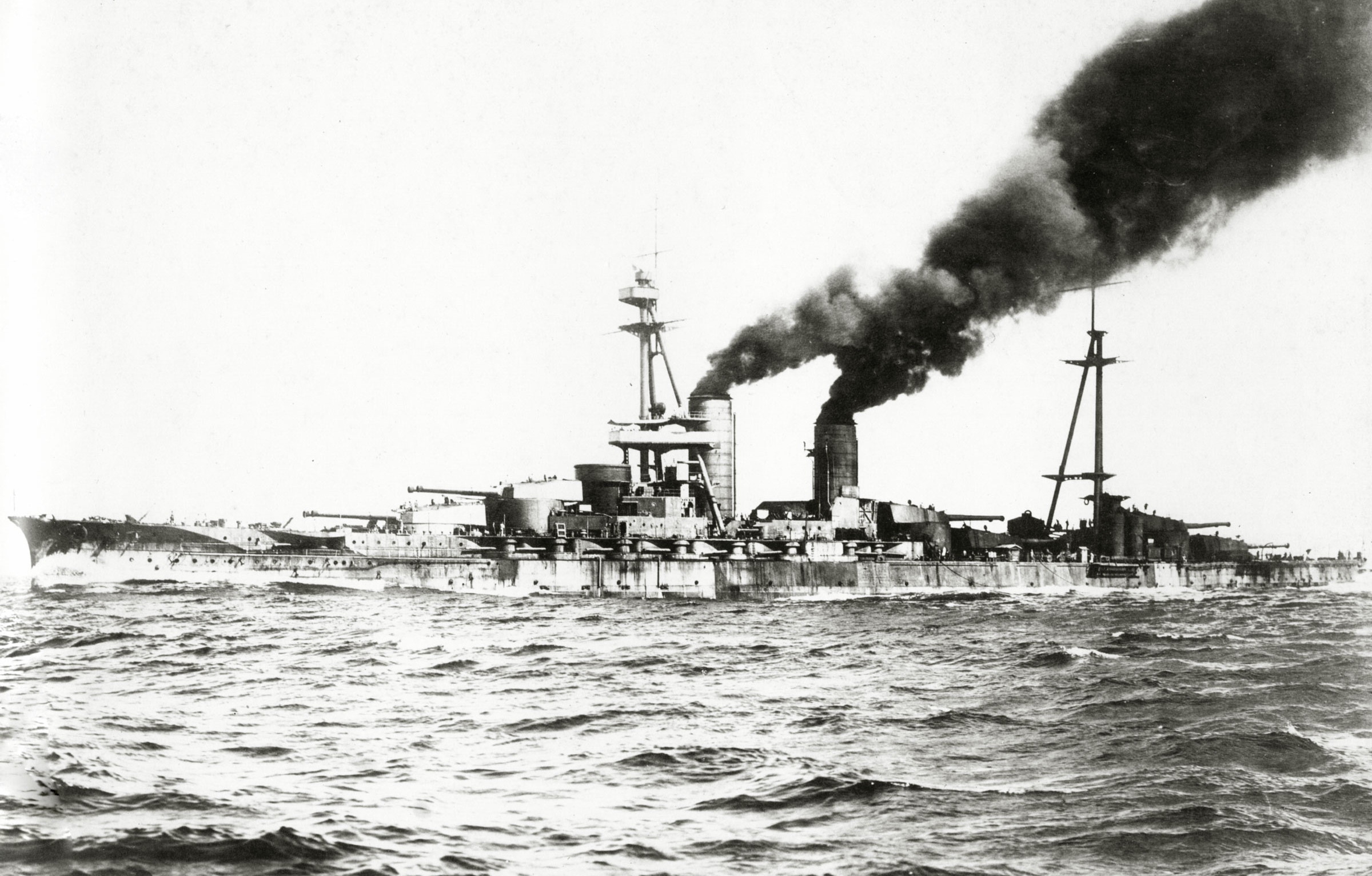
Japanese battleship Ise in 1917–1918, shortly after completion

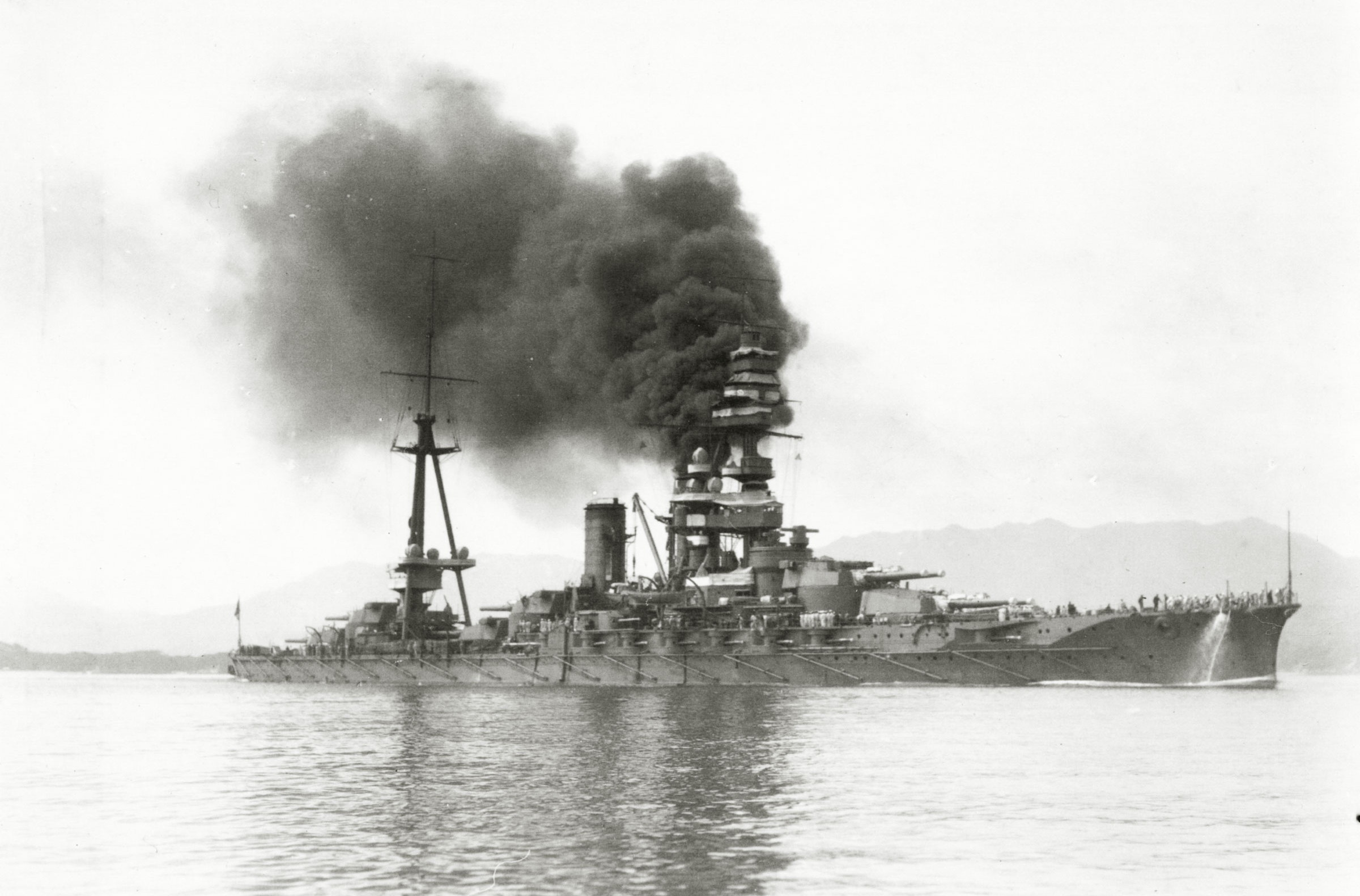
Ise, unknown date, with tripod mast

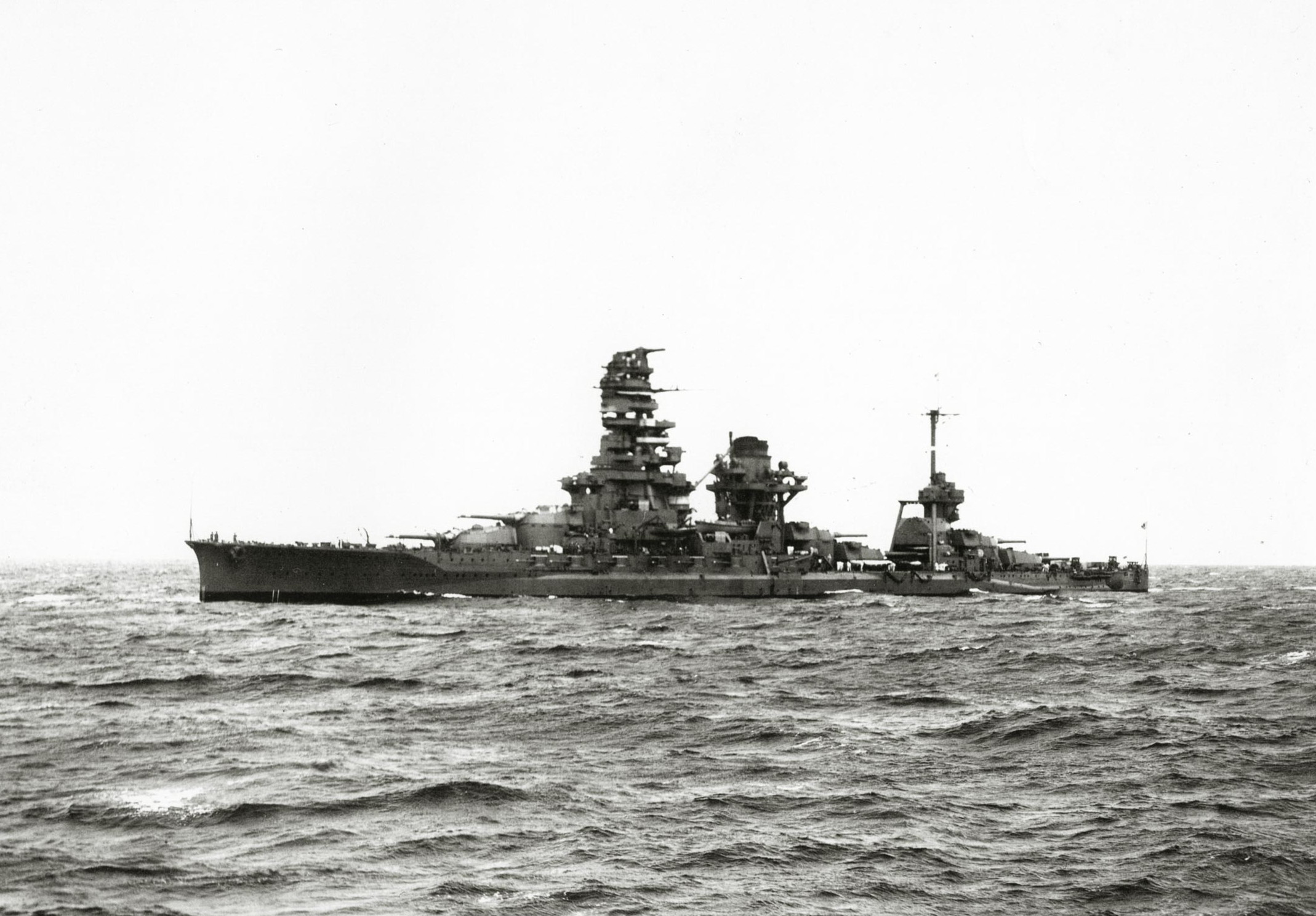
Ise, after reconstruction

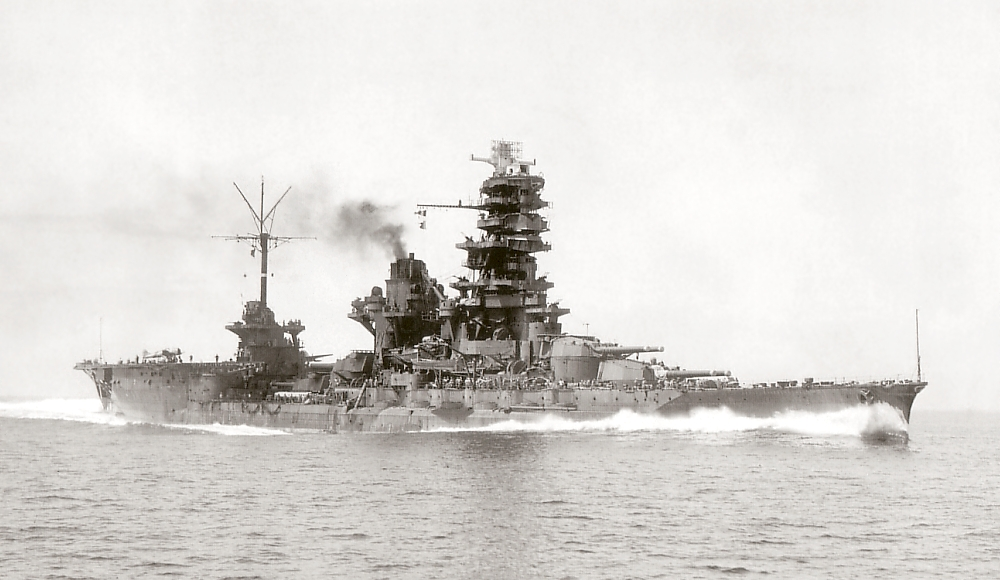
Higher resolution image of Ise, c. 1943
