= Nagato-class battleship =

Class of Japanese battleships

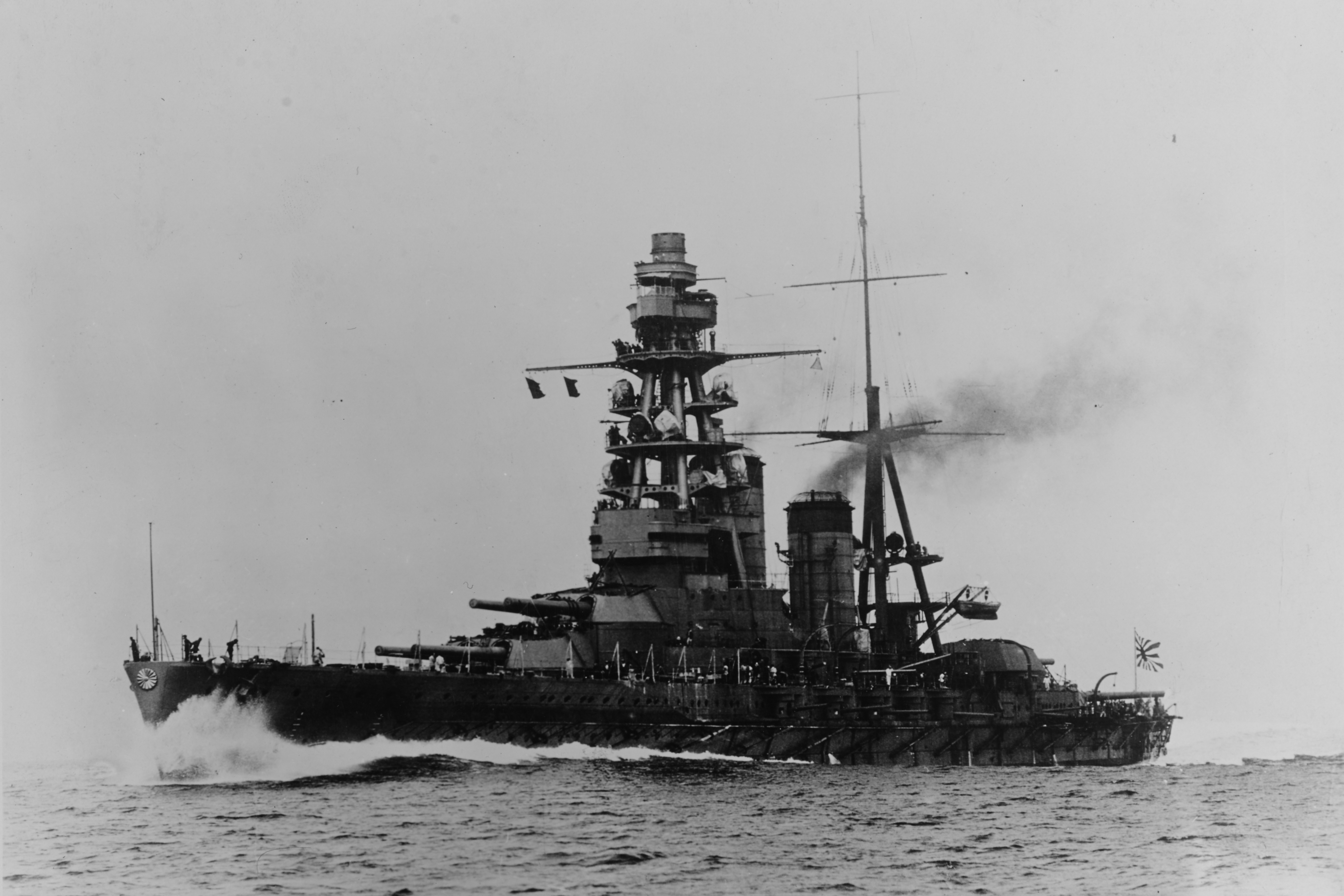
- Nagato at sea

Class overview
- Name: Nagato class
- Builders: Kure Naval Arsenal; Yokosuka Naval Arsenal
- Operators: Imperial Japanese Navy
- Preceded by: Ise class
- Succeeded by: Tosa class (planned); Yamato class (actual)
- Built: 1917–1921
- In service: 1920–1945
- Completed: 2
- Lost: 1

General characteristics (as built)
- Type: Dreadnought battleship
- Displacement: 32,720 t (32,200 long tons) (standard); 39,116 t (38,498 long tons) (full load)
- Length: 215.8 m (708 ft) (o/a)
- Beam: 29.02 m (95 ft 3 in)
- Draft: 9.08 m (29 ft 9 in)
- Installed power: 21 × water-tube boilers; 80,000 shp (60,000 kW)
- Propulsion: 4 shafts; 4 × geared steam turbines
- Speed: 26.5 knots (49.1 km/h; 30.5 mph)
- Range: 5,500 nmi (10,200 km; 6,300 mi) at 16 knots (30 km/h; 18 mph)
- Complement: 1,333
- Armament: 4 × twin 41 cm (16.1 in) guns; 20 × single 14 cm (5.5 in) guns; 4 × single 7.62 cm (3 in) AA guns; 8 × 53.3 cm (21 in) torpedo tubes
- Armor: Waterline belt: 100–305 mm (3.9–12.0 in); Deck: 144 mm (5.7 in); Gun turrets: 190–305 mm (7.5–12.0 in); Barbettes: 305 mm (12.0 in); Conning tower: 369 mm (14.5 in)

General characteristics (Nagato, 1944)
- Displacement: 39,130 t (38,510 long tons) (standard); 46,690 t (45,950 long tons) (deep load)
- Length: 224.94 m (738 ft 0 in) (o/a)
- Beam: 34.6 m (113 ft 6 in)
- Draft: 9.49 m (31 ft 2 in)
- Installed power: 82,300 shp (61,400 kW); 10 × water-tube boilers
- Speed: 25 knots (46 km/h; 29 mph)
- Range: 8,650 nmi (16,020 km; 9,950 mi) at 16 knots (30 km/h; 18 mph)
- Complement: 1,734
- Sensors & processing systems: 1 × Type 21 air search radar; 2 × Type 13 early warning radars; 2 × Type 22 surface search radars
- Armament: 4 × twin 41 cm guns; 18 × single 14 cm guns; 4 × twin 12.7 cm (5 in) DP guns; 98 × 25 mm (1 in) AA guns
- Armor: Belt: 100–305 mm (3.9–12.0 in); Deck: 51–152 mm (2.0–6.0 in); Barbettes: 376 mm (14.8 in)
- Aircraft carried: 3 × floatplanes
- Aviation facilities: 1 × catapult

The Nagato-class battleships (長門型戦艦, Nagato-gata senkan) were a pair of dreadnought battleships (lead ship Nagato and her sister ship Mutsu) built for the Imperial Japanese Navy (IJN) towards the end of World War I, although they were not completed until after the war. The last of Japan's pre-Treaty capital ships, they were the first class to carry 41 cm (16.1 in) guns, the largest afloat at the time and the first bigger than 15 inches (381 mm). Nagato, the lead ship of the class, frequently served as a flagship. Both ships carried supplies for the survivors of the Great Kantō earthquake in 1923. They were modernized in 1933–1936 with improvements to their armor and machinery and a rebuilt superstructure in the pagoda mast style. Nagato and Mutsu briefly participated in the Second Sino-Japanese War in 1937 and Nagato was the flagship of Admiral Isoroku Yamamoto during the attack on Pearl Harbor on 7 December 1941 that began the Pacific War.

The sisters participated in the Battle of Midway in June 1942, although they did not see any combat. Mutsu saw more active service than her sister because she was not a flagship and participated in the Battle of the Eastern Solomons in August before returning to Japan in early 1943.

One of Mutsu's aft magazines detonated in June, killing 1,121 crew and visitors and destroying the ship. The IJN conducted a perfunctory investigation into the cause of her loss and concluded that it was the work of a disgruntled crewmember. They dispersed the survivors in an attempt to conceal the sinking to keep up morale in Japan. Much of the wreck was salvaged after the war and many artifacts and relics are on display in Japan.

Nagato spent most of the first two years of the war training in home waters. She was transferred to Truk in mid-1943, but did not see any combat until the Battle of the Philippine Sea in mid-1944 when she was attacked by American aircraft. Nagato did not fire her main armament against enemy vessels until the Battle of Leyte Gulf in October 1944. She was lightly damaged during the battle and returned to Japan the following month for repairs. The IJN was running out of fuel by this time and decided not to fully repair her. Nagato was converted into a floating anti-aircraft platform and assigned to coastal defense duties. After the war, the ship was a target for U.S. nuclear weapon tests during Operation Crossroads in mid-1946. She survived the first test with little damage, but was sunk by the second test.

== Background ==
The IJN considered a battle fleet of eight modern battleships and eight modern armored cruisers necessary for the defense of Japan, and the government adopted that policy in 1907. This was the genesis of the Eight-Eight Fleet Program, the development of a cohesive battle line of 16 capital ships less than eight years old. Advances in naval technology like the British battleship HMS Dreadnought and the battlecruiser HMS Invincible forced the IJN to several times re-evaluate the ships that it counted as modern. By 1910, the IJN considered none of its current ships to be modern and restarted the program in 1911 with orders for the Fusō-class dreadnoughts and the Kongō-class battlecruisers. By 1915, the IJN was halfway to its goal and wanted to order four more dreadnoughts, but the Diet rejected its plan, and the 1916 budget authorized only one dreadnought, later named Nagato, and two battlecruisers. Later that year, American President Woodrow Wilson announced plans for 10 additional battleships and six battlecruisers, and the following year the Diet authorized three more dreadnoughts in response, one of which would later be named Mutsu.

== Design ==
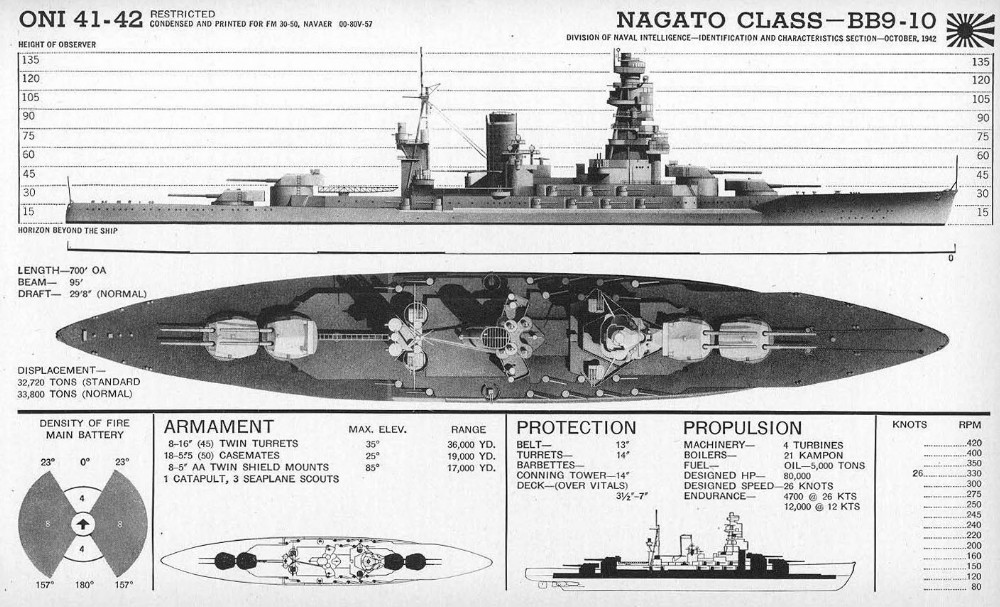
Office of Naval Intelligence recognition drawing of the Nagato class

Allocated project number A-102, the Nagato class was designed before Commander Yuzuru Hiraga was reassigned to the Navy Technical Department (NTD) responsible for ship design, although Hiraga is often credited with the design of these ships. (Note: Nagato was ordered on 12 May 1916 and Hiraga returned to the NTD three days later.) In contrast to earlier designs, the Nagato class used the American "all or nothing" armor scheme that maximized the armor thickness protecting the core of the ship by eliminating armor elsewhere. The design had two armored decks of medium thickness rather than the single thicker deck used formerly. The ships also used a new type of underwater protection system that successfully resisted penetration by 200-kilogram (440 lb) torpedo warheads in full-scale trials. It consisted of a deep water-tight compartment adjacent to the hull, backed by a thick torpedo bulkhead that connected to the side and deck armor plates, with a deep fuel oil tank behind it.

Although the United States Navy planned to arm its Colorado class with 16-inch (406 mm) guns before the Nagato class was designed, Nagato's 410-millimeter (16.1 in) guns made her the first dreadnought that was launched armed with guns larger than 15 inches (381 mm).

On 12 June 1917, well before Mutsu was laid down, Hiraga proposed a revised design for the ship that reflected the lessons from the Battle of Jutland that had occurred the previous year, and incorporated advances in boiler technology. Given project number A-125, his design added an extra twin main-gun turret, using space and weight made available by the reduction of the number of boilers from 21 to 12, while the power remained the same. He reduced the secondary armament from 20 guns to 16, although they were raised in height to improve their ability to fire during heavy weather and to improve their arcs of fire. To increase the ship's protection he proposed angling the belt armor outwards to improve its resistance to horizontal fire, and increasing the thickness of the lower deck armor and the torpedo bulkhead. Hiraga also planned to add anti-torpedo bulges to improve underwater protection. He estimated that his ship would displace as much as Nagato, although it would cost about a million yen more. Hiraga's changes would have considerably delayed Mutsu's completion and were rejected by the Navy Ministry.

== Description ==
The ships had a length of 201.17 meters (660 ft) between perpendiculars and 215.8 meters (708 ft) overall. They had a beam of 29.02 meters (95 ft 3 in) and a draft of 9.08 meters (29 ft 9 in). The Nagato-class ships displaced 32,720 metric tons (32,200 long tons) at standard load and 39,116 metric tons (38,498 long tons) at full load. Their crew consisted of 1,333 officers and enlisted men as built and 1,368 in 1935. In 1944, the crew totaled around 1,734 men.

The Nagato class was equipped with a unique heptapodal (seven-legged) mast designed to maximize rigidity for range-finding purposes and survivability under shellfire. It consisted of a thick vertical leg in the center surrounded by six outer legs. The central leg was large enough to accommodate an electric elevator running between the foretop and main deck. In November 1944, the tops of Nagato's mainmast and funnel were removed to improve the arcs of fire for her anti-aircraft guns.

In 1927, Mutsu's bow was remodeled to reduce the amount of spray produced when steaming into a head sea. This increased her overall length by 1.59 meters (5 ft 3 in) to 217.39 meters (713 ft 3 in). This proved successful and her sister's bow was rebuilt in 1930. During their 1934–1936 reconstruction, the ships' sterns were lengthened by 7.55 meters (24.8 ft) to improve their speed and their forward superstructures were rebuilt into a pagoda mast. They were given torpedo bulges to improve their underwater protection and to compensate for the weight of the additional armor and equipment. These changes increased their overall length to 224.94 m (738 ft), their beam to 34.6 m (113 ft 6 in) and their draft to 9.49 meters (31 ft 2 in). Their displacement increased over 7,000 metric tons (6,900 long tons) to 46,690 metric tons (45,950 long tons) at deep load.

=== Propulsion ===
The ships were equipped with four Gihon geared steam turbines, each of which drove one 4.19-meter (13 ft 9 in) propeller. The turbines were designed to produce a total of 80,000 shaft horsepower (60,000 kW), using steam provided by 21 Kampon water-tube boilers; 15 of these were oil-fired while the remaining half-dozen used fuel oil that was sprayed on the coal to increase its burn rate. The boilers had a working pressure of 286 psi (1,972 kPa; 20 kgf/cm^{2}).

The ships had a stowage capacity of 1,600 long tons (1,626 t) of coal and 3,400 long tons (3,455 t) of oil, giving them a range of 5,500 nautical miles (10,200 km; 6,300 mi) at a speed of 16 knots (30 km/h; 18 mph). Nagato exceeded her designed speed of 26.5 knots (49.1 km/h; 30.5 mph) during her sea trials, reaching 26.7 knots (49.4 km/h; 30.7 mph) at 85,500 shp (63,800 kW) and Mutsu reached the same speed with 87,500 shp (65,200 kW). The US Navy did not learn their actual speed capability until about 1937; previously it had believed that the ships were capable of only 23 knots (43 km/h; 26 mph).

During refits in 1923–25, the fore funnel was rebuilt in a serpentine shape in an unsuccessful effort to prevent smoke interference with the bridge and fire-control systems. The rebuilt fore funnel was eliminated during the ships' 1930s reconstructions when their boilers were replaced by 10 oil-fired Kampon boilers, which had a working pressure of 313 psi (2,158 kPa; 22 kgf/cm^{2}) and temperature of 300 °C (572 °F). The turbines were also replaced by lighter, more modern, units and their propellers were replaced by larger 4.3-meter (14 ft 1 in) ones. When the ships conducted their post-reconstruction trials, they reached a speed of 24.98 knots (46.26 km/h; 28.75 mph) with 82,300 shp (61,400 kW). Additional fuel oil was stored in the bottoms of the newly added torpedo bulges, which increased their capacity to 5,560 long tons (5,650 t) and thus their range to 8,560 nmi (15,850 km; 9,850 mi) at 16 knots.

=== Armament ===
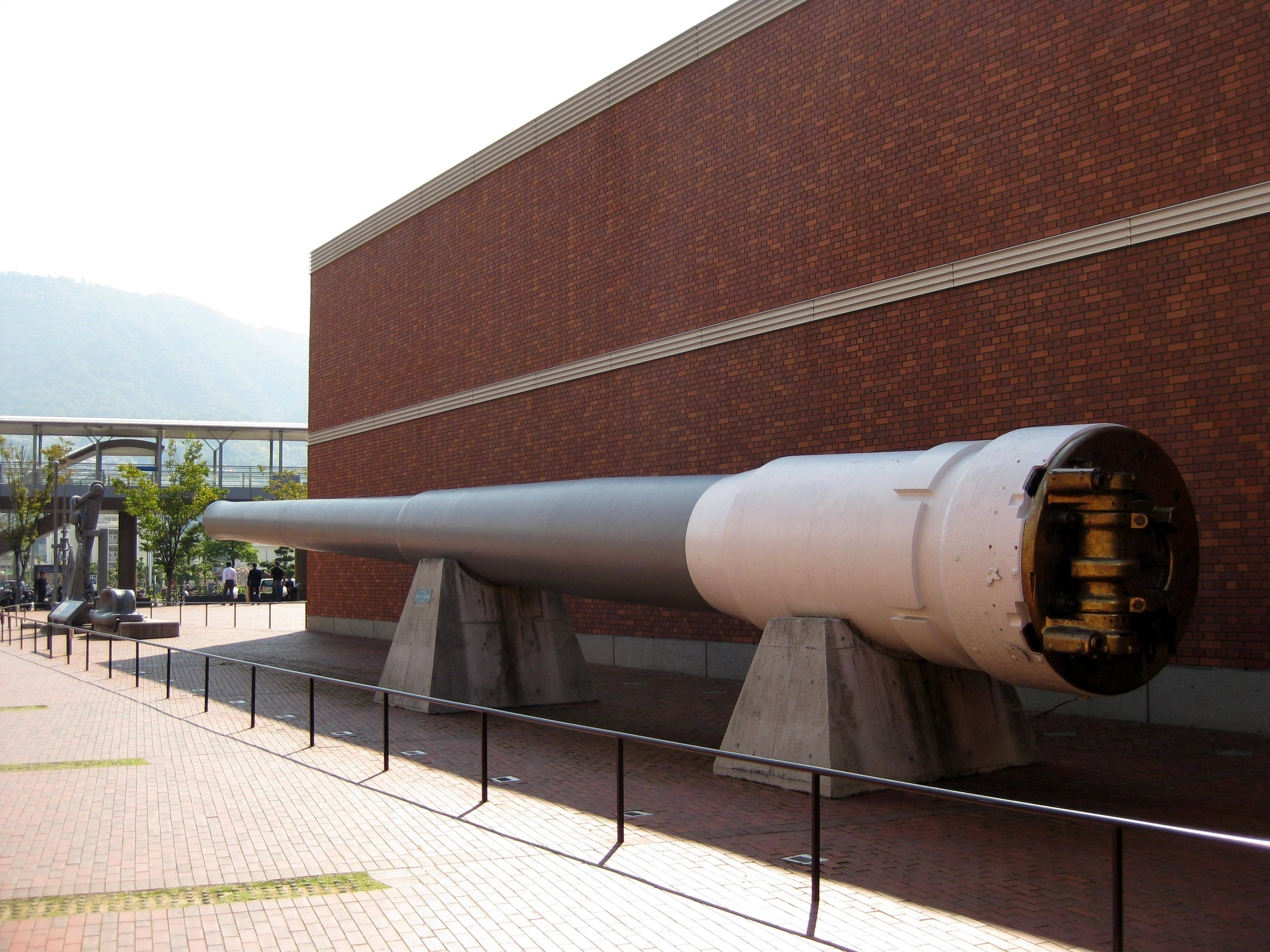
A 41 cm 3rd Year Type gun from Mutsu on display at the Yamato Museum in Kure, Japan

The main armament of the Nagato-class ships consisted of eight 45-caliber 41 cm (16.1 in) 3rd Year Type naval guns, mounted in two pairs of twin-gun, superfiring turrets fore and aft. Numbered one through four from front to rear, the hydraulically powered turrets gave the guns an elevation range of −2 to +35 degrees. The rate of fire for the guns was around two rounds per minute. Their turrets were replaced in the mid-1930s using the turrets stored from the unfinished Tosa-class battleships. While in storage they were modified to increase their range of elevation to −3 to +43 degrees, which increased the gun's maximum range from 30,200 to 37,900 meters (33,000 to 41,400 yd).

By World War II, the guns used Type 91 armor-piercing, capped shells. Each of these shells weighed 1,020 kilograms (2,250 lb) and had a muzzle velocity of 780 meters per second (2,600 ft/s). Also available was a 936-kilogram (2,064 lb) high-explosive shell that had a muzzle velocity of 805 meters per second (2,640 ft/s). A special Type 3 Sankaidan incendiary shrapnel shell was developed in the 1930s for anti-aircraft use.

The ships' secondary armament of twenty 50-caliber 14 cm (5.5 in) 3rd Year Type naval gun was mounted in casemates on the upper sides of the hull and in the superstructure. The latter guns had a maximum elevation of +20 degrees and the former could elevate to +25 degrees which gave them ranges of 15,800 meters (17,300 yd) and 17,000 meters (19,000 yd) respectively. Each gun could fire a 38-kilogram (84 lb) high-explosive projectile at a rate up to 10 rounds per minute. Anti-aircraft defense was provided by four 40-caliber 3rd Year Type 3-inch (Note: These guns were license-built British quick-firing (QF) QF 12-pounder guns. While the Japanese designated them as 8 cm, their actual caliber was 76.2 millimeters.) AA guns in single mounts. The 3-inch (76 mm) high-angle guns had a maximum elevation of +75 degrees, and had a rate of fire of 13 to 20 rounds per minute. They fired a 6 kg (13 lb) projectile with a muzzle velocity of 680 m/s (2,200 ft/s) to a maximum height of 7,500 meters (24,600 ft). The ships were also fitted with eight 53.3-centimeter (21 in) torpedo tubes, four on each broadside, two above water and two submerged. They used the 6th Year Type torpedo which had a 203-kilogram (448 lb) warhead of Shimose powder. It had three settings for range and speed: 15,500 meters (17,000 yd) at 26 knots (48 km/h; 30 mph), 10,000 meters (11,000 yd) at 32 knots (59 km/h; 37 mph), or 7,000 meters (7,700 yd) at 37 knots (69 km/h; 43 mph).

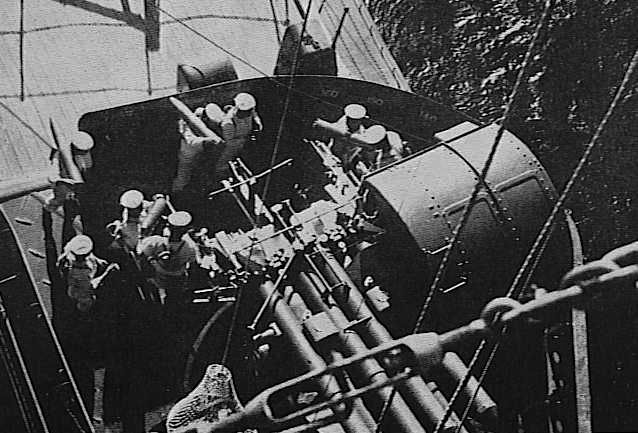
A twin 127 mm gun mount aboard Nagato

Around 1926, the four above-water torpedo tubes were removed and the ships received three additional 76-millimeter AA guns that were situated around the base of the foremast. They were replaced by eight 40-caliber 12.7-centimeter Type 89 dual-purpose guns in 1932, fitted on both sides of the fore and aft superstructures in four twin-gun mounts. When firing at surface targets, the guns had a range of 14,700 meters (16,100 yd). Their maximum rate of fire was 14 rounds a minute, but their sustained rate of fire was around eight rounds per minute. Two twin-gun mounts for license-built Vickers 2-pounder light AA guns were also added to the ship that same year. (Note: Skwiot says two single mounts in 1932–34 and another pair, mounted near the aft funnel, were added in 1934.) They had a rate of fire of 200 rounds per minute.

When the ships were reconstructed in 1934–36, the remaining torpedo tubes and the two forward 14-centimeter guns were removed from the hull. All of the remaining 14-centimeter guns had their elevation increased to +35 degrees which increased their range to 20,000 meters (22,000 yd). An unknown number of license-built 13.2-millimeter Hotchkiss machine guns in twin mounts were also added. The maximum range of these guns was 6,500 meters (7,100 yd), but the effective range against aircraft was 700–1,500 meters (770–1,640 yd). The cyclic rate was adjustable between 425 and 475 rounds per minute, but the need to change the 30-round magazines reduced the effective rate to 250 rounds per minute.

The 2-pounders were replaced in 1939 by 20 license-built Hotchkiss 25-millimeter Type 96 light AA guns in a mixture of twin-gun and single mounts. This was the standard Japanese light AA gun during World War II, but it suffered from severe design shortcomings that rendered it a largely ineffective weapon. According to historian Mark Stille, the twin and triple mounts "lacked sufficient speed in train or elevation; the gun sights were unable to handle fast targets; the gun exhibited excessive vibration; the magazine was too small, and, finally, the gun produced excessive muzzle blast". These 25-millimeter (0.98 in) guns had an effective range of 1,500–3,000 meters (1,600–3,300 yd). The maximum effective rate of fire was only between 110 and 120 rounds per minute because of the frequent need to change the 15-round magazines. As far as is known, no additional AA guns were installed aboard Mutsu before her loss. Additional 25-millimeter guns were installed aboard Nagato during the war; on 10 July 1944, she was reported to have 98 guns on board. An additional 30 guns were added during a refit in Yokosuka in November. Two more twin 127-millimeter gun mounts were added at the same time abreast the funnel and all of her 14-centimeter guns were removed as she was now a floating anti-aircraft battery.

=== Armor ===
Cross-section of the armor scheme after reconstruction

The Nagato-class ships' waterline armor belt was made from Vickers cemented armor and protected 137.14 meters (449.9 ft) of the hull between the barbettes of the end turrets. The lower strake was 305 mm (12 in) thick, 2.7 meters (8 ft 10 in) high, and tapered to a thickness of 100 mm (3.9 in) at its bottom edge; above it was a strake of 229 mm (9 in) armor that was 1.7 meters (5 ft 7 in) high. Approximately 1.77 meters (5 ft 10 in) of the armor belt was below the waterline. The turrets were protected with an armor thickness of 305 mm on the face, 230–190 mm (9.1–7.5 in) on the sides, and 152–127 mm (6–5 in) on the roof. The barbettes were protected by armor 305 mm thick, while the casemates of the 140 mm guns were protected by 25 mm armor plates. The sides of the conning tower were 369 mm (14.5 in) thick.

The main deck armor consisted of three layers of high-tensile steel (HTS) 69 mm (2.7 in) thick that connected to the top of the upper strake of side armor. The flat portion of the lower deck had one layer of Ducol steel 25 mm thick with two layers of HTS of equal thickness above it. About 3 meters (9 ft 10 in) from the side of the hull, this deck, now composed of three layers of HTS, totaling 75 mm (3 in) in thickness, sloped downwards where it met a short horizontal armored (three layers of HTS with a total thickness of 66 mm (3 in)) deck that connected to the main armored belt and the torpedo bulkhead. This was also made up of three 25 mm layers of HTS (Note: This was intended to be a single plate of New Vickers non-cemented armor of equal thickness, but it could not be formed into the required shape.) and curved up and outwards to meet the short horizontal armored deck. It enclosed a water-tight compartment that was 3.05 meters (10 ft 0 in) from the side of the ship. It was backed by fuel oil tanks 3.13 meters (10 ft 3 in) deep. The outermost void was designed to allow the explosive force of a torpedo's warhead to dissipate as much as possible while the oil tank was supposed to stop any fragments from penetrating the innermost bulkhead protecting the ship's vital areas.

The new 41 cm turrets installed during their reconstruction were more heavily armored than the original ones. Face armor was increased to 460 mm (18 in), the sides to 280 mm (11 in), and the roof to 230–250 mm (9–10 in). The armor over the machinery and magazines was increased by 38 mm (1.5 in) on the upper deck and 25 mm on the upper armored deck. The torpedo bulges added at the same time were 13.5 meters (44 ft 3 in) high and 2.84 meters (9 ft 4 in) deep. They were divided into four compartments, the lower two of which were filled with oil and the others remained empty. These additions increased the weight of each ship's armor to 13,032 metric tons (12,826 long tons), 32.6 percent of their displacement. In early 1941, as a preparation for war, the uppermost compartment of the bulges was filled with sealed steel crushing tubes and the barbette armor of both ships was reinforced with 100 mm armor plates above the main deck and 215 mm (8.5 in) plates below it.

=== Fire control and sensors ===
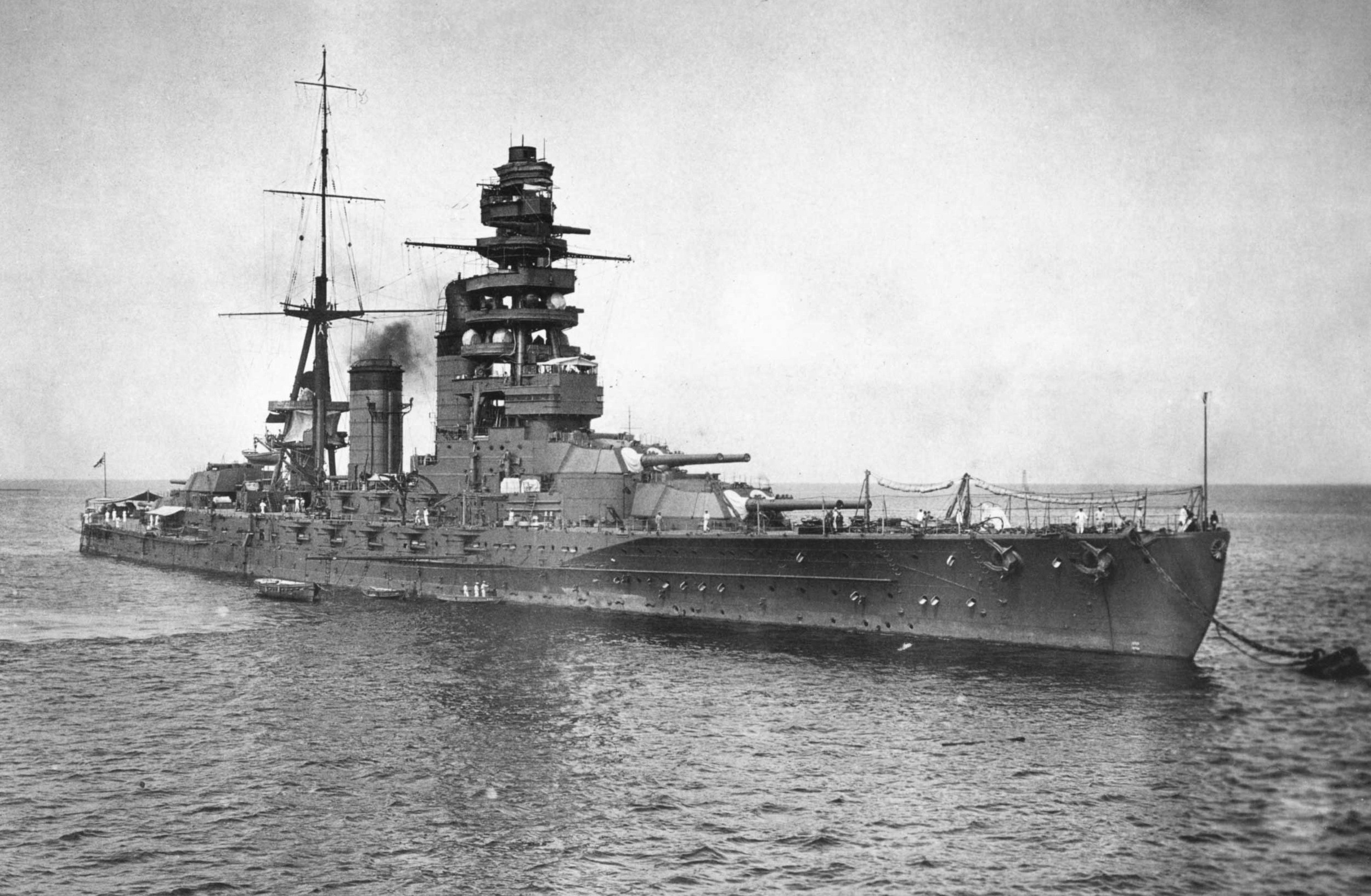
Nagato at anchor, around 1924

The Nagato-class ships were fitted with a 10-meter (32 ft 10 in) rangefinder in the forward superstructure; six-meter (19 ft 8 in) and three-meter (9 ft 10 in) anti-aircraft rangefinders were added in the early 1920s. The rangefinders in the two superfiring turrets were replaced by 10-meter units in 1932–33.

They were initially fitted with a Type 13 fire-control system derived from Vickers equipment received during World War I, but this was replaced by an improved Type 14 system around 1925. It controlled the main and secondary guns; no provision was made for anti-aircraft fire until the Type 31 fire-control director was introduced in 1932. A modified Type 14 fire-control system was tested aboard Nagato in 1935, and later approved for service as the Type 34. A new anti-aircraft director, designated the Type 94, used to control the 127 mm AA guns, was introduced in 1937, although it is unknown when they were installed on the ships. The 25 mm AA guns were controlled by a Type 95 director that was also introduced in 1937.

As far as is known, no radars were installed aboard Mutsu before her loss. While in drydock in May 1943, a Type 21 air-search radar was installed aboard Nagato on the roof of the 10-meter rangefinder at the top of the pagoda mast. On 27 June 1944, two Type 22 surface-search radars were installed on the pagoda mast and two Type 13 early warning radars were fitted on her mainmast.

=== Aircraft ===
Nagato was briefly fitted with an 18-meter (59 ft 1 in) aircraft flying-off platform on No. 2 turret in August 1925. Yokosuka Ro-go Ko-gata and Heinkel HD 25 floatplanes were tested from it before it was removed early the following year. An additional boom was added to the mainmasts of both ships in 1926 to handle the Yokosuka E1Y then assigned to them. A Hansa-Brandenburg W.33 floatplane was tested aboard Nagato that same year. A catapult was fitted between the mainmast and No. 3 turret in mid-1933, a collapsible crane was installed in a portside sponson, and the ships were equipped to operate two or three floatplanes, although no hangar was provided. The sisters began to operate Nakajima E4N2 biplanes until they were replaced by Nakajima E8N2 biplanes in 1938. A more powerful catapult was installed in November 1938 to handle heavier aircraft like the one Kawanishi E7K that was added in 1939–40. Mitsubishi F1M biplanes replaced the E8Ns on 11 February 1943.

== Ships ==
Construction data
Name	Kanji	Builder	Laid down	Launched	Completed	Fate
Nagato	長門	Kure Naval Arsenal	28 August 1917	9 November 1919	25 November 1920	Sunk during Operation Crossroads, 29/30 July 1946
Mutsu	陸奥	Yokosuka Naval Arsenal	1 June 1918	31 May 1920	24 October 1921	Sunk by internal explosion, 8 June 1943

== Construction and service ==
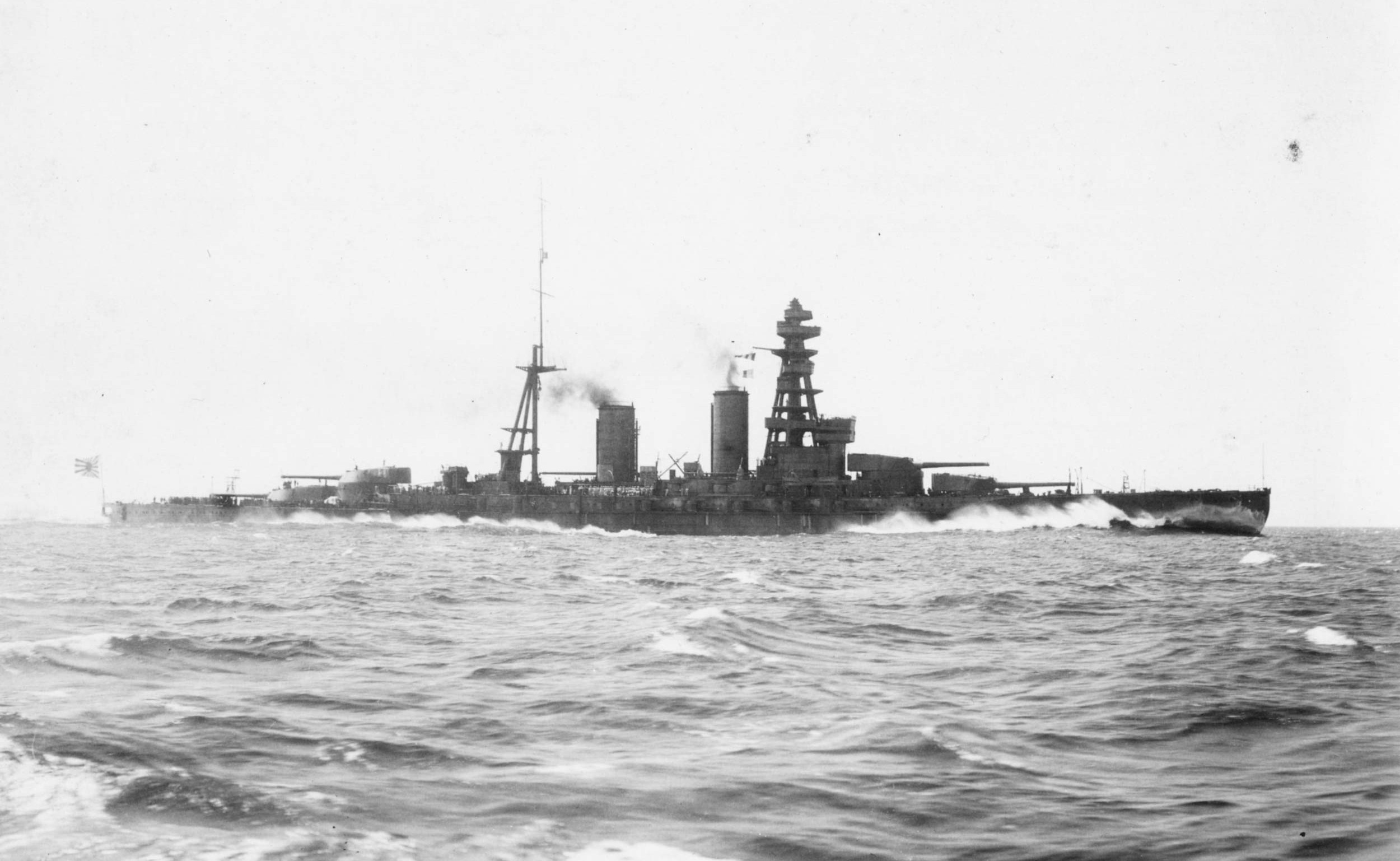
Mutsu at sea, 19 October 1921

While Mutsu was still fitting out, the American government decided to call a conference in Washington, D.C. to forestall the massively expensive naval arms race between the United States, the United Kingdom and the Empire of Japan that was developing. The Washington Naval Conference convened on 12 November, and the Americans proposed to scrap virtually every capital ship under construction or fitting out among the participating nations. Mutsu was specifically listed among those to be scrapped even though she had been commissioned a few weeks earlier. This was unacceptable to the Japanese delegation and they agreed to a compromise that allowed them to keep Mutsu in exchange for scrapping the obsolete dreadnought Settsu and a similar arrangement for several American Colorado-class dreadnoughts that were fitting out.

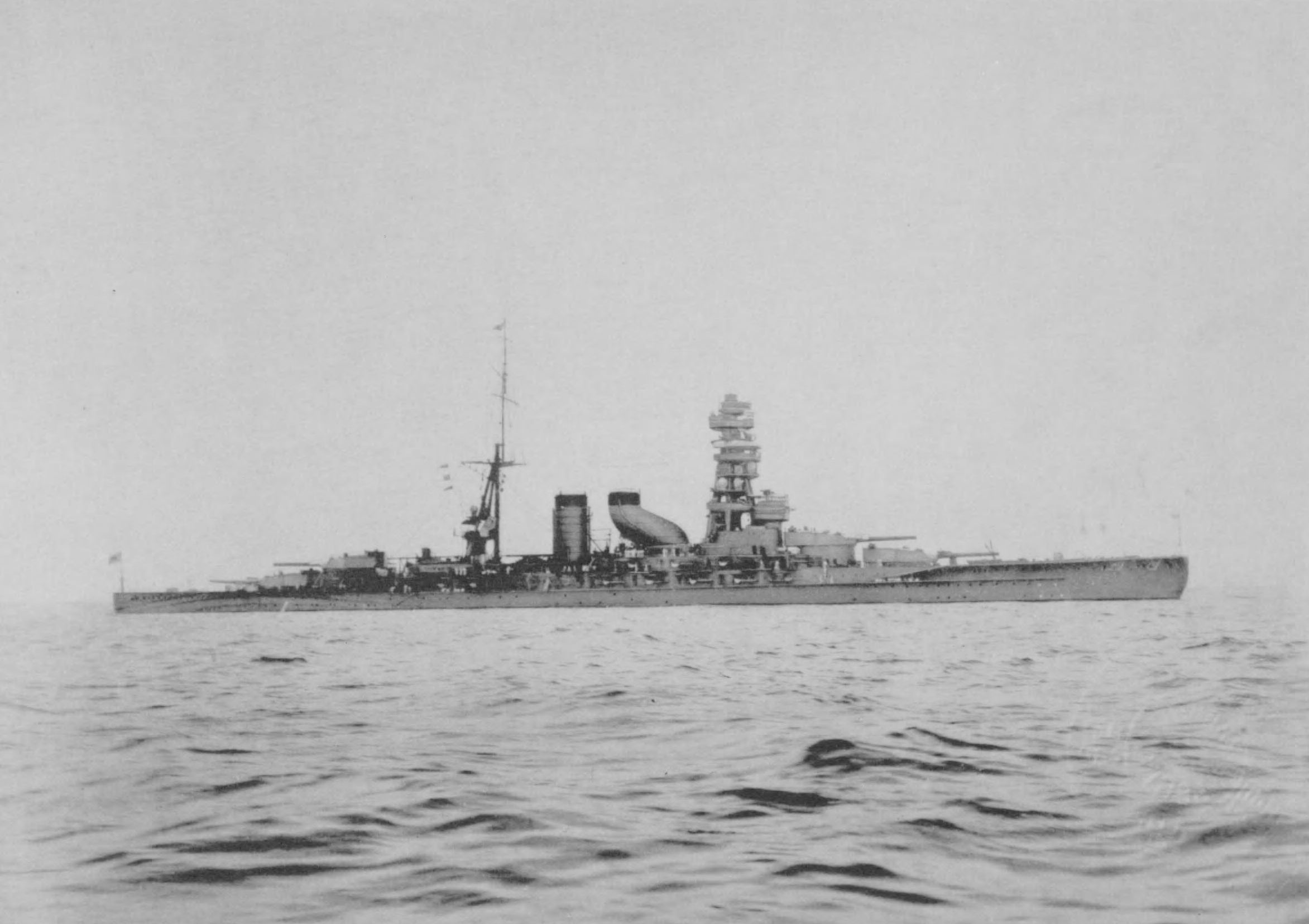
Nagato in the mid-1920s

Upon commissioning, the sister ships were assigned to the 1st Battleship Division, although Nagato became the flagship of Rear Admiral Sōjirō Tochinai, a role she often fulfilled during her career. The ships hosted Edward, Prince of Wales, and his aide-de-camp Lieutenant Louis Mountbatten in 1922 during the prince's visit to Japan. After the 1923 Great Kantō earthquake, both ships loaded supplies from Kyushu for the victims on 4 September. They sank the hulk of the obsolete battleship Satsuma on 7 September 1924 during gunnery practice in Tokyo Bay in accordance with the Washington Naval Treaty. Nagato became flagship of the Combined Fleet on 1 December 1925, flying the flag of Admiral Keisuke Okada. The sisters were placed in reserve several times during the 1920s while they were being modernized. Mutsu served as flagship of Emperor Hirohito during the 1927 naval maneuvers and fleet review and again in 1933.

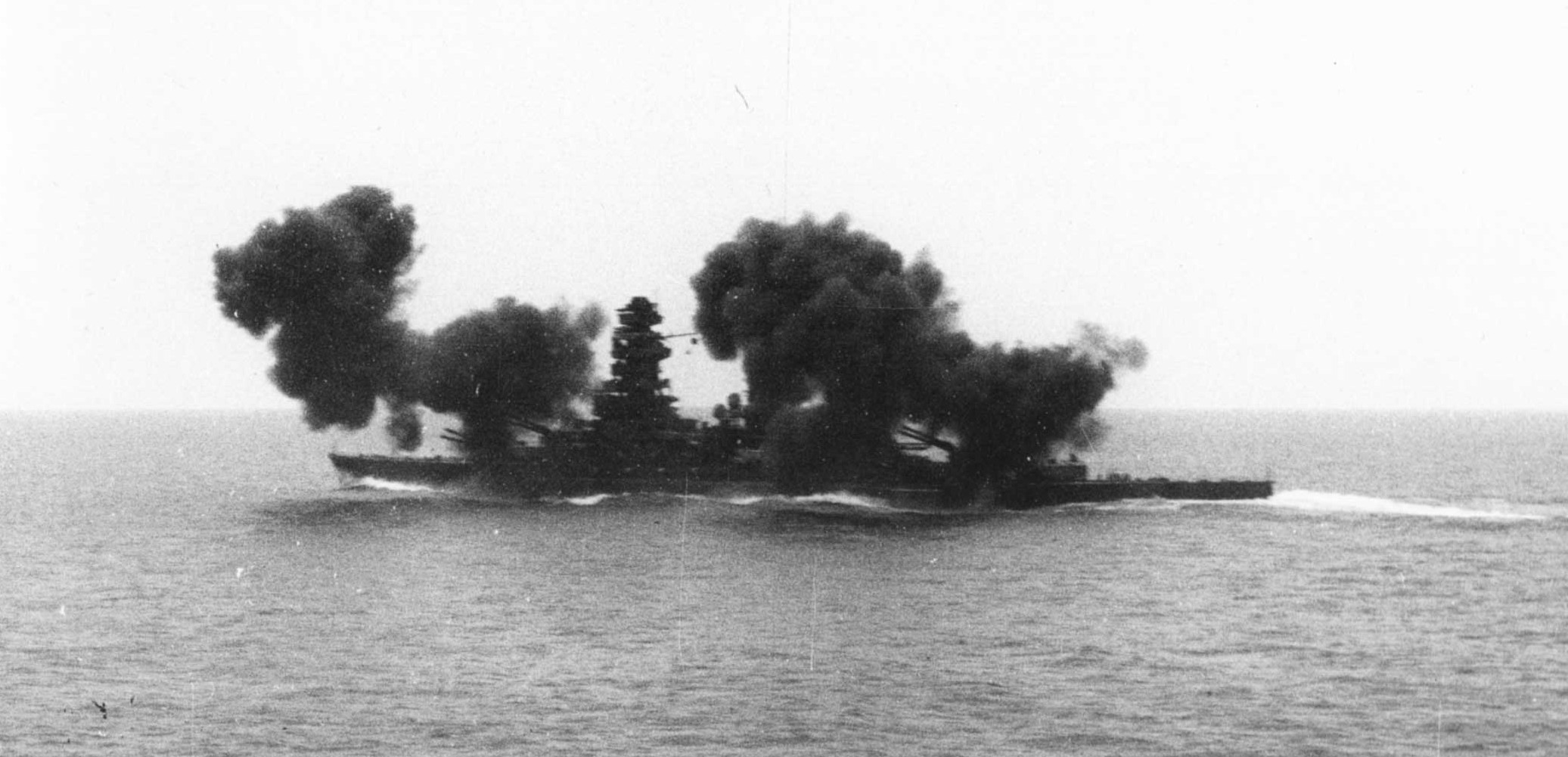
Nagato firing her main armament, 21 May 1936

The ships were reconstructed from late 1933 to mid-1936. In August 1937, the sisters transported 3,749 men of the 11th Infantry Division to Shanghai during the Second Sino-Japanese War. Their floatplanes bombed targets in Shanghai on 24 August before they returned to Sasebo the following day. Nagato became a training ship on 1 December 1937 until she again became the flagship of the Combined Fleet on 15 December 1938. The ship participated in an Imperial Fleet Review on 11 October 1940. The sisters were refitted in 1941 in preparation for war, which included the fitting of external degaussing coils and additional armor for their barbettes.

=== World War II ===
Admiral Isoroku Yamamoto issued the code phrase "Niitaka yama nobore" (Climb Mount Niitaka) on 2 December 1941 from Nagato at anchor at Hashirajima to signal the 1st Air Fleet (Kido Butai) to proceed with its attack on Pearl Harbor. When Japan began the Pacific War on 8 December, (Note: Japan Standard Time is 19 hours ahead of Hawaiian Standard Time, so in Japan, the attack on Pearl Harbor happened on 8 December.) the sisters sortied for the Bonin Islands, along with the four ships of Battleship Division 2 and the light carrier Hōshō as distant cover for the fleet attacking Pearl Harbor, and returned six days later. Yamamoto transferred his flag to the new battleship Yamato on 12 February 1942.

In June 1942, Mutsu and Nagato were assigned to the Main Body of the 1st Fleet during the Battle of Midway, together with Yamato, Hōshō, the light cruiser Sendai and nine destroyers. Following the loss of all four fleet carriers of the "Kido Butai" on 4 June, Yamamoto attempted to lure the American forces west to within range of the Japanese air groups at Wake Island, and into a night engagement with his surface forces, but the American forces withdrew and Mutsu saw no action. After rendezvousing with the remnants of the Striking Force on 6 June, over half of the survivors from the sunken aircraft carriers of the 1st Air Fleet were transferred to Mutsu and Nagato. They arrived at Hashirajima on 14 June.

On 14 July, both ships were reassigned to Battleship Division 2 and Nagato became the flagship of the 1st Fleet. She remained in Japanese waters training until August 1942. Mutsu was transferred to the Advance Force of the 2nd Fleet on 9 August, and departed Yokosuka two days later to support operations during the Guadalcanal Campaign. She arrived at Truk on 17 August. On 20 August, while sailing from Truk to rendezvous with the main body of Vice Admiral Chūichi Nagumo's 3rd Fleet, Mutsu, the heavy cruiser Atago, and escorting destroyers unsuccessfully attempted to locate the escort carrier USS Long Island in response to a flying boat detection of the American ship.

During the Battle of the Eastern Solomons on 27 August, Mutsu, assigned to the Support Force, fired four shells at enemy reconnaissance aircraft during what was her first, and only, action of the war. On 7 January 1943, Mutsu returned to Japan together with the carrier Zuikaku, the heavy cruiser Suzuya and four destroyers. The ship prepared to sortie on 13 April to reinforce the Japanese garrisons in the Aleutian Islands in response to the Battle of the Komandorski Islands, but the operation was cancelled the next day and Mutsu resumed training.

==== Mutsu's loss ====
On 8 June 1943, Mutsu was moored at Hashirajima when the magazine of her No. 3 turret exploded at 12:13, cutting the ship in half. The forward section capsized almost immediately, but the rear section remained afloat until the early morning of the next day. Nearby ships were able to rescue 353 survivors from the 1,474 crew members and visitors aboard Mutsu, meaning that 1,121 men were killed in the explosion. To avert the potential damage to morale from the loss of a battleship, Mutsu's loss was declared a state secret. To further prevent rumors from spreading, many survivors were reassigned to various garrisons in the Pacific Ocean.

The IJN convened a commission three days after the sinking to investigate the loss. It issued its preliminary conclusions on 25 June, well before the investigation of the wreck was completed, and decided that the explosion was the result of a disgruntled seaman. The commission failed to consider the possibility of fire, which historian Mike Williams considers to be a possible cause, as a number of observers noted smoke coming from the vicinity of No. 3 turret. The truth, however, will never be known.

==== Nagato ====
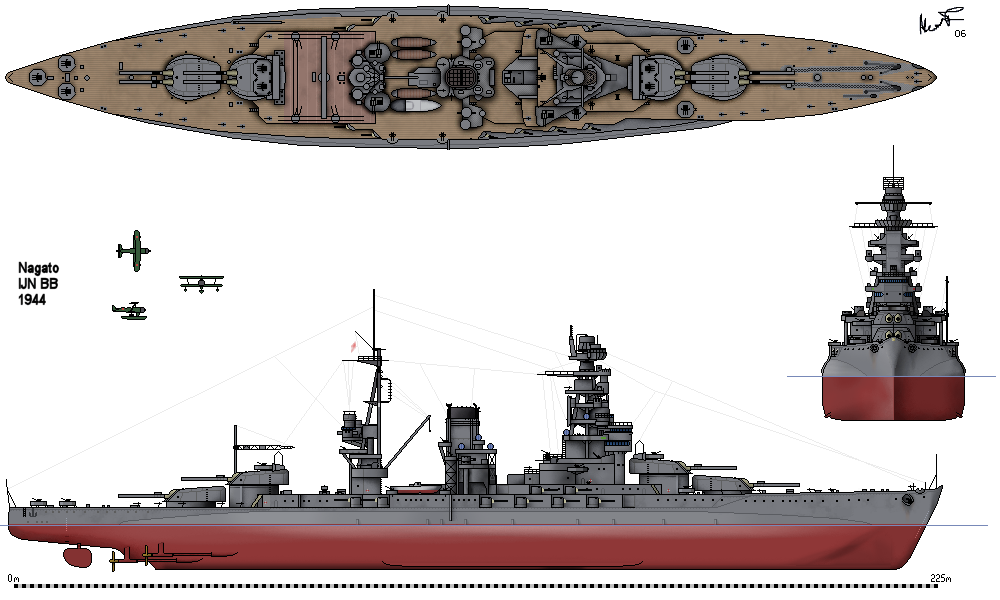
Drawing of Nagato as she appeared in 1944

Nagato transferred to Truk in the Caroline Islands in August 1943. Together with the bulk of the 1st Fleet, she sortied in September and October in unsuccessful searches for American carriers. On 1 February 1944, Nagato departed Truk to avoid an American air raid, and arrived at Palau three days later. The ship arrived on 21 February at Lingga Island, near Singapore, and she became the flagship of Vice Admiral Matome Ugaki, commander of Battleship Division 1, on 25 February until he transferred his flag to Yamato on 5 May. Nagato remained at Lingga until 11 May when she was transferred to Tawitawi on 12 May, and assigned to the 1st Mobile Fleet, under the command of Vice Admiral Jisaburō Ozawa.

Battleship Division 1 rendezvoused with Ozawa's main force on 16 June near the Mariana Islands, and Nagato escorted three aircraft carriers during the Battle of the Philippine Sea. She was only lightly engaged during the battle, was not damaged, and suffered no casualties. After the battle, the ship returned to Japan where she was refitted with additional radars and light AA guns. Nagato loaded a regiment of the 28th Infantry Division and delivered them at Okinawa on 11 July before continuing on to Lingga.

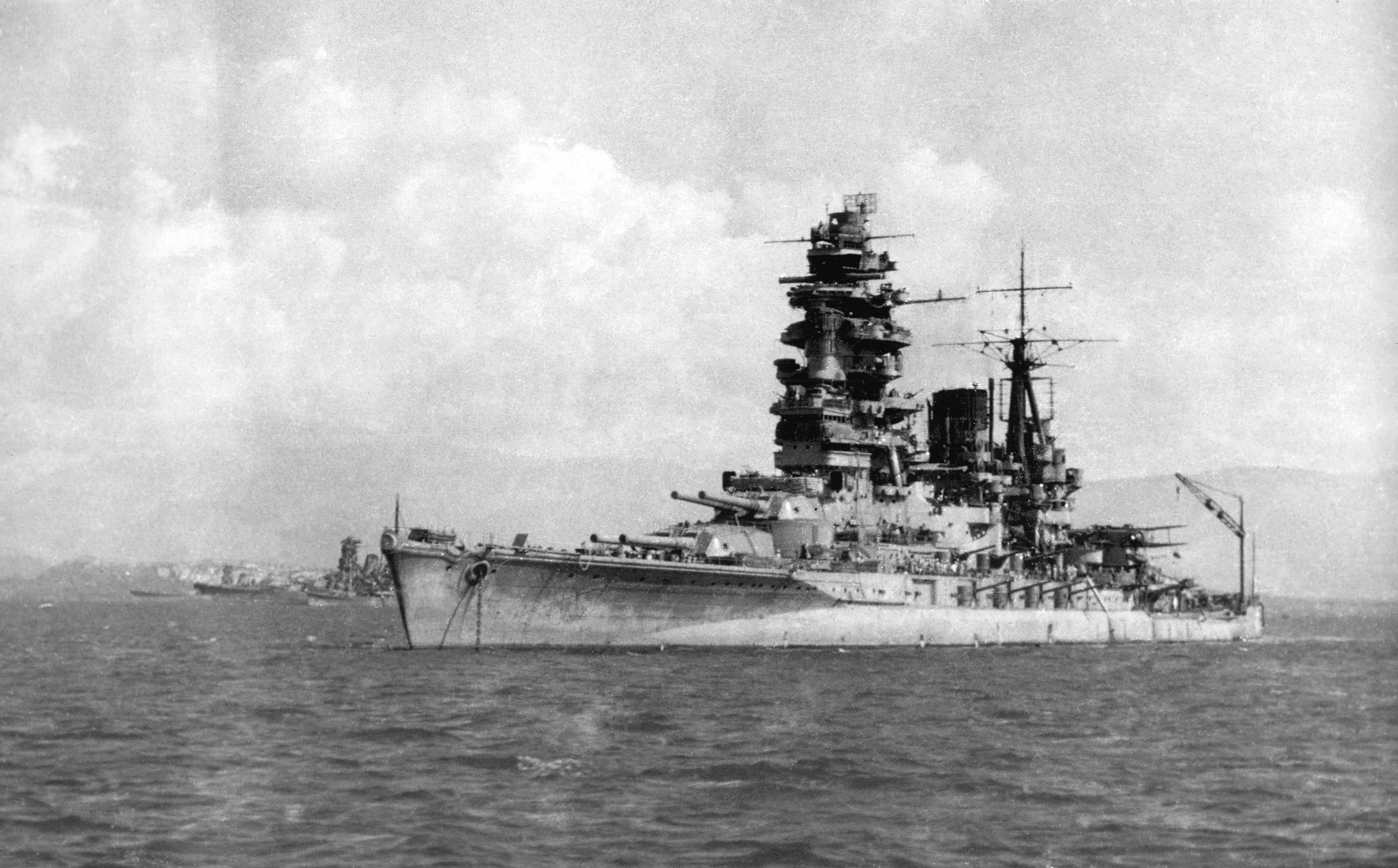
Nagato lies at anchor in Brunei Bay, 21 October 1944, shortly before the Battle of Leyte Gulf

In October 1944, the ship took part in "Operation Sho-1", an attack on the Allied landings on Leyte. Assigned to Vice Admiral Takeo Kurita's 1st Diversion Force (also known as the Center Force), Nagato was attacked by multiple waves of American dive bombers and fighters during the Battle of the Sibuyan Sea on 24 October en route to Leyte Gulf. She was struck twice by bombs that killed 52 crewmen, but was not seriously damaged.

The next morning, the 1st Diversion Force attacked the American forces supporting the invasion in the Battle off Samar. Nagato engaged the escort carriers and destroyers of Task Group 77.4.3, codenamed "Taffy 3". She opened fire on three escort carriers, the first time she had fired her guns at an enemy ship, but missed. One of the defending destroyers fired a spread of torpedoes that missed their intended target and headed for Yamato and Nagato which were on a parallel course. The two battleships were forced to turn away north to avoid the torpedoes, and were 10 miles (16 km) away from the engagement before the torpedoes ran out of fuel. Turning back, Nagato engaged the American ships, claiming damage to one cruiser. (Note: No cruisers were present, only destroyers and destroyer escorts.) Later in the day, Nagato was hit in the bow by two bombs, but the damage was not severe.

The ship returned to Japan for repairs in mid-November. Lack of fuel and materials meant that she could not be brought back into service and she was turned into a floating anti-aircraft battery. Her funnel and mainmast were removed to improve the arcs of fire of her AA guns, which were increased by two Type 89 mounts and nine triple 25 mm gun mounts. Her forward secondary guns were removed in compensation. A coal-burning donkey boiler was installed on the pier for heating and cooking purposes and a converted submarine chaser was moored alongside to provide steam and electricity; her anti-aircraft guns lacked full power and were only partially operational. On 20 April Nagato was reduced to reserve. In June 1945, all of her secondary guns and about half of her anti-aircraft armament was moved ashore, together with her rangefinders and searchlights. Her crew was therefore reduced to less than 1,000 officers and enlisted men. On 18 July 1945, the heavily camouflaged ship was attacked by carrier-based fighter bombers and torpedo bombers. Nagato was hit by two bombs and a rocket that killed 35 men and damaged four 25 mm guns. On 30 August, a few days before the formal surrender, American sailors took control of the ship.

== After the war ==
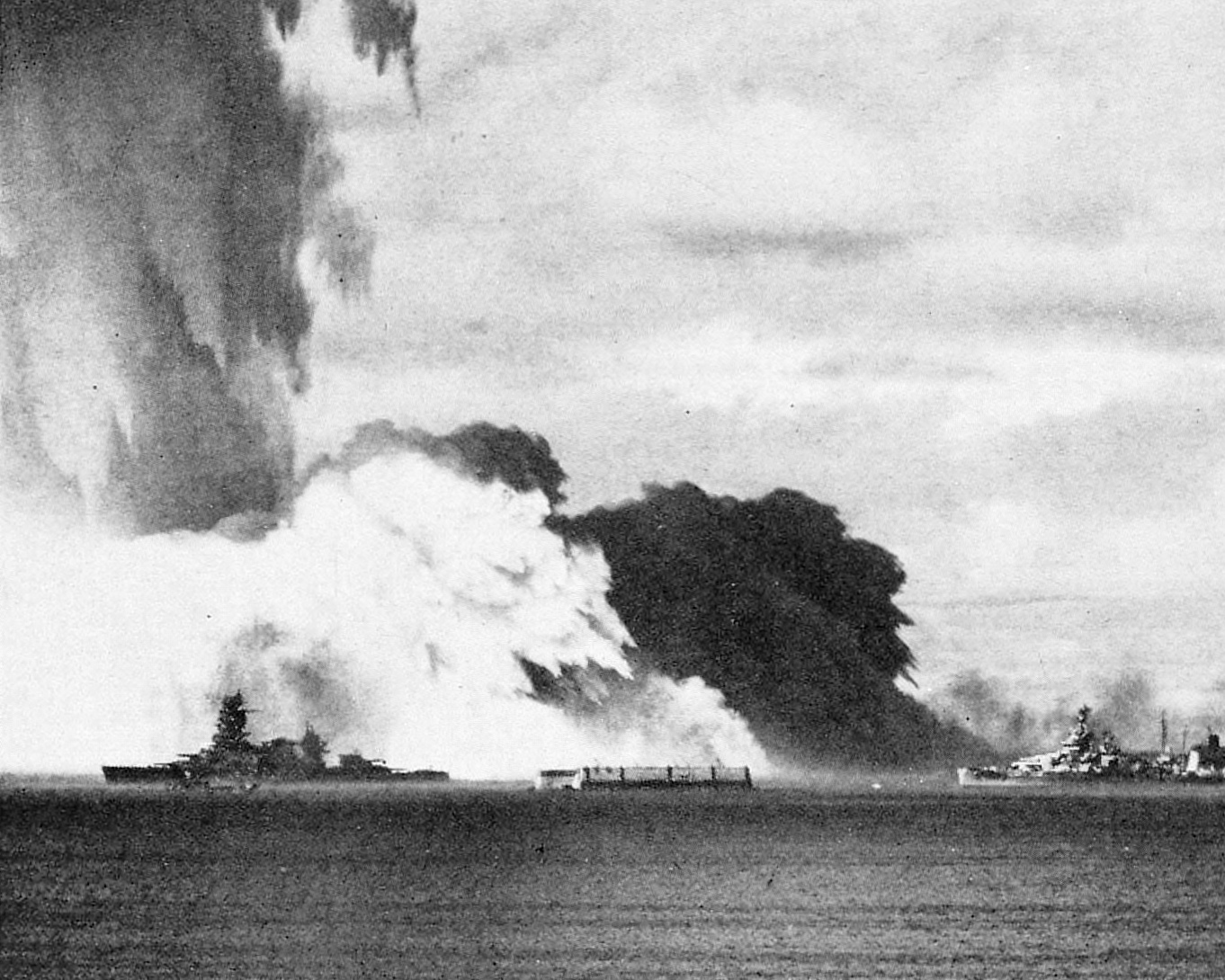
Nagato, left, at the beginning of the blast surge during the second atomic bomb test at Bikini Atoll

Nagato was selected to participate as a target ship in Operation Crossroads, a series of U.S. nuclear weapon tests held at Bikini Atoll in mid-1946. In mid-March, Nagato departed Yokosuka for Eniwetok, but her hull had not been repaired from the underwater damage sustained during the attack on 18 July and she leaked enough that her pumps could not keep up. The ship had a list of seven degrees to port by the time tugboats from Eniwetok arrived. She reached the atoll on 4 April and Bikini in May.

Operation Crossroads began with the first blast (Test Able), an air burst on 1 July 1946; Nagato was not close to ground zero and was only lightly damaged. For Test Baker, an underwater explosion, the ship was positioned closer to ground zero. Nagato rode out the tsunami of water from the explosion with little apparent damage; she had a slight starboard list of two degrees after the tsunami dissipated. A more thorough assessment could not be made because she was dangerously radioactive. Her list gradually increased over the next five days and she capsized during the night of 29/30 July. Opened to divers in 1996, Nagato was named by The Times as one of the top 10 wreck diving sites in the world.

Mutsu's wreck in Japan was treated differently. In 1970, salvage operations began that lasted until 1978 and recovered about 75% of the ship. The salvagers recovered bodies of 849 crewmen killed during the explosion. In 1995, the Mutsu Memorial Museum declared that no further salvage operations were planned. The only significant portion of the ship that remains is a 35-meter (114 ft 10 in) long section running from the bridge structure forward to the vicinity of No. 1 turret. The highest portion of the ship is 12 meters (39 ft 4 in) below the surface. Many, but not all, artifacts are displayed at the Mutsu Memorial Museum in Tōwa-Cho. Since 1963, a memorial service has been held there every year on 8 June in honor of the crew.
